= Logistic Regiment "Taurinense" =

Active Italian Army brigade logistics unit

- Reggimento Logistico "Taurinense"
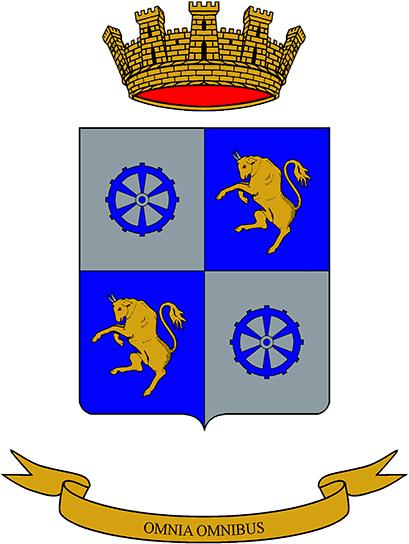
- Regimental coat of arms
- Active: 1 Oct. 1990 – today
- Country: Italy
- Branch: Italian Army
- Role: Military logistics
- Part of: Alpine Brigade "Taurinense"
- Garrison/HQ: Rivoli
- Motto: "Omnia omnibus"
- Anniversaries: 22 May 1916 – Battle of Asiago
- Decorations: 1× Silver Cross of Army Merit

Insignia
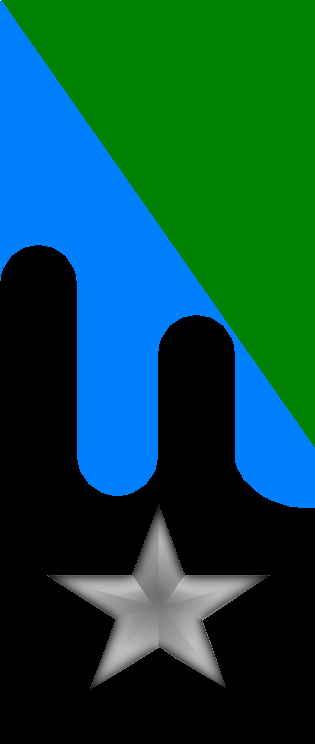
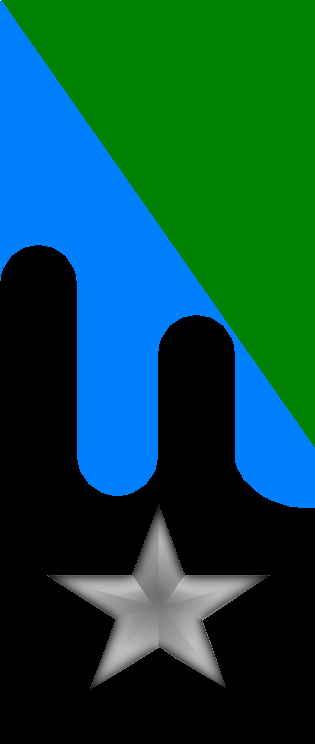
- Unit gorget patches

The Logistic Regiment "Taurinense" (Italian: Reggimento Logistico "Taurinense") is a military logistics regiment of the Italian Army based in Rivoli in Piedmont. Originally a transport unit, the regiment is now the logistic unit of the Alpine Brigade "Taurinense" and shares with the brigade's infantry troops, the Alpini, the distinctive Cappello Alpino. The regiment's anniversary falls, as for all units of the Italian Army's Transport and Materiel Corps, on 22 May, the anniversary of the Royal Italian Army's first major use of automobiles to transport reinforcements to the Asiago plateau to counter the Austro-Hungarian Asiago Offensive in May 1916.

== History ==
=== Interwar years ===
In August 1920, the I Automobilistic Center was formed in Turin and assigned to the I Army Corps. In 1923, the center was disbanded and its personnel and materiel used to form the I Auto Grouping, which consisted of a command, an auto group, a railway group, and a depot. On 1 October 1926, the grouping was disbanded and the next day its personnel and vehicles were used to form the 1st Automobilistic Center. The center consisted of a command, the I Automobilistic Group, and a depot. The three companies of the disbanded railway group were assigned to the 5th Field Artillery Regiment, 11th Field Artillery Regiment, and 28th Field Artillery Regiment. On 1 January 1927, one of the auto companies of the I Automobilistic Group was transferred from Turin to Alessandria to help form the 2nd Automobilistic Center there.

In 1935–36, the center mobilized the command and the workshop of the 65th Auto Group, as well as six auto units for the Second Italo-Ethiopian War. In 1937, the center added a School Group to its organization.

=== World War II ===
On 1 July 1942, the 1st Automobilistic Center was renamed 1st Drivers Regiment. In the evening of 8 September 1943, the Armistice of Cassibile, which ended hostilities between the Kingdom of Italy and the Anglo-American Allies, was announced by General Dwight D. Eisenhower on Radio Algiers and by Marshal Pietro Badoglio on Italian radio. Germany reacted by invading Italy and the 1st Drivers Regiment was disbanded soon thereafter by German forces. During World War II the center mobilized in its depot in Turin among others the following units:

- 1st Auto Grouping Command
- 1st Heavy Auto Group
- 1st Mixed Auto Group
- 1st Autobus Auto Group
- 51st Heavy Auto Group
- 51st Mixed Auto Group
- 62nd Heavy Auto Group
- 1st Roadside Assistance Unit
- 11th Auto Workshop
- 49th Heavy Mobile Workshop
- 52nd Heavy Mobile Workshop
- 1st Army Auto Park
- 6th Army Auto Park
- 8th Army Auto Park

=== Cold War ===
On 15 February 1947, the 1st Drivers Center was formed in Turin, which consisted of a command, the 1st Auto Unit, the 1st Vehicles Park, a fuel depot, and a depot. The center supported the I Territorial Military Command of the Northwestern Military Region. On 1 March 1949, the 8th Vehicles Park was transferred to the 8th Automotive Repair Shop. In 1957, the 2nd Drivers Center in Genoa and the 3rd Drivers Center in Milan were disbanded and the 1st Drivers Center became responsible for the entire Northwestern Military Region. The center was tasked with the transport of fuel, ammunition, and materiel between the military region's depots and the logistic supply points of the army's divisions and brigades. On 31 December 1964, the 1st Drivers Center was disbanded. The next day the 1st Auto Unit became an autonomous unit and was assigned to the I Territorial Military Command.

As part of the 1975 army reform the unit was renamed 1st Mixed Maneuver Auto Unit.

=== Recent times ===
On 1 October 1990, the 1st Mixed Maneuver Auto Unit was reorganized as 1st Transport Battalion "Monviso". Transport battalions formed after the 1986 army reform were named after a landmark mountain in the military region's area of operations; in case of the 1st Transport Battalion for the highest mountain of the Cottian Alps the Monviso. On 28 March 1991, the President of the Italian Republic Francesco Cossiga granted the battalion a new flag and assigned the traditions of the 1st Drivers Regiment to the battalion. At the time the battalion consisted of a command, a command and services company, a mixed transport company, and a special transports company.

On 28 March 1991, the President of the Italian Republic Francesco Cossiga granted the battalion a flag and assigned the battalion the traditions of the 1st Drivers Regiment.

On 5 November 1996, the 1st Transport Battalion "Monviso" and the Logistic Battalion "Cremona" in Venaria Reale were disbanded. The next day the personnel and materiel of the two battalions were used to form the 1st Military Region Logistic Unit "Monviso" in Venaria Reale. The new unit consisted of a command, a command and services company, a transport battalion, and a movement control and convoy escort company. The unit's transport battalion fielded a mixed transport company, a special transport company, and a maintenance company. On 1 July 1998, the unit was renamed 1st Logistic Support Regiment "Monviso".

On 1 February 2001, the regiment absorbed part of the personnel of the disbanded Logistic Battalion "Taurinense" and the Airmobile Medical Unit "Taurinense" of the Alpine Brigade "Taurinense". On the same date, the regiment was assigned to the Logistic Projection Brigade. The regiment consisted now of a command, a command and logistic support company, a supply battalion, a medical battalion, and two maintenance companies.

On 1 April 2001, the regiment was renamed 1st Maneuver Regiment. The two maintenance companies were later merged into a maintenance battalion and the regiment then consisted of:

- 1st Maneuver Regiment, in Rivoli
  - Command and Logistic Support Company
  - Supply Battalion, in Rivoli
  - Maintenance Battalion, in Rivoli
  - Medical Battalion, in Turin

On 1 March 2013, the regiment was transferred to the Alpine Brigade "Taurinense". On 1 January 2015, the regiment was renamed Logistic Regiment "Taurinense" and reorganized as a brigade logistic regiment. For its conduct and work during the COVID-19 pandemic the regiment was awarded in 2022 a Silver Cross of Army Merit, which was affixed to the regiment's flag.

== Organization ==
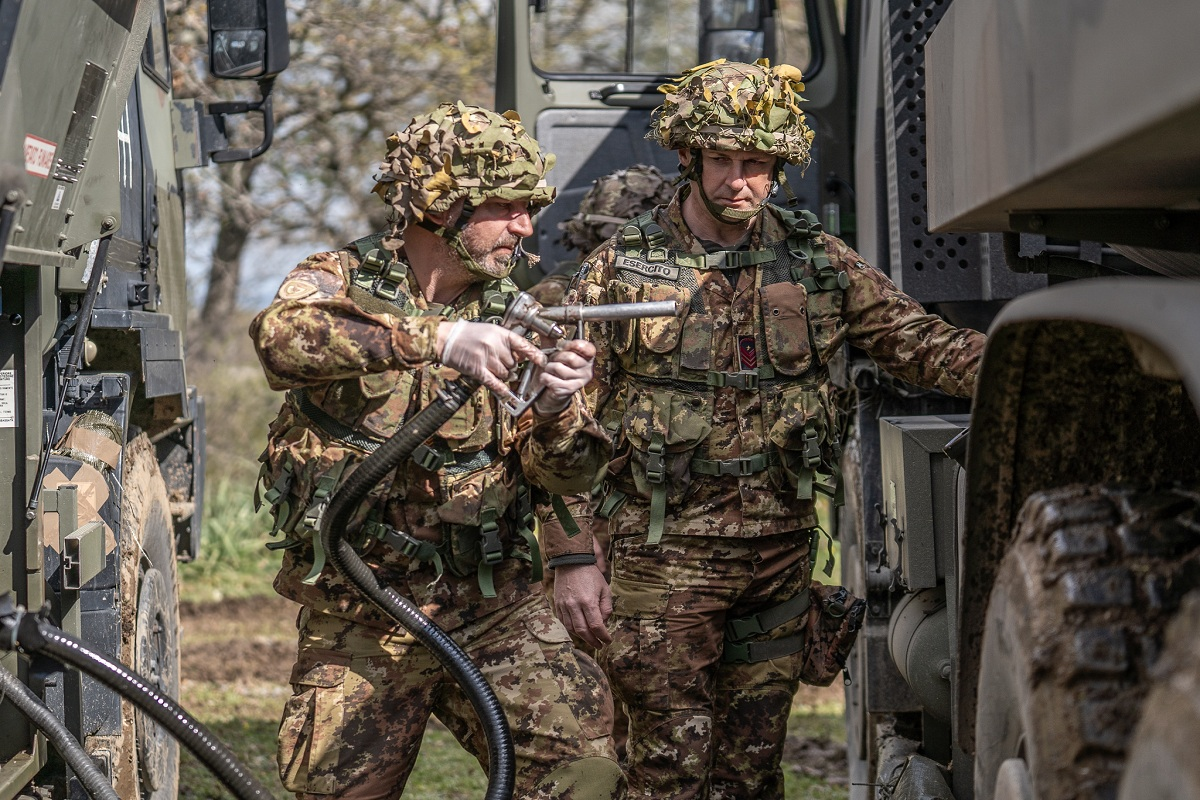
Logistic Regiment "Taurinense" troops during the "Monte Romano 1–25" exercise 2025

As of 2024 the Logistic Regiment "Taurinense" is organized as follows:

- Logistic Regiment "Taurinense", in Rivoli
  - Command and Logistic Support Company
  - Logistic Battalion
    - Transport Company
    - Maintenance Company
    - Supply Company

== See also ==
- Military logistics
