= Alpine Brigade "Taurinense" =

- Brigata Alpina "Taurinense"
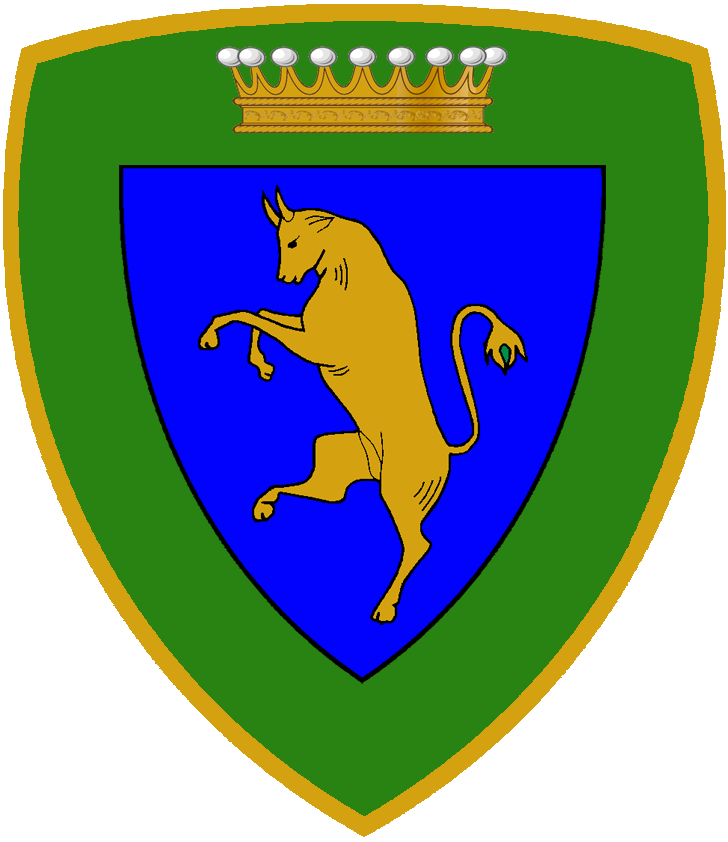
- Coat of Arms of the Alpine Brigade "Taurinense"
- Active: 15 April 1952 – today
- Country: Italy
- Branch: Italian Army
- Role: Alpini
- Size: Brigade
- Part of: Alpine Troops Command
- Garrison/HQ: Turin
- Colors: green
- Engagements: Iraq Operation Provide Comfort; Bosnia SFOR; Mozambique ONUMOZ; Kosovo KFOR; Afghanistan ISAF

Commanders
- Current commander: Brigadier Federico Bonato

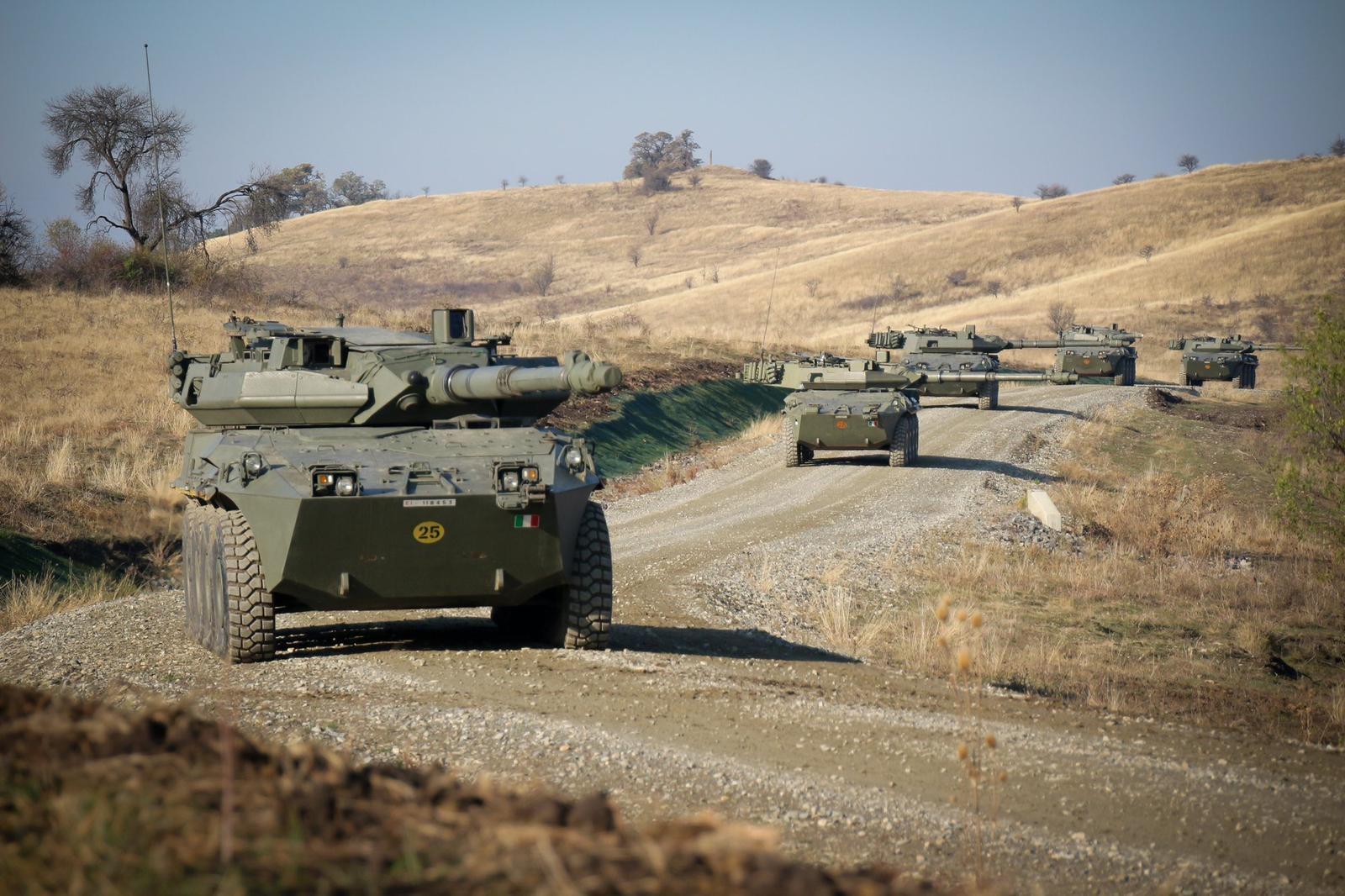
A Regiment "Nizza Cavalleria" (1st) Centauro column on exercise in Cincu, Romania 2019

The Alpine Brigade "Taurinense" is a light Infantry brigade of the Italian Army, specializing in Mountain Combat. Its core units are Alpini, the mountain infantry corps of the Italian Army, that distinguished itself in combat during World War I and World War II. The brigade's name "Taurinense" alludes to the Roman name Augusta Taurinorum for the city of Turin around which the brigade is based. Accordingly the brigade's coat of arms is modeled after Turin's coat of arms. The brigade carries on the name and traditions of the 1st Alpine Division "Taurinense".

== History ==
=== Constitution ===
The Taurinense was constituted on 15 April 1952 in the city of Turin. Initially the brigade was part of the III Army Corps and consisted of the following units:

- Alpine Brigade "Taurinense", in Turin
  - Headquarters and Headquarters Platoon, in Turin
  - 4th Alpini Regiment, in Turin
    - Headquarters Platoon
    - Alpini Battalion "Aosta", in Aosta
    - Alpini Battalion "Saluzzo", in Borgo San Dalmazzo
    - Alpini Battalion "Susa", in Pinerolo
    - 4th Mortar Company, in Turin
  - 1st Mountain Artillery Regiment, in Rivoli
    - Command Unit, in Rivoli
    - Mountain Artillery Group "Aosta", in Saluzzo
    - Mountain Artillery Group "Susa", in Susa
    - Mountain Artillery Group "Pinerolo", in Mondovì
    - Light Air-defense Group (disbanded on 1 January 1956)
  - Mixed Engineer Company, in Turin (later split into a Signal Company and an Engineer Company)

In the following years the brigade was augmented with further units:

- Alpini Battalion "Mondovì" (1953) as 4th battalion of the 4th Alpini Regiment
- Alpini Paratroopers Platoon, in Turin (1953)
- Light Aircraft Section "Taurinense", at Turin-Venaria Reale Air Base (1958)

On 26 October 1962 the Alpini Battalion "Mondovì" moved to Paluzza in the Friuli-Venezia Giulia region to augment the Alpine Brigade "Julia", followed by the Mountain Artillery Group "Pinerolo", which moved to Tolmezzo on 1 December 1963 to join the Julia. The same year the Alpini Battalion "Aosta" was transferred to the Alpine Formation and Training Center in Aosta, but returned to the 4th Alpini Regiment in 1967. From 1964 to 1967 the "Saluzzo" was placed into reserve status. The Alpini Paratroopers Platoon merged with the paratrooper platoons of the other four alpine brigades on 1 April 1964 to form the Alpini Paratroopers Company in Bolzano under direct command of the 4th Army Corps. The same year the 4th Mortar Company was disbanded and its mortars and troops divided among the brigade's Alpini battalions. On 1 June 1966 the 2nd Alpini (Recruits Training) Regiment joined the brigade. The regiment's four battalions were named for the four alpine brigades to which the conscripts were sent after training: Tridentina, Orobica, Cadore, and Taurinense. In 1970 the Mountain Artillery Group "Mondovì" was raised and added to the 1st Mountain Artillery Regiment. Thus in 1972 when the brigade was transferred from the III Army Corps to the IV Army Corps it consisted of the following units:

- Alpine Brigade "Taurinense", in Turin
  - Headquarters and Headquarters Company, in Turin
  - 2nd Alpini (Recruits Training) Regiment, in Cuneo
    - Command and Services Company, in Cuneo
    - Alpini Battalion "Cadore", in Boves
    - Alpini Battalion "Orobica", in Cuneo
    - Alpini Battalion "Taurinense", in Bra
    - Alpini Battalion "Tridentina", in Cuneo
  - 4th Alpini Regiment, in Turin
    - Command and Services Company, in Turin
    - Alpini Battalion "Aosta", in Aosta
    - Alpini Battalion "Saluzzo", in Borgo San Dalmazzo
    - Alpini Battalion "Susa", in Pinerolo
  - 1st Mountain Artillery Regiment, in Rivoli
    - Command Battery, in Rivoli
    - Mountain Artillery Group "Aosta", in Saluzzo
    - Mountain Artillery Group "Susa", in Susa
    - Mountain Artillery Group "Mondovì", in Mondovì
  - Services Grouping "Taurinense", in Rivoli
  - Engineer Company "Taurinense", in Turin
  - Signal Company "Taurinense", in Abbadia Alpina
  - Light Aviation Unit "Taurinense", at Turin-Venaria Reale Air Base

=== 1975 Reorganization ===
"Taurinense" locations 1989

With 1975 Italian Army reform the regimental level was abolished and battalions came under direct command of multi-arms brigades. At the same time the army reduced and realigned its forces and therefore the Taurinense saw some changes to its composition: the "Aosta" battalion was once more transferred to the Alpine Formation and Training Center, the Mountain Artillery Group "Susa" was renamed "Pinerolo", while the Mountain Artillery Group "Mondovì" was disbanded. The brigade headquarters and the signal company were merged to form the Command and Signal Unit "Taurinense". An anti-tank company was raised, and the Services Grouping "Taurinense" was reorganized as a logistic battalion. The 2nd Alpini Regiment (Recruits Training) had already been disbanded on 31 October 1974 and with one of its training battalion joining the Taurinense as Alpini Battalion "Mondovì".

After the reform the brigade's two Alpini battalions had an authorized strength of 950 men, while the two artillery groups had an authorized strength of 610 men and fielded 18 M56 105 mm pack howitzers each. The new composition was:

- Alpine Brigade "Taurinense", in Turin
  - Command and Signal Unit "Taurinense", in Turin
  - Alpini Battalion "Mondovì" (Recruits Training), in Cuneo
    - Headquarters and Service Company
    - 9th Alpini (Training) Company
    - 10th Alpini (Training) Company
    - 11th Alpini (Training) Company
    - 103rd Alpini (Training) Company
  - Alpini Battalion "Saluzzo", in Borgo San Dalmazzo
    - Headquarters and Service Company
    - 21st Alpini Company
    - 22nd Alpini Company
    - 23rd Alpini Company
    - 106th Heavy Mortar Company
  - Alpini Battalion "Susa", in Pinerolo
    - Headquarters and Service Company
    - 34th Alpini Company
    - 35th Alpini Company
    - 36th Alpini Company
    - 133rd Heavy Mortar Company
  - Mountain Artillery Group "Aosta", in Saluzzo
    - Headquarters and Service Battery
    - 4th Mountain Artillery Battery
    - 5th Mountain Artillery Battery
    - 6th Mountain Artillery Battery
  - Mountain Artillery Group "Pinerolo", in Susa
    - Headquarters and Service Battery
    - 7th Mountain Artillery Battery
    - 8th Mountain Artillery Battery
    - 40th Mountain Artillery Battery
  - Logistic Battalion "Taurinense", in Rivoli
    - Command and Services Platoon
    - 1st Light Logistic Unit
    - 2nd Light Logistic Unit
    - Medium Logistic Unit
  - Anti-tank Company "Taurinense", in Turin
  - Engineer Company "Taurinense", in Abbadia Alpina
  - Army Light Aviation Unit, at Turin-Venaria Reale Air Base (renamed 4th Reconnaissance Helicopter Squadron and transferred to the 4th Army Aviation Regiment "Altair" on 31 January 1976)

On 1 June 1978 the Airmobile Medical Unit "Taurinense" was formed by reorganized the 101st Field Hospital as a rapid deployable medical asset. The only such unit in the Italian Army.

==== Strategic plans in case of war ====
After the 1975 reform the 4th Alpine Army Corps was responsible to defend the Italian border along the main chain of the alps from the Swiss-Austrian-Italian border tripoint in the west to the Italian-Yugoslavian border in the east. In case of war with Yugoslavia the 4th Alpine Army Corps would remain static in its position guarding the left flank of the 5th Army Corps, which would meet the enemy forces in the plains of Friuli-Venezia Giulia. The only brigade which would have seen combat in such a case would have been the Julia.

In case of a war with the Warsaw Pact the 4th Alpine Army Corps had two war planes: one in the case the Soviet Southern Group of Forces and Hungarian Army would march through Yugoslavia and the other in case the Warsaw Pact would violate the Austrian neutrality and march through Austria. In case the enemy forces would come through Yugoslavia, the Julia would cover the mountainous left flank of the 5th Army Corps, which with its four armoured and five mechanized brigades would try to wear down the enemy before it could break out into the North Italian Padan plain. The other alpine brigades would remain static.

In the more likely case the Soviet and Hungarian divisions would invade Austria and march through Southern Styria and through the Drava valley in Carinthia the alpine brigades would have been the first front line units of the Italian Army. The Julia would have defended the Canal Valley, the Cadore the Piave Valley, the Tridentina the Puster Valley, while the Orobica had a special mission. The Taurinense was to be kept in reserve and deployed as needed: either to reinforce the other alpine brigades; or to block with the Paratroopers Brigade "Folgore" and Motorized Brigade "Friuli" the Apennine passes into central Italy if enemy forces would have been able to cross the lower Adige and Po rivers; or to block with the French 27th Mountain Infantry Brigade the French-Italian mountain passes in case Warsaw Pact forces would have conquered all of Northern Italy. If the 5th Army Corps with reinforcement from the 3rd Army Corps would have been able to stop Warsaw Pact forces before the Piave river the Taurinense was would have deployed to Norway to support NATO's Allied Command Europe Mobile Force.

=== 1990s reorganization ===
On 23 March 1991 the Mountain Artillery Group "Pinerolo" was disbanded. On 1 August 1992 the "Saluzzo" battalion was integrated in the reactivated 2nd Alpini Regiment. The same month the Anti-tank Company was disbanded. On 19 September 1992 the Mountain Artillery Group "Aosta" entered the reactivated 1st Mountain Artillery Regiment. With the entry of the "Susa" battalion into the reactivated 3rd Alpini Regiment on 23 October 1993 the reorganization of the brigade was for the time complete. Both Alpini regiments consisted of one battalion and a support company. The Command and Signal Unit was merged with the Engineer Company into the Command and Tactical Supports Unit. The new composition was:

- Alpine Brigade "Taurinense", in Turin
  - Command and Tactical Supports Unit "Taurinense", in Turin
  - 2nd Alpini Regiment Alpini Battalion "Saluzzo", in Borgo San Dalmazzo
  - 3rd Alpini Regiment Alpini Battalion "Susa", in Pinerolo
  - 1st Mountain Artillery Regiment Mountain Artillery Group "Aosta", in Saluzzo
  - Alpini (Recruits Training) Battalion "Mondovì", in Cuneo
  - Logistic Battalion "Taurinense", in Rivoli

When the Alpine Brigade "Cadore" was disbanded in 1997, the two remaining regiments of that brigade passed to the Alpine Brigade "Julia", which in turn ceded the 9th Alpini Regiment to the "Taurinense". At the same time the Alpini (Recruits Training) Battalion "Mondovì" was disbanded. The same year the 2nd Alpini Regiment moved from Borgo San Dalmazzo into the base of the disbanded "Mondovì" in Cuneo. In 2002 the Logistic Battalion "Taurinense" was disbanded. On 1 September 2002 the 2nd Battalion of the Ferrovieri Engineer Regiment was merged with the Engineer Company of the brigade's Command and Tactical Supports Unit to form the 32nd Engineer Battalion, which joined the Taurinense on the same date. In On 24 September 2004 the 32nd Engineer Battalion was expanded to 32nd Engineer Regiment.

== Organization ==
Taurinense units 2022
(The 9th Alpini Regiment is based in L'Aquila in central Italy)

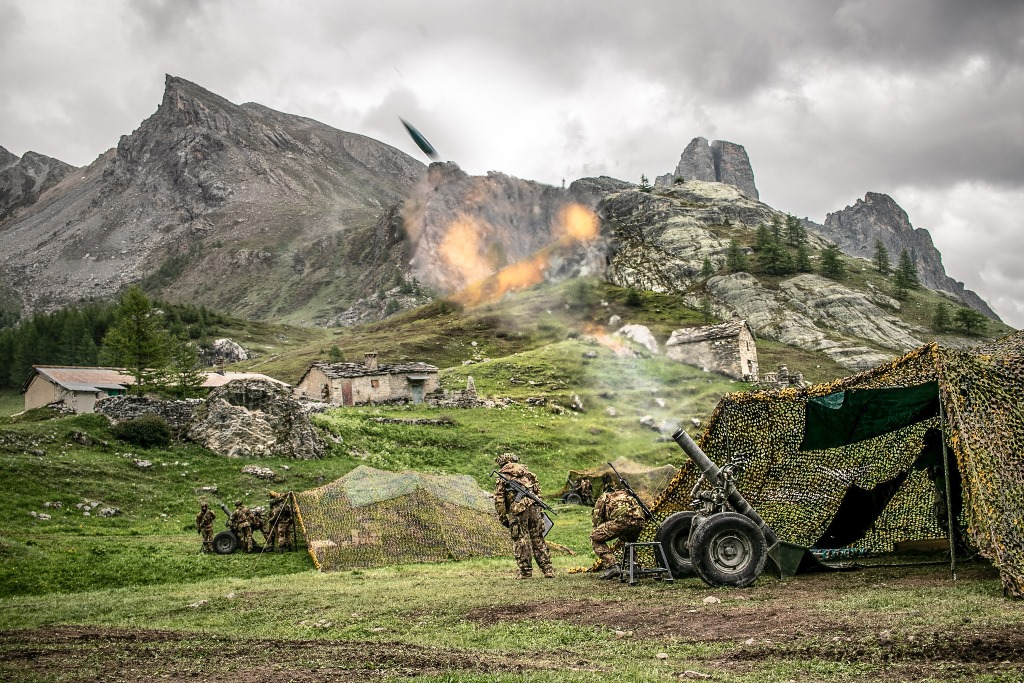
3rd Alpini Regiment mortar platoon

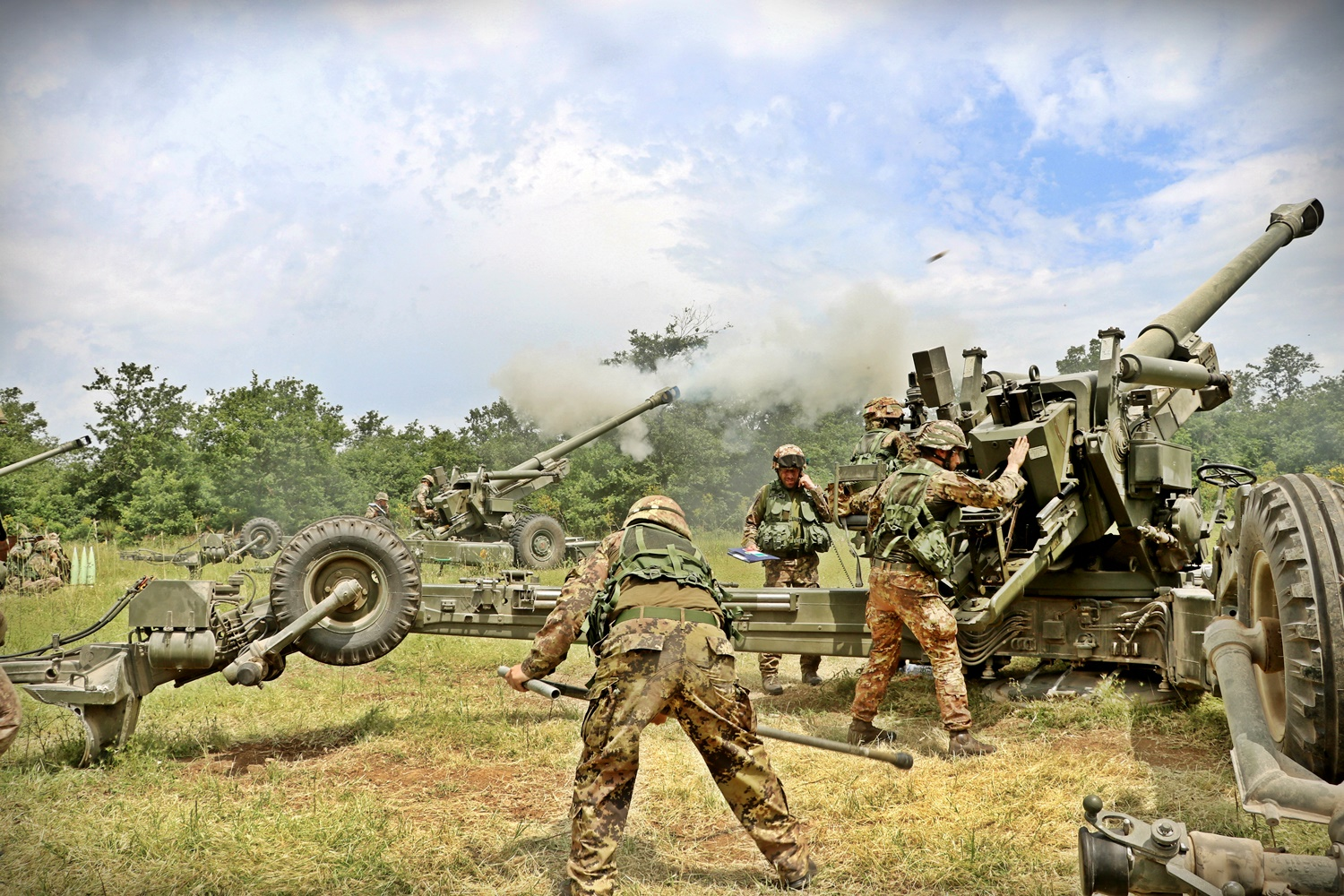
1st Field Artillery Regiment (Mountain) on exercise

The brigade is part of the Alpine Troops Command and based in the Piedmont region of northern Italy, with the 9th Alpini Regiment based in the central region of Abruzzo. The brigade headquarters is in the city of Turin. As of 4 October 2022 the brigade is organized as follows:

- Alpine Brigade "Taurinense", in Turin
  - 1st Alpini Command and Tactical Supports Unit, in Turin
    - Command Company
    - Signal Company
  - Regiment "Nizza Cavalleria" (1st), in Bellinzago Novarese
    - Command and Logistic Support Squadron
    - Armored Squadrons Group
  - 2nd Alpini Regiment, in Cuneo
    - Command and Logistic Support Company
    - Alpini Battalion "Saluzzo"
  - 3rd Alpini Regiment, in Pinerolo
    - Command and Logistic Support Company
    - Alpini Battalion "Susa"
  - 9th Alpini Regiment, in L'Aquila
    - Command and Logistic Support Company
    - Alpini Battalion "L'Aquila"
    - Alpini Battalion "Vicenza"
  - 1st Field Artillery Regiment (Mountain), in Fossano
    - Command and Logistic Support Battery
    - 7th Surveillance, Target Acquisition and Tactical Liaison Battery
    - Mountain Artillery Group "Aosta"
  - 32nd Engineer Regiment, in Fossano
    - Command and Logistic Support Company
    - 30th Sapper Battalion
  - Logistic Regiment "Taurinense", in Rivoli
    - Command and Logistic Support Company
    - Logistic Battalion

== Equipment ==
The Alpini regiments are equipped with Bv 206S tracked all-terrain carriers and Lince light multirole vehicles. The maneuver support companies of the Alpini regiments are equipped with 120 mm mortars and Spike anti-tank guided missiles. The cavalry regiment is equipped with Centauro tank destroyers and VTLM Lince vehicles. The brigade's artillery regiment fields 12× FH-70 155 mm howitzers and 6× Mod 56 105 mm howitzers.

== Gorget patches ==
The personnel of the brigade's units wears the following gorget patches:

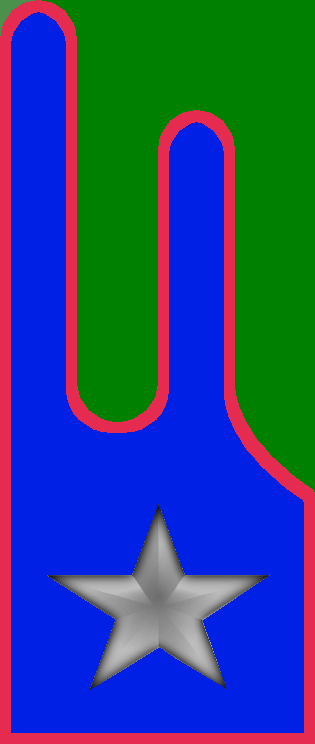
1st Alpini Command and Tactical Supports Unit

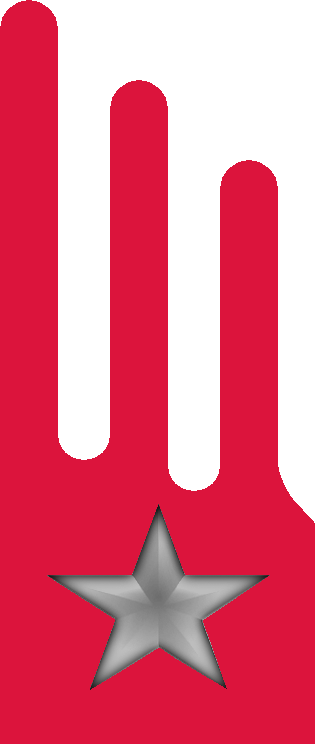
Regiment "Nizza Cavalleria" (1st)

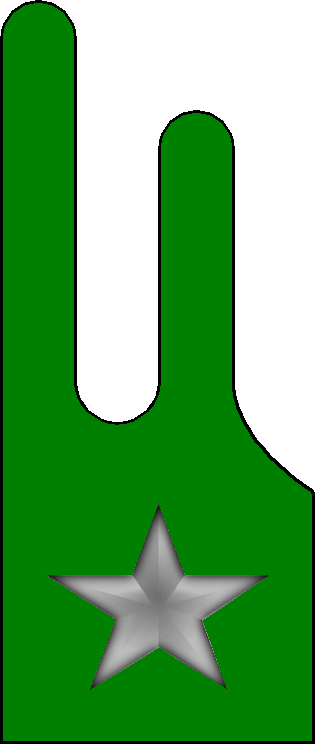
2nd Alpini, 3rd Alpini, and 9th Alpini Regiment

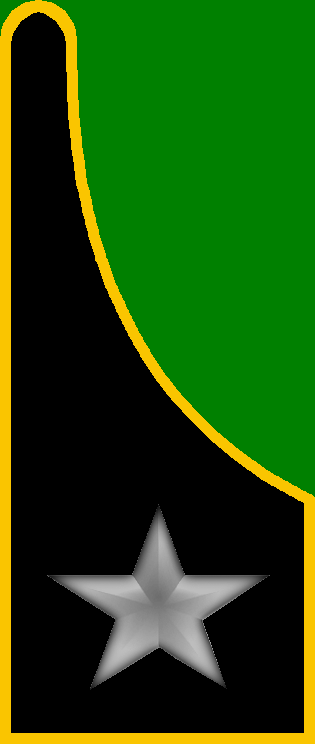
1st Field Artillery Regiment (Mountain)

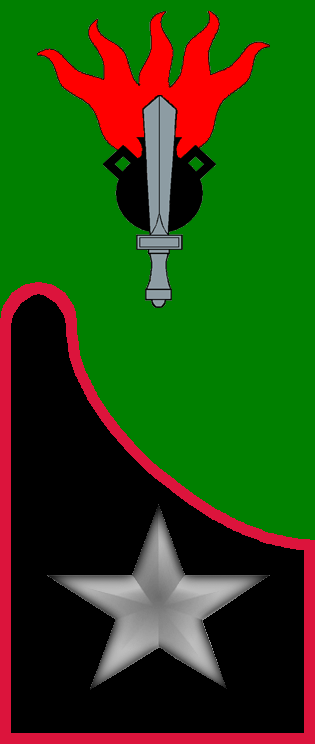
32nd Engineer Regiment

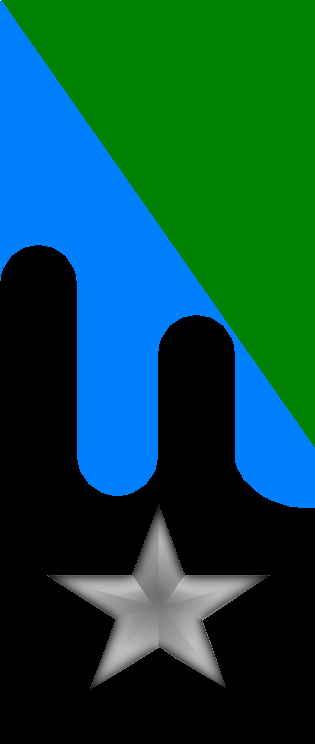
Logistic Regiment "Taurinense"

== Sources ==
Italian Army Homepage: History of the Alpine Brigade Taurinense
