= Logistic Battalion "Taurinense" =

Inactive Italian Army mountain logistics unit

- Battaglione Logistico "Taurinense"
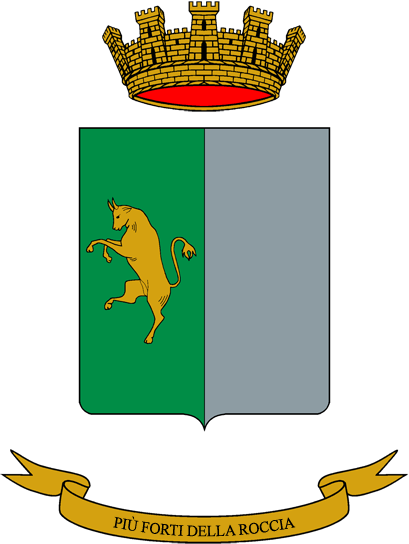
- Battalion coat of arms
- Active: 1 Dec. 1975 – 1 Feb. 2001
- Country: Italy
- Branch: Italian Army
- Type: Military logistics
- Part of: Alpine Brigade "Taurinense"
- Garrison/HQ: Rivoli
- Motto(s): "Più forti della roccia"
- Anniversaries: 22 May 1916 – Battle of Asiago
- Decorations: 1× Bronze Cross of Army Merit

Insignia
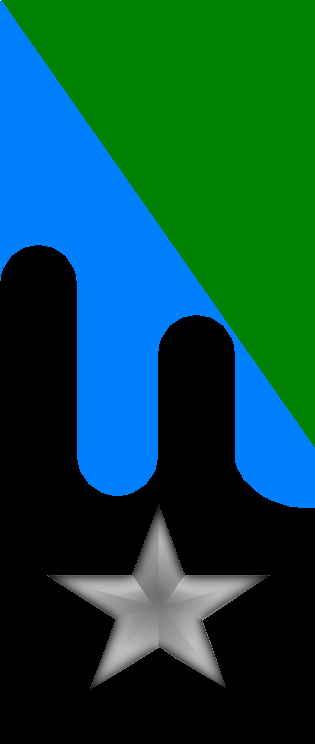
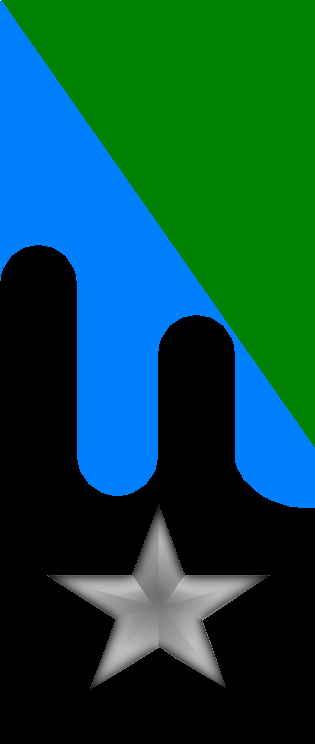
- Unit gorget patches

The Logistic Battalion "Taurinense" (Italian: Battaglione Logistico "Taurinense") is an inactive military logistics battalion of the Italian Army, which was assigned to the Alpine Brigade "Taurinense". As an alpine unit the battalion is associated with the army's mountain infantry speciality, the Alpini, with whom the battalion shares the distinctive Cappello Alpino. The battalion's anniversary falls, as for all units of the Italian Army's Transport and Materiel Corps, on 22 May, the anniversary of the Royal Italian Army's first major use of automobiles to transport reinforcements to the Asiago plateau to counter the Austro-Hungarian Asiago Offensive in May 1916.

== History ==
=== Cold War ===
The battalion is the spiritual successor of the logistic units of the 1st Alpine Division "Taurinense", which had fought in the Italian invasion of France and the Italian occupation of Yugoslavia of World War II, and of the logistic units of the Alpine Brigade "Taurinense", which was formed on 15 April 1952 in Turin.

On 1 December 1962, the Service Units Command "Taurinense" was formed in Rivoli, which consisted of a mobile vehicle park, a mobile workshop, and an auto unit. In 1963, the command received a provisions section, while the mobile vehicle park and mobile workshop merged to form the Resupply, Repairs, Recovery Unit "Taurinense". In 1964, the command received a medical section, the 101st Field Hospital, and a mountain vehicles section equipped with Moto Guzzi Triporteurs.

On 1 January 1967, the Service Units Command "Taurinense" was reorganized as Services Grouping Command "Taurinense", which consisted of a command, the Auto Unit "Taurinense", a provisions company, the Resupply, Repairs, Recovery Unit "Taurinense", a medical section, and the 101st Field Hospital.

In 1973, the Medical Battalion "Taurinense" was formed, which consisted of the 101st Field Hospital for Arctic Climates, the 102nd Field Hospital, and a medical company. The battalion was meant to support the Tactical Group "Susa", which was Italy's contribution to NATO's Allied Command Europe Mobile Force-Land AMF(L), which, in case of war with the Warsaw Pact, would have reinforced NATO's Allied Forces North Norway Command in Northern Norway.

On 1 December 1975, as part of the 1975 army reform, the Services Grouping Command "Taurinense" was reorganized as Logistic Battalion "Taurinense". Initially the battalion consisted of a command, a command and services platoon, two light logistic units, a medium logistic unit, two reserve medical units, and the 101st Field Hospital. On 1 June 1978, the 101st Field Hospital was reorganized as Airmobile Medical Unit "Taurinense". The unit was then transferred from the battalion to the brigade's command. Afterwards the battalion fielded 712 men (42 officers, 92 non-commissioned officers, and 588 soldiers). On 12 November 1976, the President of the Italian Republic Giovanni Leone granted with decree 846 the battalion a flag.

In 1981, the two medical units merged into a single reserve medical unit. On 1 November 1981, the battalion was reorganized and consisted afterwards of the following units:

- Logistic Battalion "Taurinense", in Rivoli
  - Command and Services Company
  - Supply Company
  - Maintenance Company
  - Medium Transport Company
  - Medical Unit (Reserve)

=== Recent times ===
In May and June 1991, personnel of the battalion was deployed to Northern Iraq for Operation Provide Comfort. From February to October 1993, the battalion participated in the United Nations Operation in Mozambique in Mozambique. For its conduct and work in Mozambique the battalion was awarded a Bronze Cross of Army Merit, which was affixed to the battalion's flag.

On 1 February 2001, the Logistic Battalion "Taurinense" was disbanded and some of its personnel joined the 1st Logistic Support Regiment "Monviso". Shortly thereafter the battalion's flag was transferred to the Shrine of the Flags in the Vittoriano in Rome for safekeeping.

== See also ==
- Military logistics
