= Anthony Neyrot =

Italian Dominican martyr (1425–1460)

Blessed Anthony Neyrot OP
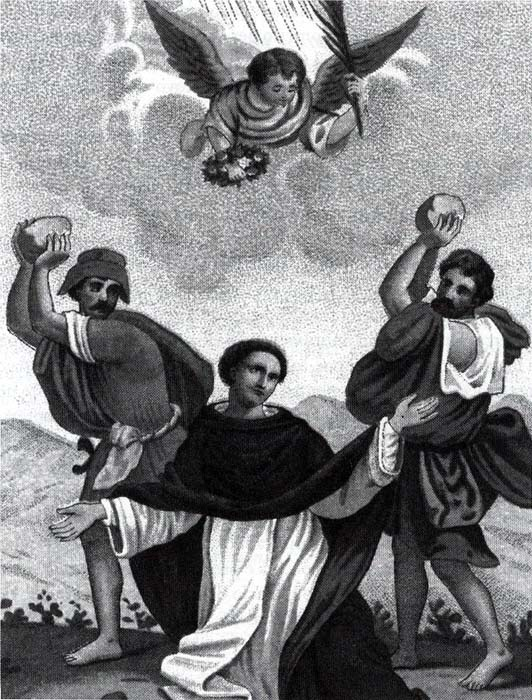
- The death of Blessed Anthony Neyrot.

Martyr
- Born: 1425; Rivoli, Duchy of Savoy, Holy Roman Empire
- Died: 10 April 1460; Tunis, Hafsid Kingdom
- Venerated in: Roman Catholic Church
- Beatified: 22 February 1767, Saint Peter's Basilica, Rome, Papal States by Pope Clement XIII (cultus approved)
- Feast: 10 April

Anthony Neyrot, OP (Italian: Antonio Neirotti; Piedmontese: Antòni Neyrot; 1425 – 10 April 1460) was an Italian Dominican priest and martyr. In 1458, Neyrot was captured by Barbary corsairs and abandoned Catholicism in exchange for better treatment. Some months later, he learned of the death of his mentor, Antoninus of Florence, which caused him to reconsider his actions. He was subsequently executed for renouncing Islam.

== Life ==
Anthony Neyrot was born in Rivoli (in modern-day Piedmont, Italy), and entered the Dominicans. After completing his studies, he was ordained and lived for a while at convent of San Marco in Florence where he studied under Antoninus of Florence. Unsatisfied, he asked for a mission change and he was sent to Sicily. Still unhappy, he left for Naples. On this voyage, his ship was captured by Moorish pirates, and along with the other passengers, was taken to North Africa.

It would appear that the Muslim caliph of Tunis favored Anthony, as he was treated kindly, and was not even confined, until his arrogance angered his captors. Antony was impatient and resented the idea of being a prisoner. Living on a diet of bread and water, he soon collapsed. He then denied his faith in order to buy his freedom.

Anthony lost all faith in Christianity and began to translate the Koran. He was adopted by the king and married a Turkish lady of high rank. Then came news of the death of Antoninus. This led to a radical change in Anthony's attitudes. He had a dream in which Antoninus appeared to him; the conversation that transpired caused Anthony to resolve to readopt the faith which he had left behind, although such an action would result in his certain death.

Finding a Dominican priest, Anthony confessed his sins, and on Palm Sunday of 1460, he publicly asked forgiveness from his fellow Catholics and was thereafter readmitted to his order.

Wanting his reconversion to be as public as his denial had been, Anthony waited until the king held a public procession. Having confessed and made his private reconciliation with God, Anthony mounted the palace steps where all could see him clothed in a Dominican habit. Anthony proclaimed his faith, and the outraged king ordered that he be stoned to death. Anthony was killed on Holy Thursday, 1460.

== Veneration ==
Anthony's body was recovered at great expense by merchants from Genoa and was returned to Rivoli, where his tomb became a place of pilgrimage. Miracles were attributed to it, and an annual procession was held at his shrine, wherein all the present-day members of his family dressed in black and revered his memory.

Blessed Anthony's cultus was approved by Pope Clement XIII on 22 February 1767.

== See also ==
- Saint Anthony Neyrot, patron saint archive
