= Mina Leonesi =

Italian opera singer

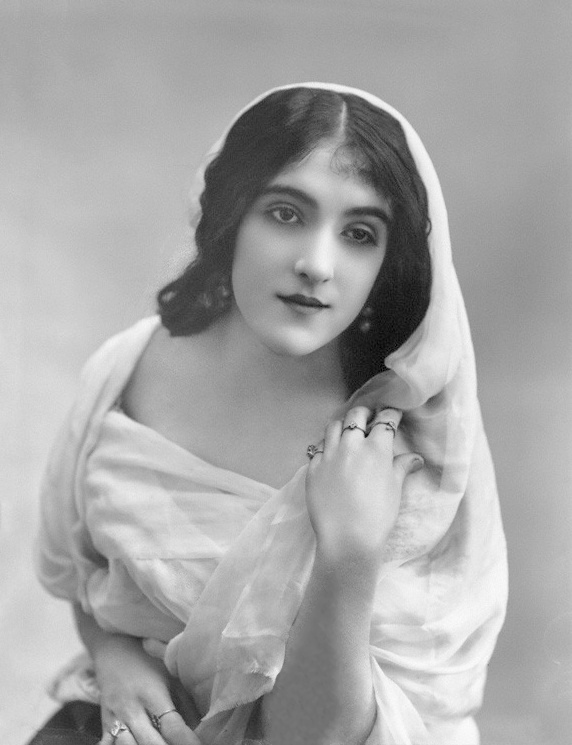
- Mina Leonesi c. 1914
- Born: c. 1890; Rivoli, Piedmont, Kingdom of Italy
- Died: c. 1930 (aged 39–40); Lombardy, Italy
- Occupations: Opera Singer & Actress

Guglielmina 'Mina' Leonesi (c. 1890 – c. 1930) was an Italian opera singer and actress, active in the early 20th century.

Mina was born to a middle-class family in Rivoli, Italy, c.1890. Though predominantly based in Milan and appearing in productions staged at La Scala, Mina also travelled internationally with her work, including appearances in Bluff King Hal – a romantic opera by American composer Humphrey John Stewart, based on the life of English King Henry VIII – in 1914.

Mina is featured as a sitter in five photographic portraits by renowned British-Italian high society photographer Alexander Bassano. Bassano had also famously photographed Queen Victoria and Lord Kitchener, the portrait of whom created the World War I recruiting poster Your Country Needs You.

The photographic plates featuring Mina Leonesi from the London Bassano Studios are held in the National Portrait Gallery, London. The National Portrait Gallery holds a large number of the fashion-related plates; Mina was noted for her beauty, and her operatic roles in historical costume were very fashionable for the period.

Mina had two children, a son (Anthony) and a daughter (Antoinette). Mina died in Italy soon after her daughter, Antoinette, died of pneumonia.
