= 32nd Engineer Regiment (Italy) =

Active Italian Army combat engineer unit

- 32° Reggimento Genio Guastatori
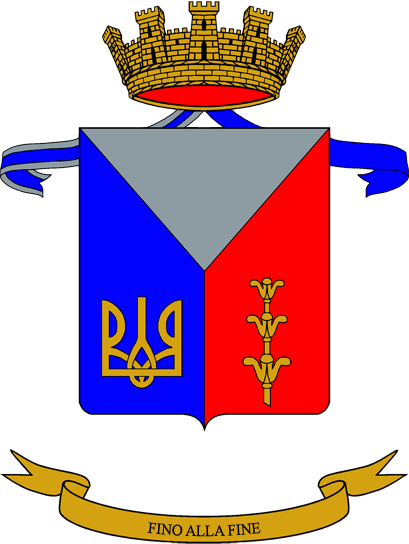
- Regimental coat of arms
- Active: 29 Sept. 2004 – today
- Country: Italy
- Branch: Italian Army
- Role: Combat engineers
- Part of: Alpine Brigade "Taurinense"
- Garrison/HQ: Fossano
- Motto: "Fino alla fine"
- Anniversaries: 24 June 1918 – Second Battle of the Piave River
- Decorations: 1× Silver Medal of Military Valor; 1× Bronze Medal of Military Valor

Insignia
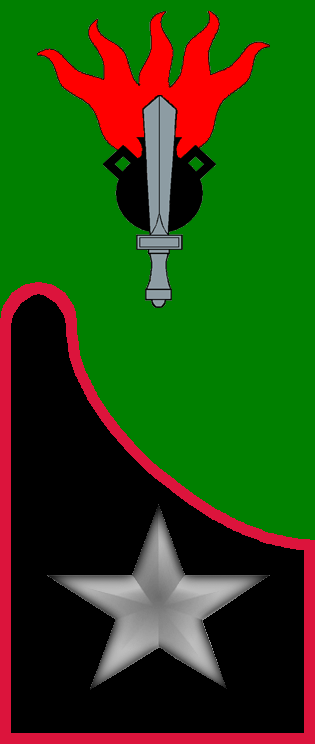
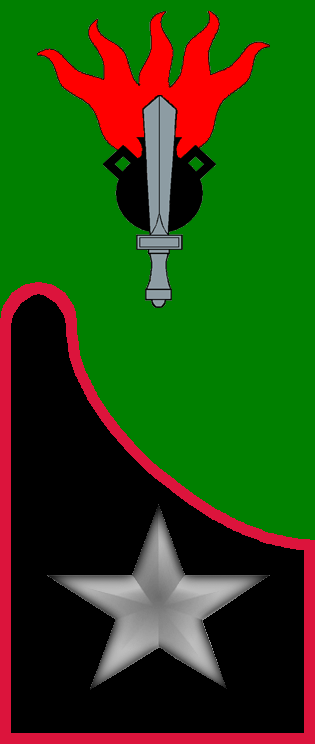
- Alpine sappers gorget patches

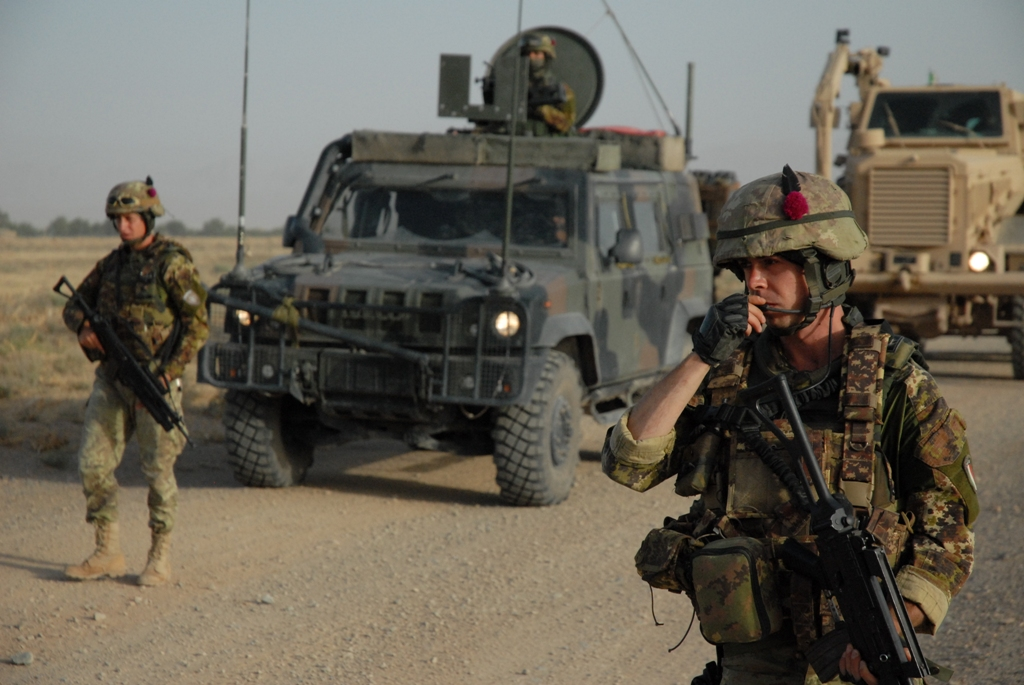
Soldier from the 32nd Engineer Regiment in Afghanistan

The 32nd Engineer Regiment (Italian: 32° Reggimento Genio Guastatori) is a military engineering regiment of the Italian Army based in Fossano in Piedmont. The unit is assigned to the Alpine Brigade "Taurinense" and the army's youngest engineer regiment. On 1 September 2002, the 32nd Engineer Battalion was formed, which, on 24 September 2004, was redesignated XXX Sappers Battalion and then entered the newly formed 32nd Engineer Regiment. The regiment's number was chosen to commemorate the XXXII Sappers Battalion, which fought in the Western Desert campaign of World War II, while the battalion's number commemorates the XXX Sappers Battalion, which fought in the Italian campaign on the Eastern Front. The regiment specializes in mountain warfare and shares with the other units of the Alpine Brigade "Taurinense" the distinctive Cappello Alpino. The regiment's anniversary falls, as for all engineer units, on 24 June 1918, the last day of the Second Battle of the Piave River.

== History ==
=== World War II ===
During World War II the Royal Italian Army's Sappers School in Civitavecchia formed nine sappers companies, which were equipped and trained to assault fortified positions. From 10 August to 30 September 1940 the first four companies were trained, which were numbered 1st, 2nd, 7th, and 8th sappers companies. The second training lasted from 5 October to 18 November 1940 and this time five companies were trained: 3rd, 4th, 5th, 6th, and 9th sappers companies. The personnel for the 9th Sappers Company was drawn from volunteers of the infantry's Alpini speciality. Each company fielded four assault platoons of 41 men per platoon. Each assault platoon consisted of two sapper teams, which were equipped with Model 38 submachine guns, hand grenades, and bangalore torpedoes, and two support teams, which were equipped with heavy machine guns and light mortars. In January 1941, the 3rd Sappers Company and the 4th Sappers Company were sent Libya to shore up the crumbling Italian 10th Army, which was being annihilated in the British Operation Compass. The companies, which had remained in Italy, were then grouped in battalions, the first of which was the XXX Sappers Battalion, which was activated on 15 March 1941, and consisted of the 5th, 6th, and 9th sappers companies. On 18 April 1941, the XXXI Sappers Battalion was formed, which consisted of the 1st, 2nd, 7th, and 8th sappers companies. On 15 August 1941, the XXXII Sappers Battalion was formed in North Africa with the 3rd Sappers Company and the 4th Sappers Company.

==== XXXII Sappers Battalion ====
On 1 December 1940, the Sappers School formally activated the 3rd Sappers Company and the 4th Sappers Company. On 14 January 1941, the two companies were sent to Libya, where they formed a provisional battalion, which was assigned to the 1st Special Engineer Grouping. As part of Rommel's Afrika Korps the battalion participated in Rommel's first offensive Operation Sonnenblume. On 15 August 1941, congruent to the activation of Panzer Army Africa, the battalion was designated as XXXII Sappers Battalion. The battalion fought in the battles of the Western Desert campaign until the battalion had to be disbanded on 1 August 1942 due to the losses it had suffered in the First Battle of El Alamein. The battalion's 72 survivors were transferred to the XXXI Sappers Battalion, which was commanded by Paolo Caccia Dominioni and attached to the 185th Infantry Division "Folgore" for the Second Battle of El Alamein. After the Axis defeat in the Second Battle of El Alamein the XXXI Sappers Battalion retreated with the rest of the Italian-German forces to Tunisia, where the battalion surrendered to allied forces at the end of the Tunisian campaign on 13 May 1943. For its service in North Africa the XXXII Sappers Battalion was awarded a Bronze Medal of Military Valor.

==== XXX Sappers Battalion ====
On 15 March 1941, the depot of the 4th Engineer Regiment in Verona formed the command of the XXX Sappers Battalion. The newly formed battalion received the 5th Sappers Company, 6th Sappers Company, and 9th Sappers Company, which had all been formed by the Sappers School in Civitavecchia. At the time of the battalion command's formation the three companies were fighting in the Greco-Italian War and consequently, the command quickly travelled to Albania to take command of the assigned companies. After the German invasion of Greece and the Greek surrender the battalion returned to Italy, where it was garrisoned in Ronchi dei Legionari. During this time the 6th Sappers Company was transferred to the 80th Infantry Division "La Spezia" and the 5th Sappers Company was renumbered 6th Sappers Company.

On 17 March 1942, the battalion was assigned to support the Alpine Army Corps of the Italian 8th Army, which was sent to the fight on the Eastern Front. The battalion moved to Bruneck, where the battalion's troops received mountain warfare training. The battalion left Italy on 21 July 1942 and arrived in Luhansk in early September 1942. The Alpine Army Corps then marched to the Don river, where the Italian 8th Army covered the left flank of the German 6th Army that spearheaded the German offensive of 1942 towards Stalingrad. On 12 December 1942, the Red Army commenced Operation Little Saturn, which, in its first stage, attacked and encircled the Italian II Army Corps and XXXV Army Corps, to the southeast of the Alpine Army Corps. On 13 January 1943, the Red Army launched the second stage of Operation Little Saturn with the Voronezh Front encircling and destroying the Hungarian Second Army to the northwest of the Alpine Army Corps.

On the evening of 17 January 1943, the Alpine Army Corps commander, General Gabriele Nasci, ordered a full retreat. At this point only the 2nd Alpine Division "Tridentina" was still capable of conducting combat operations. The 40,000-strong mass of stragglers — Alpini and Italians from other commands, plus German and Hungarians — followed the "Tridentina" division, which led the way westwards to the new Axis lines. As the Soviets had already occupied every village, bitter battles had to be fought to clear the way. The retreat through the frozen steppe and constant skirmishes with Soviet forces decimated the XXX Sappers Battalion, which barely escaped annihilation during the Battle of Nikolayevka. Of the 23 officers, 30 non-commissioned officers and 427 enlisted present on 1 January 1943 only 121 survived the retreat from the Don and Battle of Nikolayevka. In late January 1943, the battalion was disbanded due to the losses it had suffered. For its conduct and sacrifice on the Eastern Front the XXX Sappers Battalion was awarded a Silver Medal of Military Valor.

=== Cold War ===
During the 1975 army reform the 3rd Sappers Fortification Regiment's XXXI Sappers Fortification Battalion was renamed 3rd Sappers Battalion "Verbano". The 3rd Sappers Battalion "Verbano" consisted of the 30th, 31st, and 32nd sappers companies, each of which carried the traditions of one of the three World War II-era sappers battalions.

=== Recent times ===
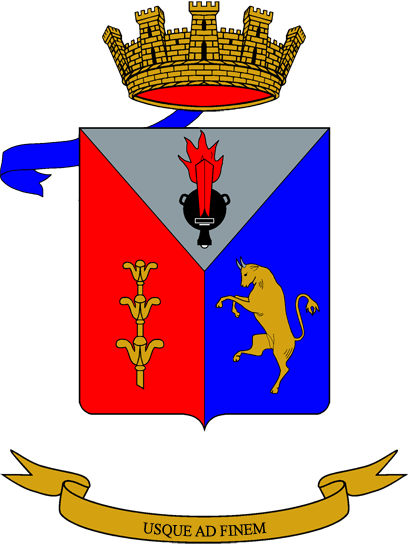
32nd Engineer Battalion coat of arms 2002–2004

On 1 February 2002, the Ferrovieri Engineer Regiment formed an Operations Battalion in Ozzano dell'Emilia, which incorporated the personnel and materiel of the 2nd Ferrovieri Battalion (Operations) in Turin. On 31 August of the same year, the 2nd Ferrovieri Battalion (Operations) was disbanded and the next day, 1 September 2002, its remaining personnel was used to form the 32nd Engineer Battalion. On the same day, the Command and Tactical Supports Unit "Taurinense" of the Alpine Brigade "Taurinense" transferred the Engineer Company "Taurinense" to the new battalion, which then joined the "Taurinense" brigade. On 28 May 2004, the President of the Italian Republic Carlo Azeglio Ciampi granted the battalion a flag.

On 29 September 2004, the 32nd Engineer Battalion lost its autonomy and the next day the battalion entered the newly formed 32nd Engineer Regiment as XXX Sappers Battalion, thus unifying the traditions of the two preceding sappers battalions. The Silver Medal of Military Valor and Bronze Medal of Military Valor, which were awarded to the XXX Sappers Battalion respectively XXXII Sappers Battalion during World War II, were affixed to the regiment's flag and added to the regiment's coat of arms. On 15 December 2016, the regiment moved from Turin to Fossano.

== Organization ==
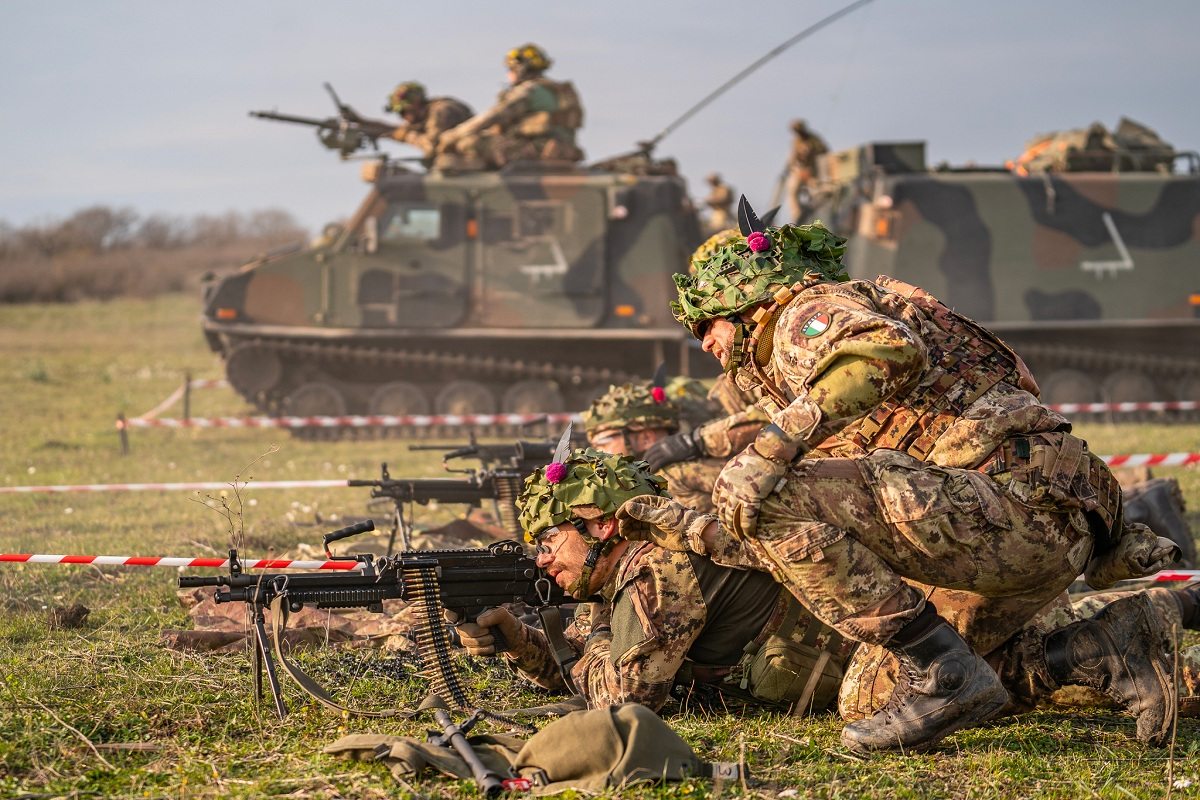
32nd Engineer Regiment troops during the "Monte Romano 1–25" exercise 2025

As of 2024 the 32nd Engineer Regiment is organized as follows:

- 32nd Engineer Regiment, in Fossano
  - 5th Command and Logistic Support Company
  - XXX Sappers Battalion
    - 3rd Sappers Company
    - 4th Deployment Support Company
    - 6th Sappers Company
    - 9th Sappers Company

== See also ==
- Alpine Brigade "Taurinense"
