= Alpini Battalion "L'Aquila" =

Italian Army mountain infantry unit

- Battaglione Alpini "L'Aquila"
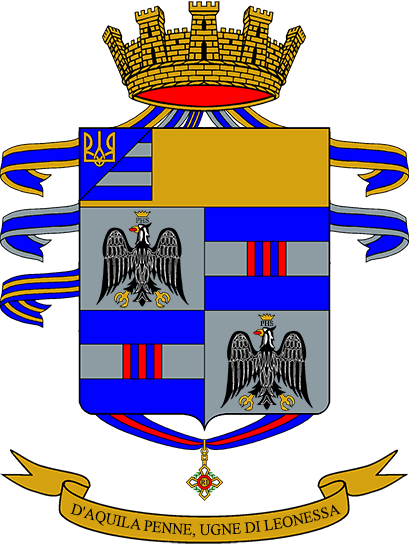
- Battalion coat of arms
- Active: 21 April 1935 — 8 Sept. 1943; 1 Oct. 1975 — today
- Country: Italy
- Branch: Italian Army
- Type: Mountain Infantry
- Part of: 9th Alpini Regiment
- Garrison/HQ: L'Aquila
- Mottos: "D'Aquila Penne, Ugne di Leonessa"
- Anniversaries: 23 April 1941
- Decorations: 1x Military Order of Italy; 2x Gold Medals of Military Valor; 2x Silver Medals of Military Valor; 1x Bronze Medal of Army Valor

Insignia
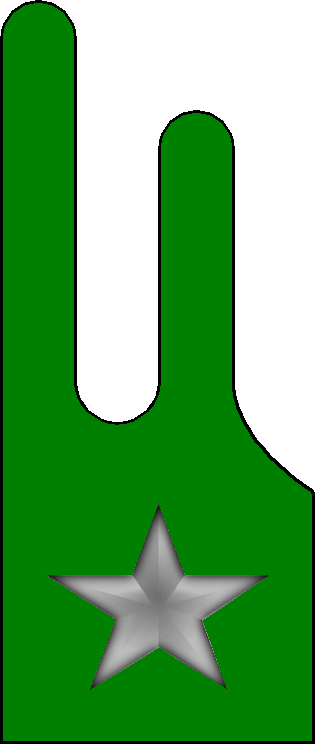
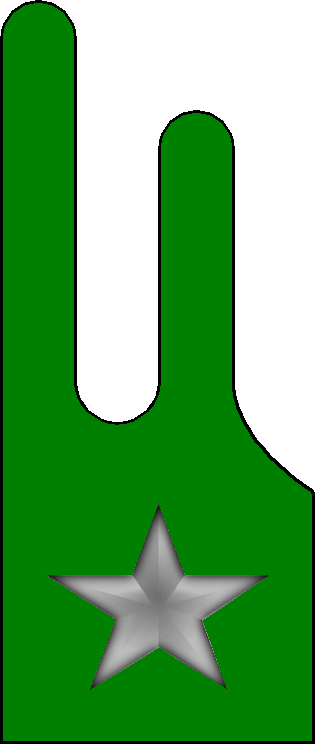
- Alpini gorget patches

The Alpini Battalion "L'Aquila" (Italian: Battaglione Alpini "L'Aquila") is a mountain warfare regiment of the Italian Army based in L'Aquila in Abruzzo. The regiment belongs to the Italian Army's Alpini infantry speciality and is assigned to the 9th Alpini Regiment. In 1935, the Royal Italian Army's 9th Alpini Regiment formed the battalion in the city of Gorizia.

In 1935 the 9th Alpini Regiment was assigned to the 3rd Alpine Division "Julia", with which it served during World War II in the Greco-Italian War, during which the division suffered heavy losses. For its service and sacrifice on the Greek Front the 9th Alpini Regiment was awarded Italy's highest military honor the Gold Medal of Military Valor. In summer 1942 the division was transferred to the Eastern Front in the Soviet Union, where it was destroyed in winter 1942-43 during the Soviet Operation Little Saturn. The remnants of the division were repatriated in spring 1943. For its service and sacrifice on the Eastern Front the 9th Alpini Regiment was awarded a second Gold Medal of Military Valor. On 8 September 1943, the Armistice of Cassibile was announced and invading German forces disbanded the 9th Alpini Regiment.

In September 1944, the Italian Co-belligerent Army formed the Alpini Battalion "Abruzzi", which was assigned to the Special Infantry Regiment "Legnano" of the Combat Group "Legnano". In November 1944, the "Abruzzi" battalion was renamed Alpini Battalion "L'Aquila". The Combat Group "Legnano"fought on the allied side in the Italian campaign until the German surrender. After the war the "L'Aquila" battalion was assigned to the 8th Alpini Regiment and based in Tarvisio in Friuli-Venezia Giulia.

During the 1975 Italian Army reform the 8th Alpini Regiment was disbanded, while the Alpini Battalion "L'Aquila" was disbanded in Tarvisio and then reformed in L'Aquila as an autonomous unit. The same year the Alpini Battalion "Vicenza" was reformed as a training unit. Both battalions were assigned to the Alpine Brigade "Julia". In 1976, the "Vicenza" battalion was assigned the flag and traditions of the 9th Alpini Regiment, while the "L'Aquila" battalion was granted a new flag.

In 1992, the Alpini Battalion "L'Aquila" lost its autonomy and entered the reformed 9th Alpini Regiment. However, the original flag of the 9th Alpini Regiment remained with the Alpini Battalion "Vicenza" until the battalion was disbanded in 1996. Afterwards the flag was transferred to the 9th Alpini Regiment in L'Aquila. The battalion's anniversary falls on 23 April 1941, the last day of the Greco-Italian War, during which the 9th Alpini Regiment earned its first Gold Medal of Military Valor.

== History ==
=== Interwar years ===
On 21 April 1935, the 9th Alpini Regiment formed the Alpini Battalion "L'Aquila" in the city of Gorizia with personnel drawn from the Alpini Battalion "Vicenza" and Alpini Battalion "Bassano". The new battalion had its recruiting center in the city of L'Aquila in Abruzzo and was therefore assigned the traditions, honors and company numbers of the World War I Alpini Battalion "Monte Berico". The "Monte Berico" battalion had been formed by the 6th Alpini Regiment on 1 December 1915 with recruits drafted in Abruzzo. The "Monte Berico" battalion fought in the alpine areas of the Italian front and was awarded a Silver Medal of Military Valor for its conduct during the Battle of Asiago at Vallarsa in May and June 1916, for the conquest and subsequent defense of Austro-Hungarian positions on the Pasubio massif from 10 September to 10 October 1916, for its conduct on Cima Grama in the Val Posina in July 1916, its conduct on Monte Čukla in October 1917 and on Monte Badenecche in December 1917, for its conduct in the Val Frenzela on 28-29 January 1918, and its conduct during the Battle of Vittorio Veneto in October-November 1918. On 19 August 1919, the Alpini Battalion "Monte Berico" was disbanded.

The fascist poet Gabriele D'Annunzio created the new battalion's motto: "D'Aquila Penne, Ugne di Leonessa", which translates literally as "Eagle feathers, Lioness claws", however it also is a wordplay as L'Aquila, Penne, Ugne and Leonessa are towns in Abruzzo, where the battalion drafted its recruits. Since 1886 Alpini soldiers and non-commissioned officers were issued thread tufts, called Nappina in Italian, which were clipped to the Cappello Alpino headdress, and colored white for the troops of a regiment's first battalion, red for the troops of a regiment's second battalion, green for the troops of a regiment's third battalion, and blue for the troops of a regiment's fourth battalion. As first battalion of the 9th Alpini Regiment, the "L'Aquila" battalion received a white Nappina.

The 9th Alpini Regiment was assigned to the III Superior Alpine Command "Julio", which on 31 October 1935 was reorganized as 3rd Alpine Division "Julia". The division also included the 7th Alpini Regiment, 9th Alpini Regiment, 9th Alpini Regiment, and 3rd Alpine Artillery Regiment "Julia".

On 7 April 1939, Italy invaded Albania and by the middle of April the 3rd Alpine Division "Julia" moved to Northern Albania, where its regiments garrisoned the border with the Kingdom of Yugoslavia.

=== World War II ===
==== Greco-Italian War ====
On 10 June 1940, Italy entered World War II and the Alpini Battalion "L'Aquila" consisted of a command company, and the 93rd, 108th, and 143rd Alpini companies. In September 1940, the 3rd Alpine Division "Julia" moved from Northern to Southern Albania and took up positions along the border with the Kingdom of Greece for the upcoming Italian invasion of Greece. On 28 October 1940, Italian forces invaded Greece and the 3rd Alpine Division "Julia" engaged Greek forces in the Battle of Pindus, during which the "Julia" division suffered heavy casualties. On 10 November, the "Julia" division was taken out of the line, but only four days later it had to return to the front in the Berat sector, where it came under heavy Greek attacks until 8 December. On 23 December 1940, the "Julia" division was again attacked by the Greeks; the attack lasted until 31 December and forced the division to retreat to the Mali i Qarrishtës ridge in extreme weather conditions. On 8 January 1941, a Greek offensive in the Berat sector hit the "Julia" division hard and the following day the division fell back once more. On 21 January 1941, the division was down to a single regiment with three understrength battalions. The remains of the "Julia" were withdrawn and transferred to Mavrovo, near Vlorë.

At the end of February the division, now 10,500 men strong, was sent again to the first line; on 24 February it was deployed on Mali i Golikut and along the Zagoria Valley. On 28 February a new battle was fought in the Tepelenë sector; the "Julia" division, as the last Italian unit defending the town, was attacked by the 2nd Greek Division, but managed to hold the front while suffering heavy casualties. On 7 March the Greeks attacked on Mali i Golikut, and two days later they renewed their attack, causing heavy losses; by 11 March the Greek offensive ended without taking Tepelenë, and both the "Julia" division and the two Greek divisions involved in the attack (the 2nd and the 17th) were worn out by the heavy fighting and losses.

In April 1941, following the German invasion and Axis occupation of Greece, the division was transferred to the Corinth Canal area and occupied the Peloponnese. During the Greco-Italian War the division had suffered overall 9,317 casualties: 49 officers and 1,625 soldiers during October–November 1940, 153 officers and 3,644 soldiers between December 1940 and January 1941, and 116 officers and 3,730 soldiers between February and April 1941. For its service and sacrifice on the Greek front between 28 October 1940 and 23 April 1941 the 9th Alpini Regiment was awarded a Gold Medal of Military Valor, which was affixed to the 9th Alpini Regiment's flag and added to the regiment's coat of arms.

On 15 February 1942, the 9th Alpini Regiment formed a support weapons company for each of its three battalions and the Alpini Battalion "L'Aquila" received the 119th Support Weapons Company. These companies were equipped with Breda M37 machine guns, and 45mm Mod. 35 and 81mm Mod. 35 mortars.

==== Eastern Front ====
On 2 March 1942, the 3rd Alpine Division "Julia" was assigned, together with the 2nd Alpine Division "Tridentina" and 4th Alpine Division "Cuneense", to the Alpine Army Corps. The corps was assigned to the Italian 8th Army, which was readied to be deployed in summer 1942 to the Eastern Front.

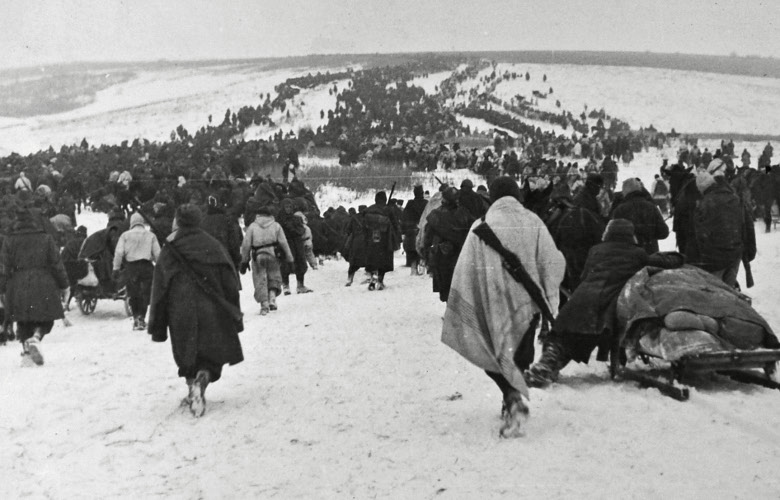
The Alpine Army Corps' retreat in Ukraine in January 1943

In July 1942 the three alpine division arrived in Eastern Ukraine, from where they marched eastwards towards the Don river. The Italian 8th Army covered the left flank of the German 6th Army, which spearheaded the German summer offensive of 1942 towards Stalingrad. On 12 December 1942, the Red Army commenced Operation Little Saturn, which, in its first stage, attacked and encircled the Italian II Army Corps and XXXV Army Corps, to the southeast of the Alpine Army Corps. On 13 January 1943, the Red Army launched the second stage of Operation Little Saturn with the Voronezh Front encircling and destroying the Hungarian Second Army to the northwest of the Alpine Army Corps.

On the evening of 17 January 1943, the Alpine Army Corps commander, General Gabriele Nasci, ordered a full retreat. At this point only the 2nd Alpine Division "Tridentina" was still capable of conducting combat operations. The 40,000-strong mass of stragglers — Alpini and Italians from other commands, plus German and Hungarians — followed the "Tridentina", which led the way westwards to the new Axis lines. As the Soviets had already occupied every village, bitter battles had to be fought to clear the way. On the morning of 26 January 1943, the spearheads of the "Tridentina" reached the hamlet of Nikolayevka, occupied by the Soviet 48th Guards Rifle Division. The Soviets had fortified the railway embankment on both sides of the village. General Nasci ordered a frontal assault and by nightfall the troops of the "Tridentina" division had managed to break through the Soviet lines. The Italian troops continued their retreat, which was no longer contested by Soviet forces.

On 11 February 1943, the survivors were counted and the worst hit battalion was the Alpini Battalion "L'Aquila", which had returned with just three officers and 159 Alpini out more than 1,500 men. For its bravery and sacrifice in the Soviet Union the 9th Alpini Regiment was awarded a Gold Medal of Military Valor, which was affixed to the regiment's flag and added to the regiment's coat of arms.

The 9th Alpini Regiment was still in the process of being rebuilt, when the Armistice of Cassibile was announced on 8 September 1943 and the same day the regiment was disbanded by invading German forces.

==== Italian Campaign ====
In September 1944, the Italian Co-belligerent Army formed the Alpini Battalion "Abruzzi" in Piedimonte Matese, which was assigned on 1 October 1944 to the Special Infantry Regiment "Legnano". The regiment then joined the Combat Group "Legnano", which was equipped with British materiel and assigned to the Polish II Corps. On 25 November 1944, the "Abruzzi" battalion was renamed Alpini Battalion "L'Aquila". The Combat Group "Legnano"fought on the allied side in the Italian campaign until the German surrender. For its service and conduct in the Italian Campaign the Alpini Battalion "L'Aquila" was awarded a Silver Medal of Military Valor.

=== Cold War ===
On 1 April 1946, an Alpini regiment was formed in Padua, which was initially designated 5th Alpini Regiment as it was formed within the area overseen by the V Territorial Military Command. On the same date the new regiment received the Alpini Battalion "L'Aquila" from the Special Infantry Regiment "Legnano". On 15 April 1946, the regiment was renumbered as 8th Alpini Regiment. On 15 October 1949, the regiment was assigned to the newly formed Alpine Brigade "Julia". On 1 July 1950, the regiment formed a mortar company for each of its battalions. At the time the Alpini Battalion "L'Aquila" consisted of the following units:

- Alpini Battalion "L'Aquila", in Tarvisio
  - Command and Services Company
  - 93rd, 108th, and 143rd Alpini Company
  - 119th Mortar Company, with 81mm M29 mortars

During the 1975 army reform the army disbanded the regimental level and newly independent battalions were granted for the first time their own flags. On 31 August 1975, the Alpini Battalion "L'Aquila" in Tarvisio was disbanded. The next day, on 1 September 1975, the battalion was reformed as an autonomous unit in L'Aquila, with the personnel of the Recruits Training Battalion "Julia", which had been disbanded a day earlier in that city. On the same day, 1 September 1975, a new recruits training battalion was formed in Tolmezzo with personnel drawn from the disbanded Alpini Battalion "Gemona". The new battalion was designated Alpini Battalion "Vicenza". On 30 September 1975, the 8th Alpini Regiment was disbanded and the next day its battalions became autonomous units and were assigned to the Alpine Brigade "Julia".

After the reform the battalion "L'Aquila" consisted of a command, a command and services company, three Alpini companies, and a heavy mortar company with eight 120mm Mod. 63 mortars. The battalion fielded now 950 men (45 officers, 96 non-commissioned officers, and 809 soldiers). To support the "L'Aquila" battalion the Mountain Artillery Group "Conegliano" in Udine detached its 15th Battery, which moved to L'Aquila.

On 12 November 1976 the President of the Italian Republic Giovanni Leone assigned with decree 846 the flag and traditions of the 9th Alpini Regiment to the Alpini Battalion "Vicenza". With the same decree the Alpini Battalion "L'Aquila" was granted a new flag. At the same time the medals and military honors awarded to the "L'Aquila" battalion were transferred from the flag of the 9th Alpini Regiment, to the battalion's new flag, while medals and military honors awarded to the entire 9th Alpini Regiment were duplicated for the "L'Aquila" battalion's new flag. Consequently, the "L'Aquila" battalion's flag was decorated with one Military Order of Italy, the two Gold Medals of Military Valor awarded to the 9th Alpini Regiment, and the two Silver Medals of Military Valor awarded to the "Monte Berico" battalion in World War I, respectively the "L'Aquila" battalion in World War II. The awards were also added to the battalion's newly created coat of arms.

For its conduct and work after the 1980 Irpinia earthquake the Alpini Battalion "L'Aquila" was awarded a Bronze Medal of Army Valor, which was affixed to the battalion's flag and added to the battalion's coat of arms.

=== Recent times ===
On 4 September 1991, the Alpini Battalion "L'Aquila" lost its autonomy and the next day the battalion entered the newly formed Alpini Regiment "L'Aquila", which on 23 November 1992 was renamed 9th Alpini Regiment. However, as the flag of the original 9th Alpini Regiment was still assigned to the Alpini Battalion "Vicenza", the new 9th Alpini Regiment continued to use the flag and coat of arms of the Alpini Battalion "L'Aquila". During the same year the "Julia" brigade's Anti-tank Company was disbanded and its personnel, with their TOW anti-tank guided missiles, assigned to the mortar companies of the brigade's battalions. Consequently, the "L'Aquila" battalion's 119th Mortar Company was renamed 119th Support Weapons Company.

Between September 1993 and March 1994 the 8th Alpini Regiment served with the United Nations Operation in Mozambique. On 27 August 1996, the Alpini Battalion "Vicenza" was disbanded and the following 13 September the flag of the 9th Alpini Regiment arrived in L'Aquila. Consequently the flag of the Alpini Battalion "L'Aquila" was transferred to the Shrine of the Flags in the Vittoriano in Rome. With the arrival of the flag, the medals and awards, which had been affixed to the flag of the Alpini Battalion "L'Aquila", were transferred back to the flag of the 9th Alpini Regiment. With the flag the regiment also received the coat of arms, which had been used by the Alpini Battalion "Vicenza" since 1976.

In 2001 the "L'Aquila" battalion's 119th Support Weapons Company was split into the 119th Mortar Company and the 264th Anti-tank Company "Val Cismon". In 2011, the 264th Anti-tank Company "Val Cismon" was disbanded and its personnel integrated into the 119th Mortar Company, which was renamed 119th Maneuver Support Company. On 15 September 2002, the "L'Aquila" battalion became the first Alpini battalion to be commanded by a female officer, when Lieutenant Colonel Monica Segat assumed command of the battalion.

== Organization ==
As of 2024 the Alpini Battalion "L'Aquila" is organized as follows:

- Alpini Battalion "L'Aquila"
  - 93rd Alpini Company
  - 108th Alpini Company
  - 143rd Alpini Company
  - 119th Maneuver Support Company

The Alpini companies are equipped with Bv 206S tracked all-terrain carriers and Lince light multirole vehicles. The maneuver support company is equipped with 120 mm mortars and Spike MR anti-tank guided missiles.

== See also ==
- 9th Alpini Regiment
