= Cappello alpino =

Feature of the Italian Army's Alpini troops' uniform

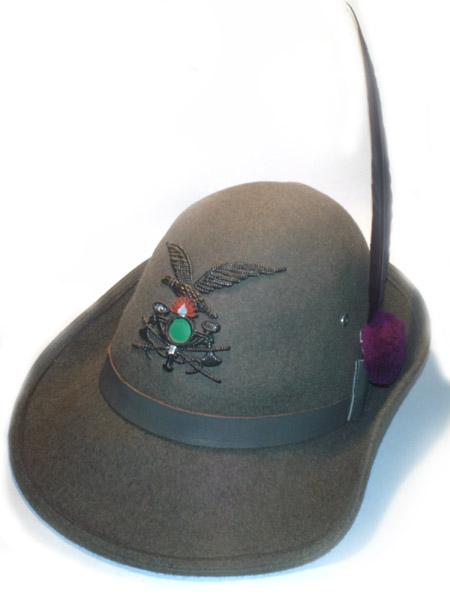
A Cappello Alpino of an Alpino Engineer: with Raven feather, Amaranth nappina and the heraldic symbol of the 2nd Alpine Engineer and 32nd Alpine Engineer Regiments

The Cappello Alpino (Alpine Hat) is the most distinctive feature of the Italian Army's Alpini troops' uniform. The Alpini are light Infantry troops, specializing in mountain combat. Initially, the Cappello was only issued to the Alpini, but soon the Cappello was adopted by the Alpini Corps' support units like artillery, signals, and engineers. Today the Cappello is issued to members of 15 Army regiments, 3 battalions and various high commands. Thanks to the black raven feather, which is carried on each Alpini soldier's Cappello, the Alpinis are known as Le Penne Nere ("The Black Feathers") in Italy. A nickname the Alpini quickly adopted for themselves.

== History ==
On 7 June 1883, the "Fiamme Verdi" (green flames) collar patches were introduced thus making the Alpini officially a specialty within the Italian infantry corps. At the same time, the issuing of the Cappello Alpino began. At first, the hat was a round black felt hat, nicknamed bombetta (bowler hat), but with the introduction of the new green-grey M1909 uniform in 1910 the hat was changed to the distinctive grey felt hat that is still retained today. The Cappello Alpino is made of grey felt a quarter of an inch thick. In the front, the rim is flattened to protect the face from rain and snow. On the left and right sides, four small metal-encrusted holes allow for an exchange of air. Around the lower half of the round top section, a green-grey leather band and for officers a golden braid encompasses the Cappello. Inside the Cappello has a two-inch black leather band where Cappello and head meet.

Each Cappello carries symbols which identify the wearer's rank, unit and specialization:

- the feather, symbolizing the Alpini Corps
- the fregio, a coat of arms indicating the regiment
- the nappina, a coloured tuft denoting the battalion (later the specialization too)
- the rank insignia for non-commissioned and commissioned officers

== Description ==
=== The feather ===
Each soldier is issued with a black raven feather, which he will carry at all times on the Cappello Alpino. When in combat the feather will be placed on the left side of the helmet. Officers above the rank of captain originally wore a white eagle feather, which has been replaced in later years by a white goose feather. Non-commissioned officers and officers up to the rank of captain continue to carry a black eagle feather. The feather is approximately 10-12 inches long and is carried with a slight backward and inbound inclination on the left side of the Cappello.

=== The Fregio ===
The fregio is a coat of arms indicating the wearer's regiment. It is black for soldiers, and golden for officers; both variants are sewn to the front of the Cappello. Today, soldiers serving on a permanent basis are issued the golden variant of the fregio too. Each fregio carries an eagle with spread wings on top and below symbols, which indicate the wearer's regiments specialization (i.e. artillery regiment, logistics regiment,...) and at the centre of the fregio a half-inch circle with the regiment's number.

The symbols indicating a regiment's specialization are:

- Alpini: eagle with spread wings, two blowing horns, crossed rifles
- Mountain Artillery: eagle with spread wings, two blowing horns, crossed cannons
- Engineers: eagle with spread wings, two blowing horns, crossed axes
- Sappers: eagle with spread wings, two blowing horns, a gladius short sword, a burning grenade, crossed axes
- Signals: eagle with spread wings, two blowing horns, round antenna, crossed axes and flashes of lightning
- Materials and Transport: eagle with spread wings above a spur gear with spread wings
- Medical officers: eagle with spread wings above a five-pointed star with the red cross symbol and crossed staff of Asclepius
- Medical troops: eagle with spread wings above a five-pointed star with the red cross symbol
- Alpini Generals: a stylized silver eagle with spread wings, holding a silver laurel wreath, with a central red shield inscribed with the silver letters "RI" (for Repubblica Italiana), all together on a ribbon of red cloth.

=== The Nappina ===
==== Description ====
Flag of the Kingdom of Italy

The nappina is a small piece of wood, on which a tuft of coloured wool threads is sewn. The piece of wood contains a little hole, in which the feather is sheathed. Also, a thin bent wire juts out from the wood to allow the nappina to be latched onto the left side of the Cappello Alpino. The nappina were first issued to distinguish between the battalions in an Alpini regiment:

- I battalion
- II battalion
- III battalion
- IV battalion and battalions not assigned to a regiment

The colours are the same as found on the Italian flag of the Kingdom of Italy. Soldiers of the Mountain Artillery units were issued a green tuft with a black patch in the middle onto which the number of their battery was written in yellow. Officers below the rank of general and non-commissioned officers wear a golden-coloured metal wrap and generals a silver-coloured metal wrap instead of the nappina. Later further nappinas were issued in various colours and forms.

==== Alpini ====
For an overview of the nappinas of all Alpini battalions see the main article about the Alpini.

Today the following units continue to carry the nappina:

- Morbegno Battalion (5th Alpini Regiment), Feltre Battalion (7th Alpini Regiment)
- Tolmezzo Battalion (8th Alpini Regiment), Vicenza Battalion (9th Alpini Regiment), Aosta Battalion (Alpini Formation Centre)
- Saluzzo Battalion (2nd Alpini Regiment), Bassano Battalion (6th Alpini Regiment)
- Susa Battalion (3rd Alpini Regiment), L'Aquila Battalion (9th Alpini Regiment)

==== Other Alpini units ====
The Alpini, not assigned to one of the traditional Alpini battalions, carry either a blue nappina or a blue nappina with a black roundel on which the type of superior unit is inscribed.

Nappina	Description	Units	Italian unit name
	blue, black roundel, white "CA"	Support units of the 4th Alpine Army Corps: 4th Alpine Army Corps Headquarters (1973–1997); 4th Alpine Army Corps Command Battalion (1973–1997); 4th Alpine Army Corps Alpini Parachutist Company (1963–1991); Alpini Parachutist Company Monte Cervino (1991–1996); Alpini Parachutist Battalion Monte Cervino (1996–2004)	Quartier generale del 4° Corpo d'Armata alpino; Reparto comando del 4° Corpo d'Armata alpino; Compagnia alpini paracadutisti del 4° Corpo d'Armata alpino; Compagnia alpini paracadutisti "Monte Cervino"; Battaglione alpini paracadutisti "Monte Cervino"
	blue, black roundel, white "TA"	Support units of the Alpine Troops Command (COMALP): COMALP Headquarters Battalion (1997–2001); Command and Tactical Support Battalion Tridentina (2001–today); 4th Alpini Parachutist Regiment (2004–today)	Reparto comando del COMALP; Reparto comando e supporti tattici "Tridentina"; 4º Reggimento alpini paracadutisti
	blue, black roundel, white "B"	Support units of the Alpine brigades: Brigade Command Platoons (1949–1958); Brigade Headquarters (1958–1975); Brigade Command and Signal Battalions (1975–1993); Brigade Command and Tactical Support Battalions (1993–today)	
	blue, black roundel, white "D"	Brigade Deposits (1934-1950s)	
	blue, black roundel, white "R"	Support units of the Alpini regiments: Regiment Command Companies (1948–1975); Regiment Mortar Companies (1948–1975); Command and Service Companies (1991–2001); Command and Logistic Support Companies (2001–today)	
	blue, black roundel, white "C/C"	Anti-tank Companies of the brigades (1975–1991)	
	blue	Schools and Training: Central Military Alpinism School (1934–1943); Military Alpine School (1948–1998); Alpine Training Center (1998–today); Alpini Training Battalions and Companies (1945–1975)	Scuola militare centrale di alpinismo; Scuola militare alpina; Centro addestramento alpino

==== Artillery ====
The Mountain Artillery units of the Alpine troops carry a green nappina with a black or yellow roundel on which the number of the battery or the type of superior unit is inscribed. The units in service, which carry an Artillery nappina, are the:

- 1st Mountain Artillery Regiment
- 2nd Mountain Artillery Regiment
- 3rd Mountain Artillery Regiment

Nappina	Description	Units	Italian unit name
	Green, black roundel, yellow number	Mountain Artillery Batteries (1934–today) (the number corresponds with a battery's number)	
	Green, black roundel, yellow "D"	Regimental Deposits (1934–1945)	
	Green, black roundel, yellow "RC"	Headquarter units (Italian: Reparto Comando): Artillery Regiment Headquarters (1934–1975); Artillery Group Headquarters (1934–1973)	
	Green, black roundel, yellow "CG"	Artillery Group Command and Service Batteries (1973–1992); Artillery Regiment Command and Service Batteries (1992–2001); Artillery Regiment Command and Logistic Support Batteries (2001–today)	
	Green, yellow roundel, black "CA"	Artillery units of the 4th Alpine Army Corps: 4th Heavy Field Artillery Regiment (1975–1986); 4th Heavy Field Artillery Group Pusteria (1986–1991); 184th Heavy Field Artillery Group Filottrano (1986–1991); 4th then 3rd Artillery Specialists Group Bondone (1975/86-1986/92)	4º Reggimento artiglieria pesante campale; 4º Gruppo Artiglieria pesante campale "Pusteria"; 184º Gruppo Artiglieria pesante campale "Filottrano"; 4° e poi 3º Gruppo Specialisti Artiglieria "Bondone"
	Green	Artillery Schools and Courses: ASC, ACS and AUC / SAUSA courses in Foligno (1960–1981); AUC courses and Army Artillery School in Bracciano (1981–2001)	

==== Engineers and Signals ====
The Engineer and Signal units of the Alpine troops carry an amaranth nappina; units that supported the 4th Alpine Army Corps directly had "CA" in white inscribed on the nappina.

Nappina	Description	Units	Italian unit name
	Amaranth, black roundel, white number	Mixed Engineer Companies of the Alpine Divisions (1935–1939) (the number corresponded with the companies number)	
	Amaranth	all units of the Alpine Engineers Corps (1939–1945): Mixed Engineer Battalions of the Alpine Divisions; Mixed Engineer, Craftsmen and Sapper Battalions; Autonomous Mixed Engineer and Sapper Companies; Engineer and Signal units of the Alpine Brigades (1949–2001): Brigade Engineer Companies (1949–2001); Brigade Signal Companies (1953–1975); Engineer and Signal Regiments: 2nd Alpine Engineer Regiment (1997–today); 2nd Alpine Signal Regiment (1997–today); 32nd Alpine Engineer Regiment (2001–today)	2° Reggimento genio guastatori alpino; 2º Reggimento trasmissioni alpino; 32° Reggimento genio guastatori alpino
	Amaranth, black roundel, white "CA"	Engineer and Signal units of the 4th Alpine Army Corps: 2nd Engineer Battalion Iseo (1976–1995); 4th Engineer Battalion Orta (1976–1992); 4th Signal Battalion Gardena (1976–1992); 7th Army Corps Signal Company (1976–1992); 1st Engineer Regiment (1992–1995); 2nd Signal Regiment (1992–1997); 2nd Engineer Regiment (1995–1997)	2º Battaglione genio guastatori "Iseo"; 4º Battaglione genio pionieri "Orta"; 4º Battaglione trasmissioni "Gardena"; 7ª Compagnia trasmissioni di C.A.; 1º Reggimento genio pionieri; 2º Reggimento trasmissioni; 2º Reggimento genio guastatori

==== Logistic Services ====
Military logistics units (Transport, Medical, Veterinary, Administrative, Commissariat and Maintenance units) carry a violet nappina; units that supported the 4th Alpine Army Corps directly had "CA" in white inscribed on the nappina.

Nappina	Description	Units	Italian unit name
	Violet	Logistic Services of the Alpine Divisions(1935–1943) Logistic Services of the Alpine Brigades (1949–2001): Brigade Logistic Services (1949-1967; Brigade Logistic Services Commands (1956–1967); Brigade Logistic Services Groups (1967–1976); Brigade Logistic Battalions (1976–2001); Taurinense Brigade air-transportable Medical Group (1976–2001); Logistic Regiments: 24th Logistic Maneuver Regiment Dolomiti (1997–2001); 24th Alpine Logistic Maneuver Regiment (2001–today); 1st Logistic Maneuver Regiment (2011–today)	Reparto sanità aviotrasportabile della Brigata alpina "Taurinense"; 24º Reggimento logistico di manovra "Dolomiti"; 24º Reggimento di manovra; 1º Reggimento di manovra
	Violet, black roundel, white "CA"	Logistic services of the 4th Alpine Army Corps: 4th Army Corps Transport Group Claudia (1976–1986); 4th Army Corps Supply and Maintenance Department (1976–1981); 4th Logistic Maneuver Battalion (1981–1986); 24th Logistic Maneuver Battalion Dolomiti (1986–1992); 24th Logistic Maneuver Regiment Dolomiti (1992–1997)	4° Autogruppo di C.A. "Claudia"; 4° Reparto RRR di C.A.; 4º Battaglione logistico di manovra; 24º Battaglione logistico di manovra "Dolomiti"; 24º Reggimento logistico di manovra "Dolomiti"

==== No longer in use ====
Nappina	Description	Units	Italian unit name
	Yellow	Regimental commands and deposits of Alpini regiments until 1934	
	Red, black roundel, yellow number	Mountain Artillery Batteries (1910–1934) (the number corresponded with a battery's number)	

=== Rank insignia ===
Officers carry the grade displaying their rank on the left side of the Cappello Alpino. Instead of the nappina, the feather is held in place by a silver or golden-coloured metal wrap. Non-commissioned officers and officers up to the rank of captain carry a brown eagle feather and officers starting with the rank of major carry a white goose feather, instead of the standard black raven feather.

Lieutenant General: three golden stars on a silver ribbon
Major General: two golden stars on a silver ribbon
Brigadier General: one golden star on a silver ribbon
Colonel Commandant: a twice as thick golden angled braid, below three standard sized golden angled braids and a red coloured outline
Colonel: a twice as thick golden angled braid and below three standard sized golden angled braids
Lieutenant Colonel: a twice as thick golden angled braid and below two standard sized golden angled braids
Major: a twice as thick golden angled braid and below one standard sized golden angled braid
Captain: three golden angled braids
Lieutenant: two golden angled braids
Second Lieutenant: one golden angled braid
Subieutenants and Sublieutenants first class: one golden angled braid with a black central stripe, and a red coloured outline and a golden star with a red coloured outline
First Marshal: one golden angled braid with a black central stripe and a red coloured outline
All other Non-commissioned officers: one golden angled braid with a black central stripe
