= Rivoli, Piedmont =

Rivoli Rìvole (Piedmontese)
- Comune
- Città di Rivoli
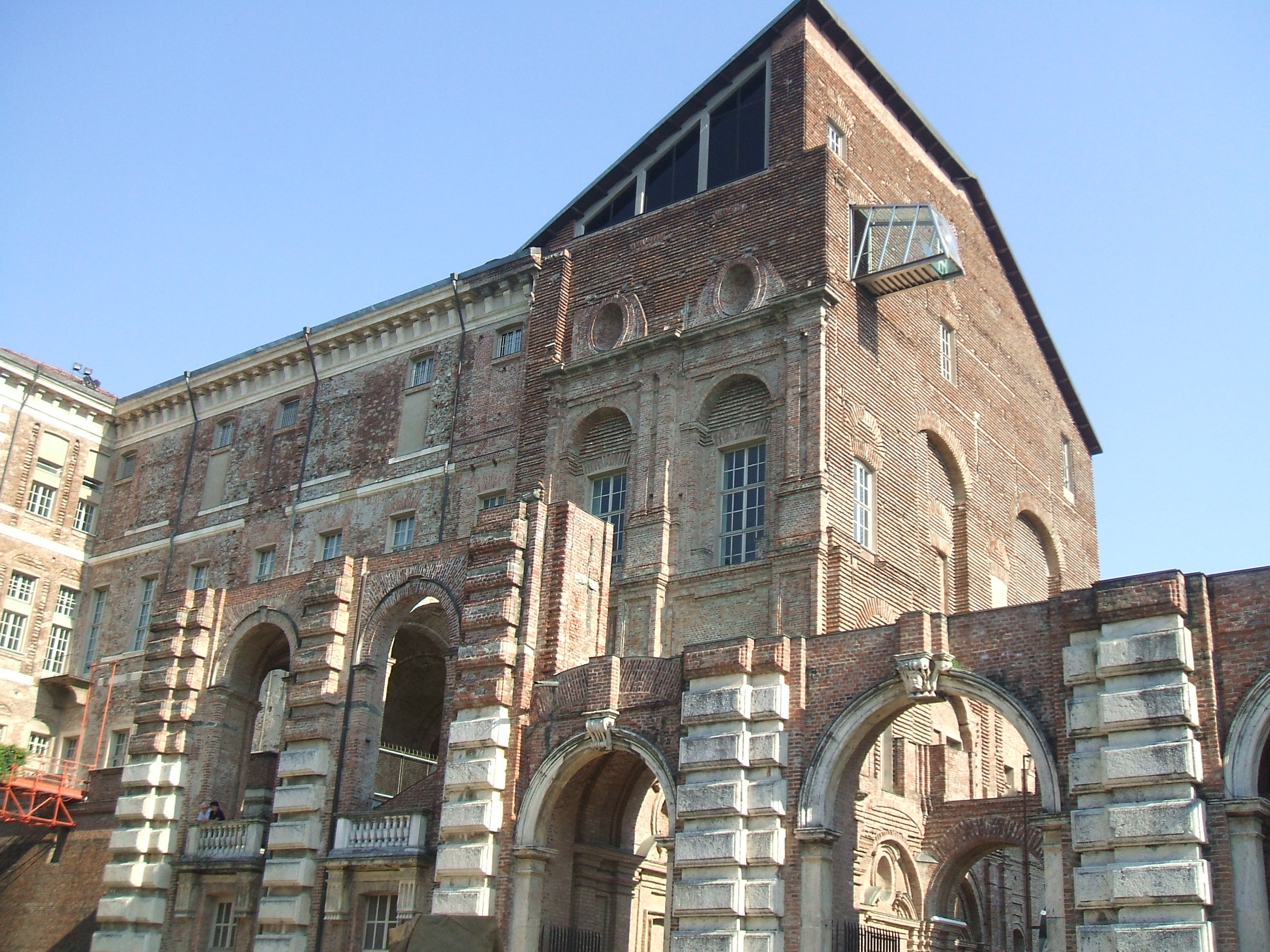
- Castle of Rivoli

- Coat of arms

- Location within Italy Location within Piedmont
- Coordinates: 45°4′N 7°31′E
- Country: Italy
- Region: Piedmont
- Metropolitan city: Turin (TO)
- Frazioni: Cascine Vica, Tetti Neirotti, Bruere

Government
  - Mayor: Franco Giusto Dessì

Area
  - Total: 29.5 km^{2} (11.4 sq mi)
- Elevation: 390 m (1,280 ft)

Population (31 December 2017)
  - Total: 48,629
  - Density: 1,650/km^{2} (4,270/sq mi)
- Demonym: Rivolesi
- Time zone: UTC+1 (CET)
  - Summer (DST): UTC+2 (CEST)
- Dialing code: 011
- Patron saint: Madonna della Stella
- Saint day: Third Monday in September
- Website: Official website

Rivoli (Italian pronunciation: [ˈriːvoli]; Piedmontese: Rìvole [ˈriʋʊle]) is a comune (municipality) established around the 1st century CE, in the Metropolitan City of Turin in the Italian region Piedmont, about 14 kilometres (9 mi) west of Turin. As of January 2017, it had a population of 48,798.

Rivoli borders the following municipalities: Turin, Pianezza, Caselette, Alpignano, Collegno, Rosta, Grugliasco, Villarbasse, Rivalta di Torino, Orbassano.

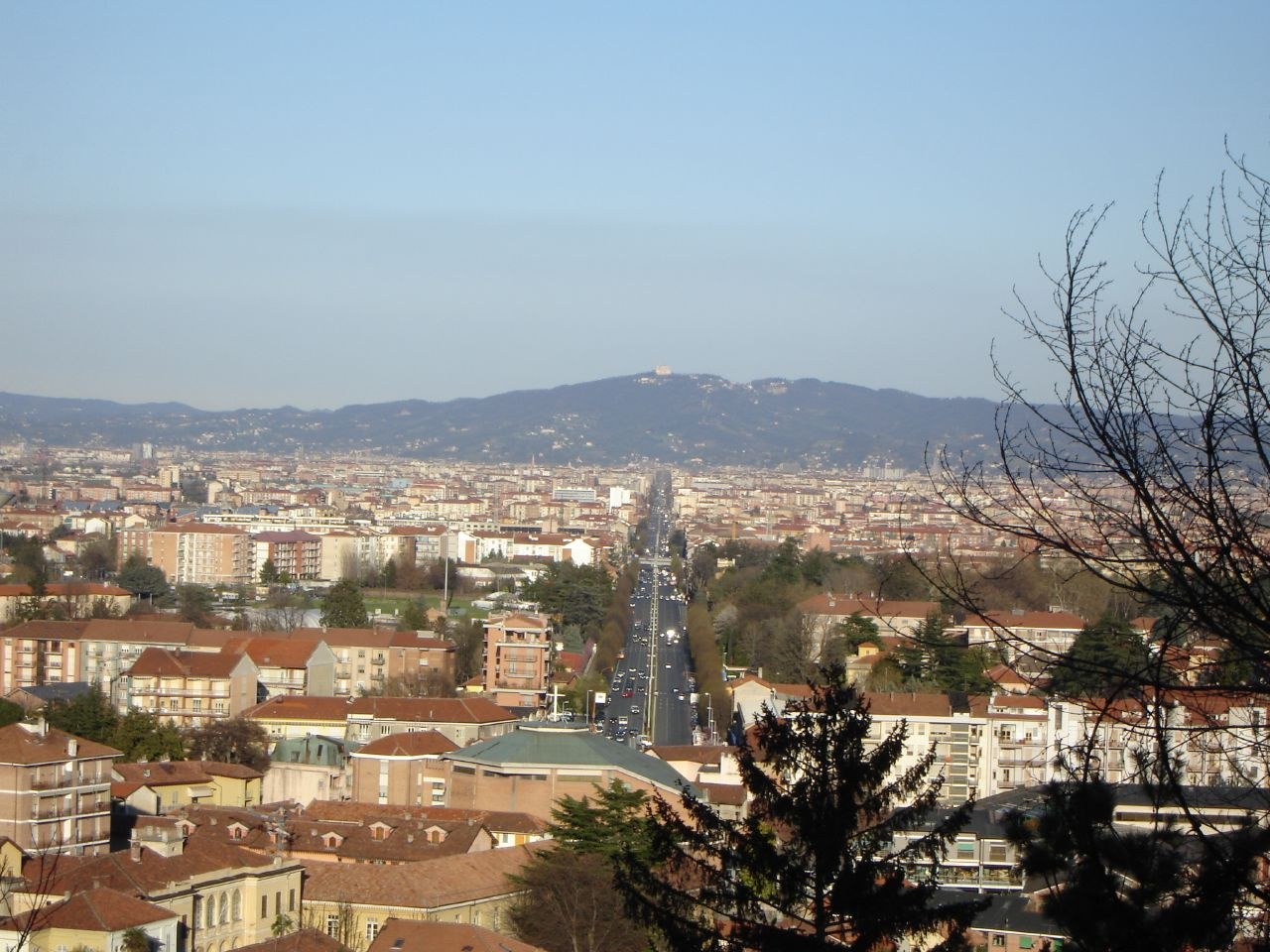
View over the town from the castle in the direction of Turin

== History ==
Although unproven by archaeological and historical sources, it is thought that before the Roman conquest the area of Rivoli was inhabited by the Taurini, a tribe of the Ligures, who, after the 4th century BC, were most likely joined by a Celtic migration from what is today southern France. The Romans conquered the area in 221 BC.

The first findings are from the 1st and 2nd centuries AD, belonging to Roman sepultures.

== Main sights ==
The Castle of Rivoli, an unfinished residence of the Royal House of Savoy, currently houses a museum of contemporary art.

Other sights include:

- 14th-century house, called Casa del Conte Verde (English: "The Green Count's house")
- Palazzo Piozzo
- Villa Colla park
- La Maison Musique, a former slaughterhouse
- Piazza Martiri, the main square and a meeting point during the winter when a skating rink is built.

== Twin towns and sister cities ==
Rivoli is twinned with:

- Mollet del Vallès, Spain
- Ravensburg, Germany
- Kranj, Slovenia
- Montélimar, France

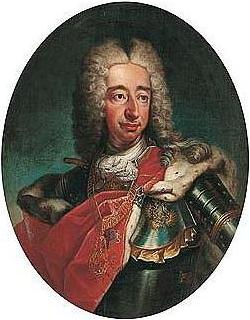
Victor Amadeus II of Sardinia

== People ==
- Anthony Neyrot (1425–1460), Catholic martyr and beatus
- Charles Emmanuel I, Duke of Savoy (1562–1630), Duke of Savoy
- Victor Amadeus II of Sardinia (1666–1732), King of Sicily and Sardinia
- Mina Leonesi (c. 1890 – c. 1930), opera singer and actress
- Rita Grande (born 1975), tennis player
- Fabio Basile (born 1994), judoka
- Lorenzo Veglia (born 1996), racing driver
- Federico Gatti (born 1998), professional football player
