= 1st Field Artillery Regiment (Mountain) =

Active Italian Army mountain artillery unit

- 1° Reggimento Artiglieria Terrestre (montagna)
- Regimental coat of arms
- Active: 1 Nov. 1887 – Oct. 1943; 1 May 1952 – today
- Country: Italy
- Branch: Italian Army
- Part of: Alpine Brigade "Taurinense"
- Garrison/HQ: Fossano
- Motto: "Nulla via invia"
- Anniversaries: 15 June 1918 – Second Battle of the Piave River
- Decorations: 1× Gold Medal of Military Valor; 1× Silver Medal of Civil Valor; 1× Italian Red Cross Bronze Medal of Merit

Insignia
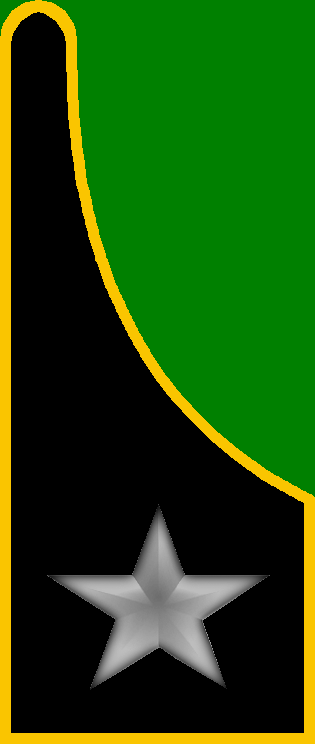
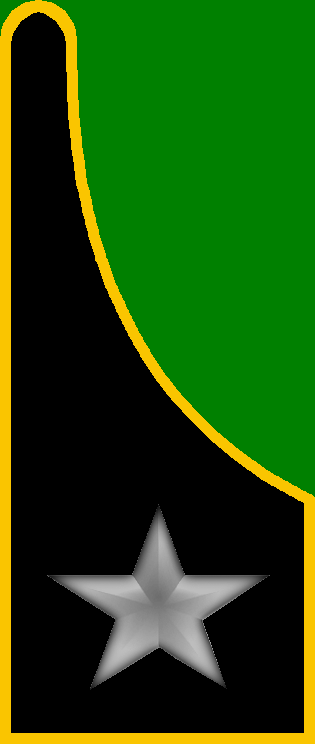
- Regimental gorget patches

The 1st Field Artillery Regiment (Mountain) (Italian: 1° Reggimento Artiglieria Terrestre (montagna)) is a field artillery regiment of the Italian Army, specializing in mountain warfare. The regiment is based in Fossano in Piedmont and assigned to the Alpine Brigade "Taurinense". The regiment is the Italian Army's senior mountain artillery regiment as it was formed in 1887 by the Royal Italian Army. In World War I the regiment's groups and batteries served on the Italian front.

In 1935 the regiment was assigned to the 1st Alpine Division "Taurinense", with which it served during World War II in the invasion of France and the Greco-Italian War. In summer 1942 the division was transferred to Montenegro, where it fought against Yugoslav partisan formation. After the announcement of the Armistice of Cassibile on 8 September 1943 the division immediately attacked German positions and by sunrise of 9 September was fully engaged in combat with German forces. The division tried to reach Kotor to be evacuated to southern Italy, but in heavy combat lost about half its strength of 14,000 men and retreated into the Montenegrin mountains. On 2 December 1943 the remnants of the division, together with the remnants of the 19th Infantry Division "Venezia", formed the Partisan Division "Garibaldi", which joined the Yugoslav National Liberation Army.

The regiment was reformed in 1952 and assigned to the Alpine Brigade "Taurinense". In 1975 the regiment was split into two mountain artillery groups and its flag and traditions were assigned to the Mountain Artillery Group "Aosta". In 1992 the regiment was reformed. The Italian mountain artillery has served since its inception alongside the infantry's Alpini speciality, with whom the mountain artillery shares the distinctive Cappello Alpino. The regimental anniversary falls, as for all Italian Army artillery regiments, on June 15, the beginning of the Second Battle of the Piave River in 1918.

== History ==
On 1 January 1883 the 16th Fortress Regiment in Mantua formed the 1st Mountain Brigade, while the 14th Fortress Regiment in Genoa formed the 2nd Mountain Brigade. The 1st Mountain Brigade consisted of the 1st Mountain Battery, which had been ceded by the 11th Fortress Regiment, the 2nd and 3rd mountain batteries, which had been ceded by the 12th Fortress Regiment, and the 4th Mountain Battery, which was formed with elements of the other three batteries. The 2nd Mountain Brigade consisted of the 5th Mountain Battery, which had been ceded by the 13th Fortress Regiment, the 6th and 7th mountain batteries of the 14th Fortress Regiment, and the 8th Mountain Battery, which was formed with elements of the other three batteries. Both brigades were based detached from their respective regiments: the 1st Mountain Brigade was based in Vicenza, while the 2nd Mountain Brigade was based in Turin. All eight batteries were equipped with the 7 BR Ret. Mont. mountain guns.

On 1 November 1887 the 14th Fortress Regiment and 16th Fortress Regiment ceded the two mountain brigades to help form the Mountain Artillery Regiment in Turin. The regiment consisted of a staff, and three brigades:

- Mountain Artillery Regiment, in Turin
  - 1st Brigade, in Conegliano
    - 1st, 2nd, 3rd, and 4th batteries
  - 2nd Brigade, in Turin
    - 5th, 6th, and 7th batteries
  - 3rd Brigade, in Turin
    - 8th and 9th batteries
  - Regimental depot, in Turin

On 1 May 1895 the 5th Field Artillery Regiment in Venaria Reale transferred its six mountain batteries to the Mountain Artillery Regiment, which proceeded to form two additional brigades and then consisted of the I and II brigades in Turin, the III Brigade in Oneglia, the IV Brigade in Mondovì, and the V Brigade in Conegliano. In 1895–96 the personnel of the regiment's 7th, 9th, 11th, and 12th batteries were sent to Eritrea, where they formed, together with local Askaris, nine mountain batteries for the First Italo-Ethiopian War. On 1 March 1896 the nine batteries fought in the disastrous Battle of Adwa. In 1897 the regiment's 8th Battery was deployed to Crete as part of the multi-national Cretan intervention of 1897–1898. In 1900, during the Boxer Rebellion in China, a section of the regiment was dispatched to Tianjin as part of the Eight-Nation Alliance intervention. In 1904 the batteries began to replace their 7 BR Ret. Mont. mountain guns with 70A mountain guns.

Like the infantry's Alpini battalions, the mountain artillery brigades recruited from the military districts located in the Alps. In 1882 the Alpini battalions were named for the cities, where the administrations of the military districts were located, from which the battalions recruited their troops. Likewise in 1901 the mountain artillery brigades were given the names of the location of their depot, respectively in the case of the brigades based in Turin, from where they recruited their troops. Afterwards the regiment consisted of the I Brigade "Oneglia", II Brigade "Mondovì", III Brigade "Torino-Susa", IV Brigade "Torino-Aosta", and V Brigade "Conegliano". On 21 August 1902 regiment's V Brigade "Conegliano" in Conegliano became an autonomous unit as and was renamed Mountain Artillery Brigade of Veneto.

On 15 July 1909 the Mountain Artillery Brigade of Veneto was used to form the 2nd Mountain Artillery Regiment. Consequently the Mountain Artillery Regiment was redesignated as 1st Mountain Artillery Regiment. On 17 July 1910 the brigades of the two regiments were redesignated as groups and dropped their numbers. Afterwards the regiment consisted of the following units:

- 1st Mountain Artillery Regiment, in Turin
  - Mountain Artillery Group "Oneglia", in Oneglia
    - 1st, 2nd, and 3rd batteries
  - Mountain Artillery Group "Mondovì", in Mondovì
    - 4th, 5th, and 6th batteries
  - Mountain Artillery Group "Torino-Susa", in Turin
    - 7th, 8th, and 9th batteries
  - Mountain Artillery Group "Torino-Aosta", in Turin
    - 10th, 11th, and 12th batteries
  - Regimental depot, in Turin

During the Italo-Turkish War in 1911–12 the regiment sent the 2nd, 5th, 7th, 9th, and 10th batteries, which were assigned to the groups "Mondovì" and "Torino-Susa" to Libya. As first unit the Group "Mondovì" disembarked in Tripoli on 21 and 22 October 1911. After the war the last units of the regiment were repatriated in November 1913. In 1913 the batteries received 65/17 mod. 13 mountain guns.

=== World War I ===
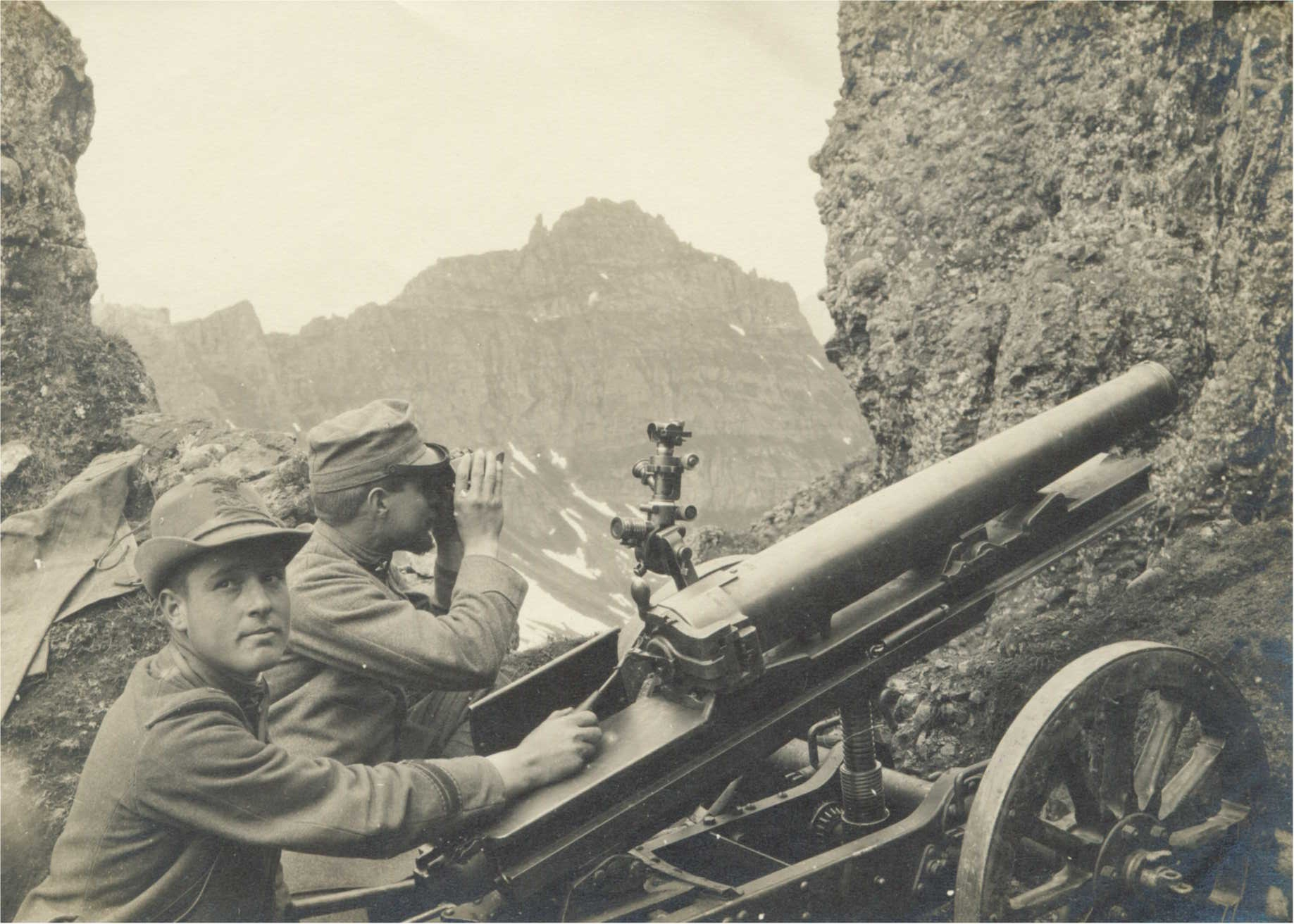
Italian mountain artillery troops firing with a 65/17 mod. 13 mountain gun from Monte Padon towards Austro-Hungarian positions on the Sass di Mezdi

On 1 February 1915 the regiment ceded the Group "Oneglia" to help form the 3rd Mountain Artillery Regiment. The 1st Mountain Artillery Regiment retained the numbers of the batteries of the Group "Oneglia" (1st, 2nd, 3rd) and the batteries of the Group "Torino-Susa" were renumbered 1st, 2nd, and 3rd. On the same date, 1 February 1915, the regiment formed the Mountain Artillery Group "Torino-Pinerolo", whose batteries received the former numbers of the batteries of the Group "Torino-Susa".

At the outbreak of World War I the regiment formed the 51st, 52nd, and 54th batteries and entered the war with the organization depicted in the following table:

1st Mountain Artillery Regiment, in Turin
Depot in Turin	Depot in Mondovì
(I) Mountain Artillery Group "Torino-Susa": 1st Mountain Artillery Battery; 2nd Mountain Artillery Battery; 3rd Mountain Artillery Battery; 51st Mountain Artillery Battery	(IV) Mountain Artillery Group "Mondovì": 10th Mountain Artillery Battery; 11th Mountain Artillery Battery; 12th Mountain Artillery Battery; 54th Mountain Artillery Battery
(II) Mountain Artillery Group "Torino-Aosta": 4th Mountain Artillery Battery; 5th Mountain Artillery Battery; 6th Mountain Artillery Battery; 52nd Mountain Artillery Battery	
(III) Mountain Artillery Group "Torino-Pinerolo": 7th Mountain Artillery Battery; 8th Mountain Artillery Battery; 9th Mountain Artillery Battery; ^{Note 1}	

Note 1: The "Torino-Pinerolo" group's 53rd Mountain Artillery Battery was not raised until November 1916 for lack of available 65/17 mod. 13 mountain guns.

During the war the regiment's depots formed the commands of the 1st, 2nd, 3rd, 4th, 5th, 9th, 10th, 11th, and 12th mountain artillery groupings and the commands of 17 mountain artillery groups: XV (66th, 67th, 68th batteries), XIX (14th, 51st, 55th batteries), XXII (47th, 48th, 49th batteries), XXV (82nd, 83rd, 84th batteries), XXIX (91st, 92nd, 93rd batteries), XXXIII, XXXIV, XXXV, XXXVII, XXXVIII, XXXIX, XLIII, XLIV, LII, LVIII, LXII, and LXV. The regiment's depots also formed 37 mountain artillery batteries, two commands of siege groups and 14 siege batteries.

During the war the regiment was broken up and its groups and batteries attached to different Alpini units. The Mountain Artillery Group "Torino-Susa" fought in 1915 and 1916 on the Col di Lana and on Monte Sief. In 1917 the group was deployed in Lig and Bodrež, then fought on Monte Zebio, on the Banjšice plateau, on Monte Spinoncia and on Monte Asolone. In 1918 the group was in combat on Monte Spinoncia, Monte Solarolo, on the Vedetta dell'Archeson and finally in the Conca di Schiavino.

The Mountain Artillery Group "Torino-Aosta" was deployed in 1915 in the Valsugana and in 1916 on Monte Cauriol, on the Punta Cardinal and on Cima Busa Alta in the Lagorai range. In 1917 the group was deployed on the Colle dell’Orso, Monte Solarolo and Monte Spinoncia. In 1918 the group fought in the battles of Monte Grappa.

The Mountain Artillery Group "Torino-Pinerolo" fought in 1915 on Krn, and Monte Javorcek. In 1916 the group fought on Monte Pasubio and on Monte Corno. In 1917 the group returned to Monte Pasubio and in 1918 the group was on Monte Valderoa, on Monte Spinoncia, and after the successful Battle of Vittorio Veneto advanced to the city of Feltre.

The Mountain Artillery Group "Mondovì" was in 1915–16 deployed on the Monte Mrzli and Monte Sleme. In 1917 the group fought on Monte Kuk, Monte Vodice and then one the Banjšice plateau. In 1918 the group was in the Tonale Pass sector.

In July 1918 the regiment formed an artillery section of 116 men, two horses, twelve mules, and two 65/17 mod. 13 mountain guns. The section was assigned to the Italian Expedition in the Far East Siberian, which was part of the Entente powers Siberian intervention against Soviet forces in the Russian Civil War.

=== Interwar years ===
In 1920 the regiment moved from Turin to Cuneo and was reduced to the groups "Torino-Susa", "Torino-Pinerolo" and "Mondovì", each with three batteries with 75/13 mod. 15 mountain guns. On 21 February 1921 the mountain groups lost their names and the regiment consisted of the I, II, and III groups. In 1923 the regiment returned to Turin and on 1 July of the same year the regiment formed the IV Group with 100/17 mod. 14 howitzers.

On 11 March 1926 the Royal Italian Army reorganized its artillery. As Alpini units were traditionally numbered from West to East the army decided that the 2nd Mountain Artillery Regiment and 3rd Mountain Artillery Regiment should swap numbers. Furthermore the army decided that mountain artillery groups should again be named and not numbered and that the groups with 100/17 mod. 14 howitzers should be transferred to the field artillery. Consequently the 1st Mountain Artillery Regiment transferred its IV Group with 100/17 mod. 14 howitzers to the 28th Field Artillery Regiment. In the course of the year the regiment received the I Group of the former 3rd Mountain Artillery Regiment. This group, which was based in Ivrea, was renamed Mountain Artillery Group "Aosta". After the reform the 1st Mountain Artillery Regiment consisted of the Mountain Artillery Group "Susa", with the 1st, 2nd, and 3rd batteries, the Mountain Artillery Group "Aosta", with the 4th, 5th, and 6th batteries, the Mountain Artillery Group "Pinerolo", with the 7th, 8th, and 9th batteries, and the Mountain Artillery Group "Mondovì", with the 10th, 11th, and 12th batteries. The regiment was assigned to the I Alpine Brigade, which also included the 1st Alpini Regiment, 2nd Alpini Regiment, 3rd Alpini Regiment, and 4th Alpini Regiment.

On 1 December 1929 the Group "Aosta" was transferred to the 2nd Mountain Artillery Regiment. On 19 October 1933 the I Alpine Brigade was split to form the IV Alpine Brigade, which received the 1st Alpini Regiment and 2nd Alpini Regiment. On 1 January 1934 the 1st Mountain Artillery Regiment ceded the groups "Pinerolo" and "Mondovì" to help form the 4th Mountain Artillery Regiment for the new brigade. On the same date the Group "Aosta" returned from the 2nd Mountain Artillery Regiment.

On 27 October 1934 the I Alpine Brigade changed its name to I Superior Alpine Command and the regiment was renamed 1st Alpine Artillery Regiment. In December of the same year the command was given the name "Taurinense". On 10 September 1935 the I Superior Alpine Command "Taurinense" was renamed 1st Alpine Division "Taurinense" and consequently the regiment was renamed 1st Alpine Artillery Regiment "Taurinense".

In June 1935 the Alpine Artillery Group "Susa" was mobilized in preparation for the Second Italo-Ethiopian War. The group, with the 2nd, 3rd, and 40th batteries, was attached to the 16th Artillery Regiment "Sabauda" for the war. On 31 December 1935 the 2nd Alpine Artillery Regiment "Tridentina" formed the 5th Alpine Artillery Regiment "Pusteria", which consisted of the Alpine Artillery Group "Belluno", which had been ceded by the 3rd Alpine Artillery Regiment "Julia", and the Alpine Artillery Group "Lanzo", which had been formed by the depot of the 1st Alpine Artillery Regiment "Taurinense". To ready the new regiment quickly for the war the other alpine artillery regiments transferred existing batteries temporarily to the new regiment. In case of the 1st Alpine Artillery Regiment "Taurinense" the 1st Battery of the Group "Susa" was transferred to the Group "Belluno", while the 5th Battery of the Group "Aosta" was transferred to the Group "Lanzo". As replacement the regiment formed the 53rd Battery for the Group "Aosta". All the units returned to the regiment after the war: the Group "Susa" in January 1937 and the 1st and 5th batteries in April of the same year.

=== World War II ===
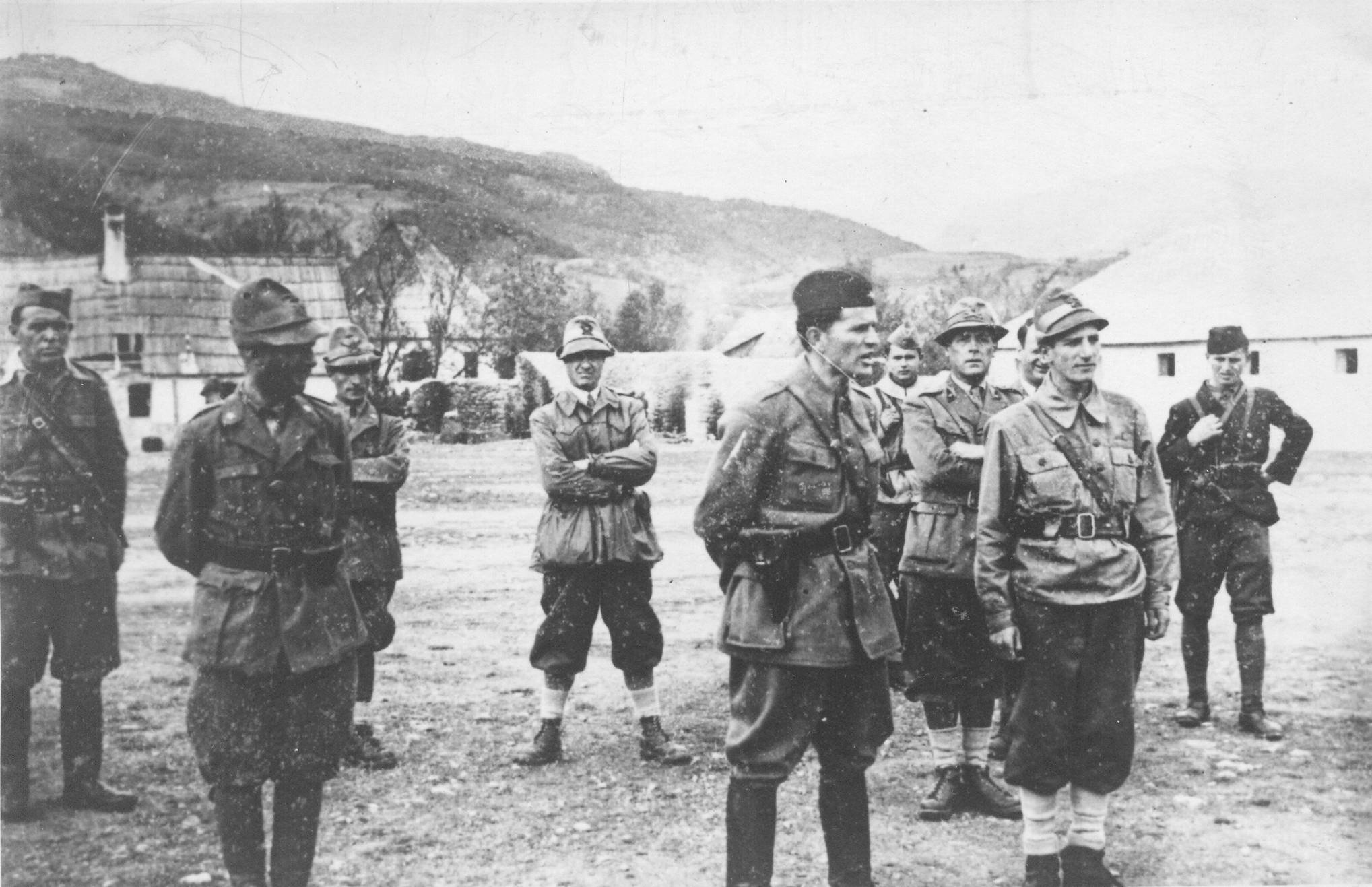
2nd Yugoslav Partisan Corps Commander Peko Dapčević addressing the men of the Alpine Artillery Group "Aosta" in September 1943

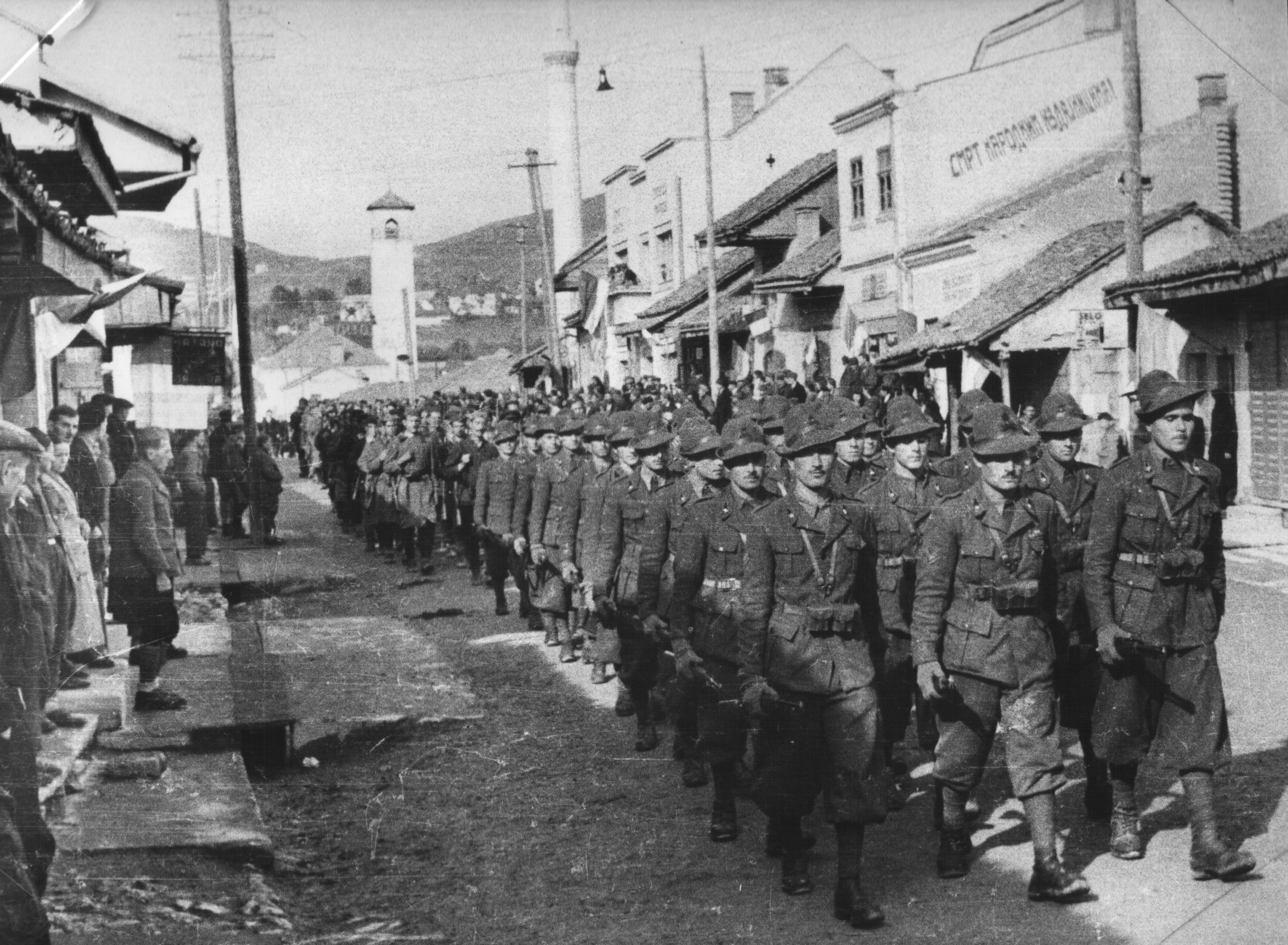
Alpini of the "Taurinense" in Pljevlja October 1943

In August 1939 the regiment mobilized the Alpine Artillery Group "Val Chisone" (47th, 48th, 49th, and 50th batteries) and Alpine Artillery Group "Val d'Orco" (51st and 52nd batteries). The two groups supported the alpini groups, which were manned with reservists. On 10 June 1940, the day Italy entered World War II, the regiment consisted of a command, command unit, the Alpine Artillery Group "Susa" (1st, 2nd, 3rd, and 40th batteries), and the Alpine Artillery Group "Aosta" (4th, 5th, 6th, and 53rd batteries). The regiment was assigned, together with the 3rd Alpini Regiment and 4th Alpini Regiment, to the 1st Alpine Division "Taurinense". In June 1940 the division participated in the invasion of France in the Little St Bernard Pass sector. On 31 October 1940 the 53rd Battery was disbanded and reformed in November 1941 for the Group "Val d'Orco". On 15 November 1941 the depot of the regiment formed the 6th Alpine Artillery Regiment, which received the groups "Val Chisone" and "Val d'Orco", and the Alpine Artillery Group "Val d'Adige", which had been formed by the depot of the 2nd Alpine Artillery Regiment "Tridentina".

In January 1942 the 1st Alpine Division "Taurinense" was sent to occupied Yugoslavia, where it participated in the third Axis anti-Partisan offensive. In August 1942 the division moved to Montenegro, where a year later it took part in the fifth Axis anti-Partisan offensive. After the announcement of the Armistice of Cassibile on 8 September 1943 most of the division immediately attacked German positions and by sunrise of 9 September was fully engaged in combat with German forces. The division tried to reach Kotor to be evacuated, but in heavy combat lost about half its strength of 14,000 men. The Group "Aosta", Alpini Battalion "Ivrea", and the 40th Battery of the Group "Susa" had ignored orders to move to Kotor and sided with Tito's Yugoslav National Liberation Army forces right away. By early October the remnants of the division, together with the troops of the 19th Infantry Division "Venezia", retreated towards Pljevlja.

On 2 December 1943 in Pljevlja the remaining Italian soldiers, approximately 16,000 men, were grouped together in the Division "Garibaldi". Integrated into the Partisan 2nd Corps the division fought in Montenegro, Herzegovina, Bosnia, and Sandžak until February 1945, when the last troops were repatriated via the liberated harbour of Dubrovnik.

For its conduct, loyalty and bravery in Montenegro after 8 September 1943 the Alpine Artillery Group "Aosta" was awarded Italy's highest military honor the Gold Medal of Military Valor — the only artillery group of the Italian Army to be such honored. The Gold Medal was affixed to the flag of the 1st Mountain Artillery Regiment and is depicted on the regiment's coat of arms.

=== Cold War ===
On 15 May 1951 the Mountain Artillery Group "Aosta" was reformed in Saluzzo and equipped with 75/13 mod. 15 mountain guns. On the same day the Mountain Artillery Group "Susa" was reformed in Rivoli and equipped with 100/17 mod. 14 howitzers. Both groups were assigned to the I Territorial Military Command in Turin until 15 April 1952, as on that date the two groups entered the newly formed Alpine Brigade "Taurinense". On 1 May 1952 the Mountain Artillery Group "Pinerolo" was reformed in Susa and equipped with M30 107mm mortars. The same day, 1 May 1952, the three groups, and a light anti-aircraft group with 40/56 anti-aircraft autocannons in Rivoli, entered the reformed 1st Mountain Artillery Regiment. The regiment was based in Rivoli and assigned to the [Alpine Brigade "Taurinense". In the course of the year 1952 the Group "Susa" moved from Rivoli to Susa.

Initially only the Group "Aosta" consisted of batteries with traditional mountain battery numbers, but on 15 March 1955 the army's General Staff ordered that also the groups with 100/17 mod. 14 howitzers and M30 107mm mortars should receive traditional mountain battery numbers. Consequently all the batteries of the regiment were renumbered and afterwards the regiment consisted of the following groups and batteries:

- 1st Mountain Artillery Regiment, in Rivoli
  - Command Unit
  - Mountain Artillery Group "Aosta", in Saluzzo
    - Command Unit
    - 4th, 5th, and 6th batteries with 75/13 mod. 15 mountain guns
  - Mountain Artillery Group "Susa", in Susa
    - Command Unit
    - 1st and 2nd batteries with 100/17 mod. 14 howitzers
  - Mountain Artillery Group "Pinerolo", in Susa
    - Command Unit
    - 7th, 8th, and 9th batteries with M30 107mm mortars
  - Light Anti-aircraft Group, in Rivoli
    - Command Unit
    - 1st, 2nd, and 3rd batteries with 40/56 anti-aircraft autocannons

On 1 January 1956 the Light Anti-aircraft Group was transferred to the 1st Heavy Anti-aircraft Artillery Regiment. The same year the regiment formed the 3rd Battery for the Group "Susa". On 1 January 1958 the regiment formed a Light Aircraft Section with L-21B artillery observation planes, which in the course of the year was transferred to the brigade command. On 1 April of the same year the Group "Pinerolo" was equipped with Brandt AM-50 120mm mortars. In 1959 the regiment received 105/14 mod. 56 pack howitzers and one year later each of the regiment's three groups fielded two howitzer and one mortar battery. Afterwards the regiment consisted of the following units:

Location of the regiment and its groups in Piedmont at the end of 1962
- 1st Mountain Artillery Regiment, in Rivoli
  - Command Unit
  - Mountain Artillery Group "Susa", in Susa
    - Command Unit
    - 1st Battery, with 105/14 mod. 56 pack howitzers
    - 2nd Battery, with 105/14 mod. 56 pack howitzers
    - 3rd Battery, with Brandt AM-50 120mm mortars
  - Mountain Artillery Group "Aosta", in Saluzzo
    - Command Unit
    - 4th Battery, with 105/14 mod. 56 pack howitzers
    - 5th Battery, with 105/14 mod. 56 pack howitzers
    - 6th Battery, with Brandt AM-50 120mm mortars
  - Mountain Artillery Group "Pinerolo", in Susa
    - Command Unit
    - 7th Battery, with 105/14 mod. 56 pack howitzers
    - 8th Battery, with 105/14 mod. 56 pack howitzers
    - 9th Battery, with Brandt AM-50 120mm mortars

During the Cold War the Alpine Brigade "Julia" was tasked with defending the Canal Valley, which was considered to be the most likely invasion route for a Warsaw Pact attack on Italy. To augment the Alpine Brigade "Julia" the Group "Pinerolo" moved on 1 December 1963 from Susa to Tolmezzo, where it was assigned to 3rd Mountain Artillery Regiment. Although now stationed in Friuli-Venezia Giulia the group retained its traditional recruiting area in Piedmont. As replacement the 1st Mountain Artillery Regiment reformed on 1 January 1965 the Mountain Artillery Group "Mondovì" in Susa as a reserve formation. On 15 April 1970 the Group "Mondovì" became an active unit with the batteries 10th, 11th, and 12th. In 1970 all the mountain groups' mortar batteries were equipped with 105/14 mod. 56 pack howitzers. On 31 December 1974 the Group "Pinerolo" was placed in reserve status.

During the 1975 army reform the army disbanded the regimental level and newly independent battalions and groups were granted for the first time their own flags. On 1 June 1975 the Group "Pinerolo" was disbanded, followed by the Group "Mondovì" on 10 September. On 1 October the Group "Susa" was renamed Mountain Artillery Group "Pinerolo". On 18 October 1975 the 1st Mountain Artillery Regiment was disbanded and the next day the two remaining groups became autonomous units and were assigned to the Alpine Brigade "Taurinense". Both groups consisted of a command, a command and services battery, and three batteries with 105/14 mod. 56 pack howitzers, with one of the batteries being mule-carried. At the time each of the two groups fielded 610 men (35 officers, 55 non-commissioned officers, and 520 soldiers).

On 12 November 1976 the President of the Italian Republic Giovanni Leone issued decree 846, which assigned the flag and traditions of the 1st Mountain Artillery Regiment to the Mountain Artillery Group "Aosta" and the flag and traditions of the 4th Mountain Artillery Regiment to the Mountain Artillery Group "Pinerolo".

On 15 June 1976 the Mountain Artillery Group "Pinerolo" renumbered the batteries it had inherited from the Group "Susa" and then consisted of the batteries 7th, 8th, and 40th, which were all equipped with 105/14 mod. 56 pack howitzers, with the 7th Battery being mule-carried. On 13 November 1981 the Mountain Artillery Group "Aosta" was equipped with M114 155mm howitzers. In 1987 the Mountain Artillery Group "Pinerolo" formed a Self-defense Anti-aircraft Battery, which was equipped with Stinger man-portable air-defense systems.

=== Recent times ===
After the end of the Cold War the Italian Army began to draw down its forces. On 23 March 1991 the 7th Battery, 8th Battery and the Command and Services Battery of the Mountain Artillery Group "Pinerolo" were disbanded, while the 40th Battery and the Self-defense Anti-aircraft Battery were transferred to the Mountain Artillery Group "Aosta", which disbanded its own 6th Battery. On 14 September of the same year the Mountain Artillery Group "Aosta", and the two batteries of the Mountain Artillery Group "Pinerolo", moved from Saluzzo respectively from Susa to Fossano, where they formed the Mountain Artillery Regiment "Aosta". The regiment was equipped with 105/14 mod. 56 pack howitzers and one year later, on 19 September 1992, the regiment was renamed 1st Mountain Artillery Regiment. The regiment consisted now of the following units:

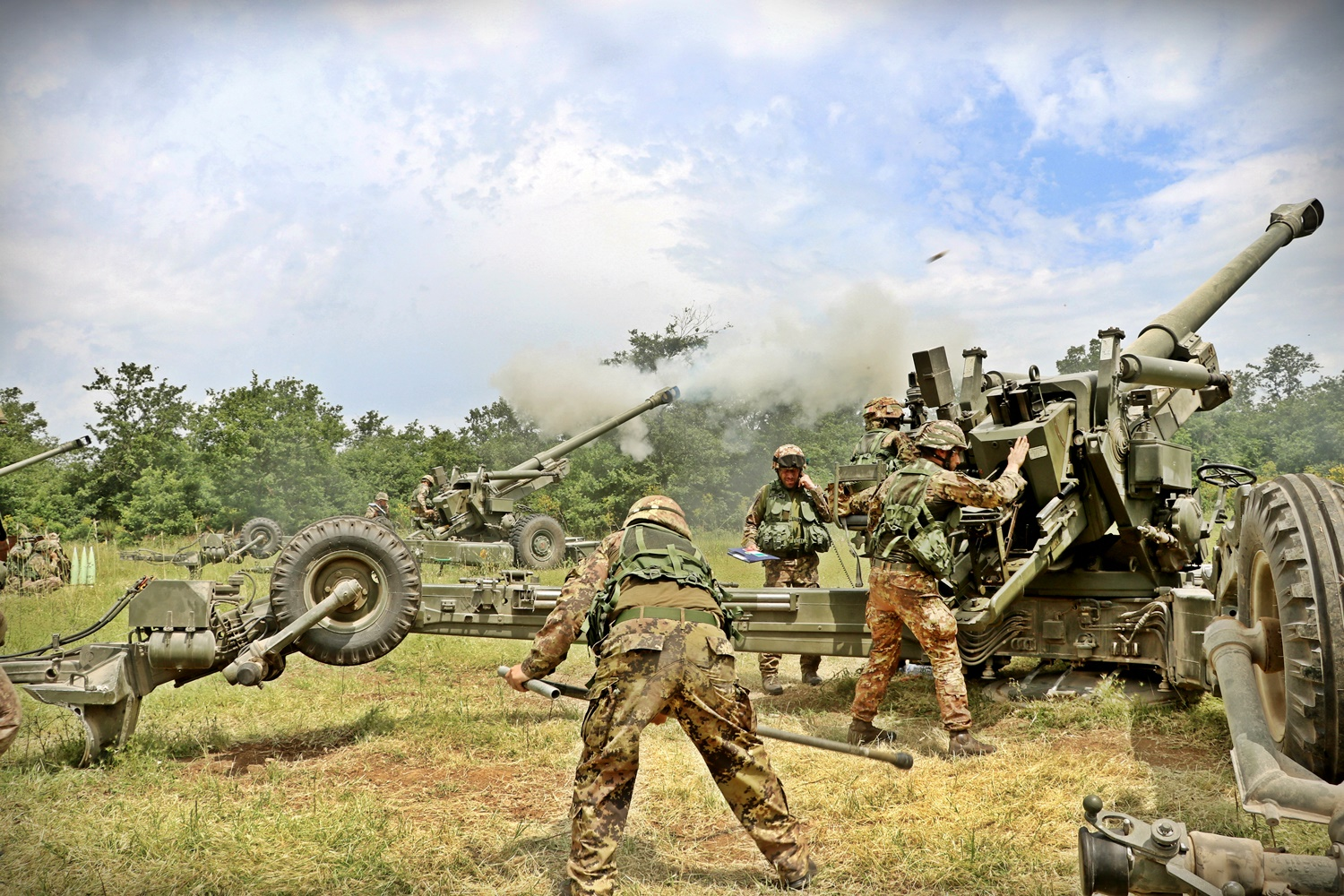
1st Field Artillery Regiment (Mountain) on exercise with a FH-70 155mm howitzer

- 1st Mountain Artillery Regiment, in Fossano
  - Command and Services Battery
  - Self-defense Anti-aircraft Battery, with Stinger man-portable air-defense systems
  - Group "Aosta"
    - 4th Battery, with 105/14 mod. 56 pack howitzers
    - 5th Battery, with 105/14 mod. 56 pack howitzers
    - 40th Battery, with 105/14 mod. 56 pack howitzers

On 30 November 2001 the regiment was renamed 1st Field Artillery Regiment (Mountain). The same year the regiment disbanded the Self-defense Anti-aircraft Battery and reformed the 6th and 7th batteries: the 6th as the regiment's Fire and Technical Support Battery, while the 7th became the regiment's Surveillance, Target Acquisition and Tactical Liaison Battery. At the same time the regiment was equipped with FH-70 155mm howitzers.

== Organization ==
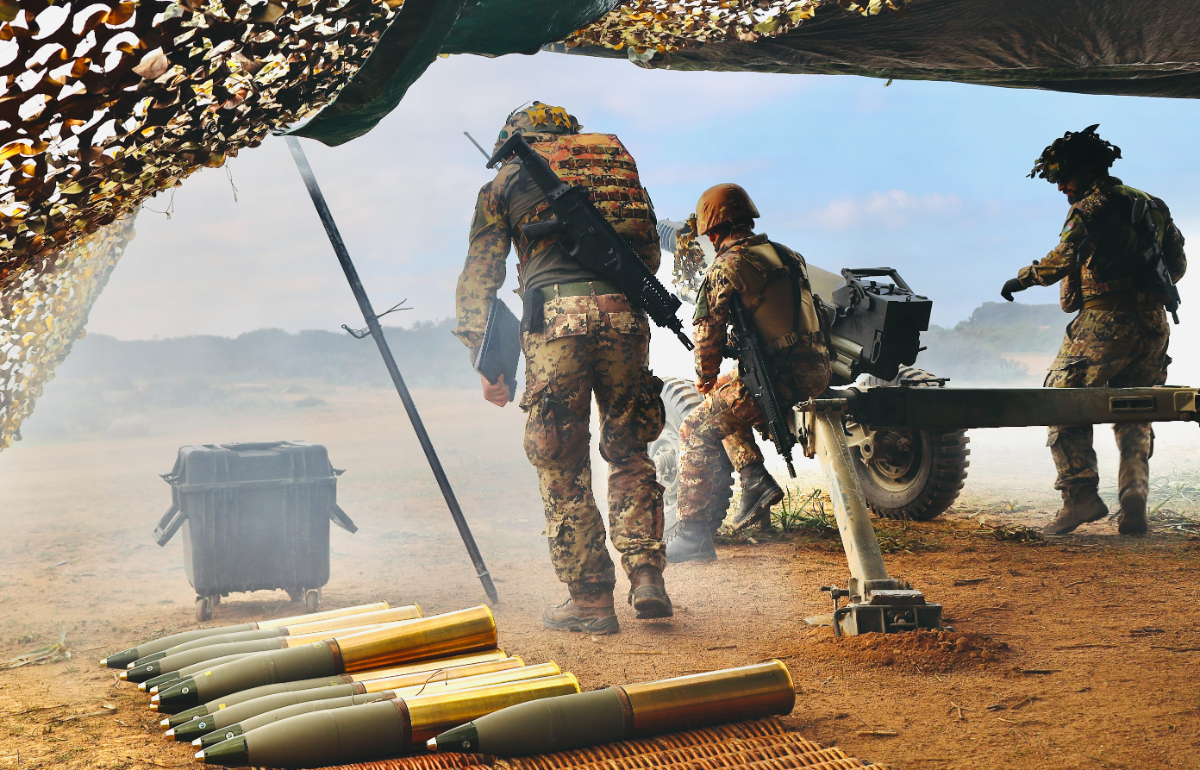
The regiment's 40th Battery with a 105/14 mod. 56 pack howitzer during the Teulada 2025 exercise

As of 2025 the 1st Field Artillery Regiment (Mountain) is organized as follows:

- 1st Field Artillery Regiment (Mountain), in Fossano
  - Command and Logistic Support Battery
  - 7th Surveillance, Target Acquisition and Tactical Liaison Battery
  - Group "Aosta"
    - 4th Howitzer Battery
    - 5th Howitzer Battery
    - 40th Howitzer Battery
    - 6th Fire and Technical Support Battery

The regiment is equipped with FH-70 155mm howitzers, 105/14 mod. 56 pack howitzers and 120 mm mortars.

== See also ==
- Alpine Brigade "Taurinense"
