= 4th Alpini Paratroopers Regiment =

Active Italian Army mountain paratroopers unit

- 4° Reggimento Alpini Paracadutisti
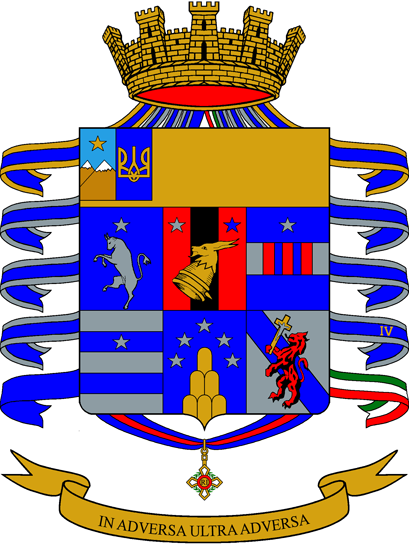
- Regimental coat of arms
- Active: 1 Nov. 1882 – 8 Sept. 1943; 15 April 1946 – 2001; 25 Sept. 2004 – today
- Country: Italy
- Branch: Italian Army
- Type: Special forces
- Part of: Army Special Forces Command
- Garrison/HQ: Montorio Veronese
- Motto: "In adversa ultra adversa"
- Anniversaries: 18 May 1917
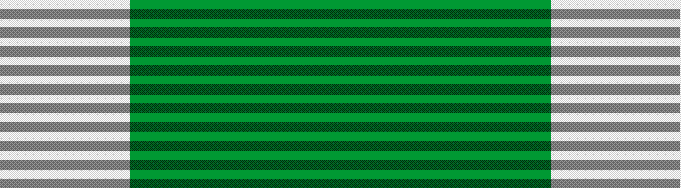
- Decorations: 2× Military Order of Italy; 2× Gold Medals of Military Valor; 9× Silver Medals of Military Valor; 1× Bronze Medal of Military Valor; 1× Silver Medal of Civil Valor; 1× Silver Medal of Merit

Insignia
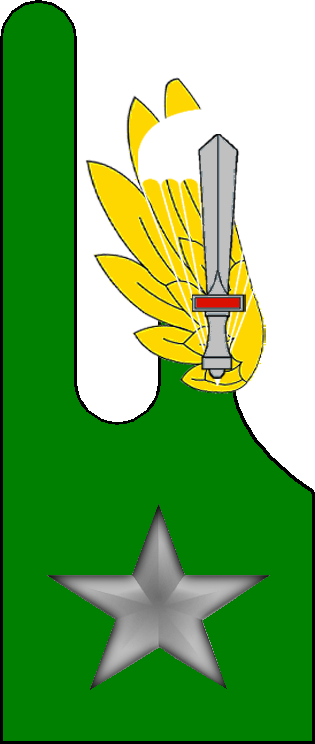
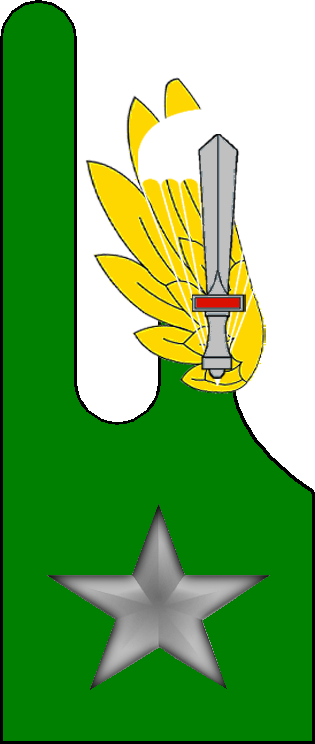
- 4th Alpini Paratroopers Regiment gorget patches

The 4th Alpini Paratroopers Regiment (Italian: 4° Reggimento Alpini Paracadutisti) is a special operations forces regiment of the Italian Army based in Montorio Veronese in Veneto. Originally the regiment belonged to the Italian Army's Alpini infantry specialty, but since 14 July 1996 its personnel also belongs to the Paratroopers infantry specialty. On 1 November 1882, the Royal Italian Army formed the 4th Alpini Regiment, which had its recruiting area in the Graian Alps and Pennine Alps. Since 2013 the regiment is assigned to the Army Special Forces Command. The regiment is one of the most often and one of the highest decorated regiments of the Italian Army, although its two Gold Medals of Military Valor were awarded to the regiment's currently inactive Alpini Battalion "Aosta", respectively the currently active Battalion "Monte Cervino".

During World War I the regiment expanded to ten battalions, which fought separately in the alpine areas of the Italian front. For its conduct and bravery during the war the Alpini Battalion "Aosta" was awarded a Gold Medal of Military Valor, making it the only Alpini unit to be awarded Italy's highest military honor in the war. In 1935 the regiment was assigned to the 1st Alpine Division "Taurinense", with which it served during World War II in the invasion of France. In winter 1942–43, the Skiers Battalion "Monte Cervino", which had been reformed by the 4th Alpini Regiment in October 1941, was destroyed on the Eastern Front during the Red Army's Operation Little Saturn. For its conduct, bravery and sacrifice in the Soviet Union between February 1942 and February 1943 the Skiers Battalion "Monte Cervino" was awarded a Gold Medal of Military Valor. In 1942 the division was transferred to Montenegro, where it served on occupation duty until the announcement of the Armistice of Cassibile on 8 September 1943. Following the announcement the division instantly began to fight German forces. By early October the remnants of the division and of its regiments were forced to surrender to the Germans. With Alpini, who had escaped from Montenegro, the Italian Co-Belligerent Army formed in fall 1943, the Alpini Battalion "Piemonte", which fought on the allied side in the Italian campaign. From June to September 1944, the Alpini Battalion "Piemonte" was assigned to the reformed 3rd Alpini Regiment. On 30 September 1944, the 3rd Alpini Regiment was disbanded and the Alpini Battalion "Piemonte" was assigned to the Special Infantry Regiment "Legnano" of the Combat Group "Legnano".

On 15 April 1946, the 4th Alpini Regiment was reformed and in 1952 assigned to the Alpine Brigade "Taurinense". In 1975 the regiment was disbanded and its flag and traditions assigned to the Alpini Battalion "Aosta", which was assigned to the Alpine Military School. In 1989, the battalion was reorganized and renamed Tactical Logistic Support Battalion "Aosta". In 1998, battalion merged with the Alpine Military School's Complement Officer Cadets Battalion and was renamed Training Battalion "Aosta". In 2001, the Training Battalion "Aosta" was reduced to Training Unit "Aosta" and the flag of the 4th Alpini Regiment transferred to the Shrine of the Flags in the Vittoriano in Rome. On 24 September 2004, the Alpini Paratroopers Battalion "Monte Cervino" lost its autonomy and the next day the battalion entered the 4th Alpini Paratroopers Regiment, which inherited the flag, traditions, honors and coat of arms of the 4th Alpini Regiment. Since 2013, the regiment is assigned to the Army Special Forces Command. The regiment's anniversary falls on 18 May 1917, the day the regiment's Alpini Battalion "Aosta" stormed and held the summit of Monte Vodice during the Tenth Battle of the Isonzo.

== History ==
On 15 October 1872, the Royal Italian Army formed 15 locally recruited Alpini companies in the alpine regions of Northern Italy. Nine more companies were formed the following year. In 1875 the 24 companies were organized into seven battalions, and in 1878 the companies were increased to 36 and the battalions to ten. On 1 November 1882, the Alpini companies were increased to 72 and grouped into 20 battalions. On the same date the battalions were assigned to six newly formed Alpini regiments, which were numbered 1st to 6th from West to East, while companies were numbered from 1 to 72 from to West to East. Upon entering the regiments, the battalions, which until then had been designated by a Roman numeral, were named for their recruiting zone, while the Alpini companies were renumbered sequentially from 1st to 72nd. One of the six Alpini regiments formed on 1 November 1882 was the 4th Alpini Regiment, which was formed in Turin in Piedmont. The new regiment received the Battalion "Val Pellice", which recruited in the Pellice Valley, the Battalion "Val Chisone", which recruited in the Chisone Valley, and the Battalion "Val Brenta", which was recruited in the Brenta valley in Veneto.

- 4th Alpini Regiment, in Turin
  - Battalion "Val Pellice", in Pinerolo
    - 24th, 25th, 26th, and 27th Company
  - Battalion "Val Chisone", in Fenestrelle
    - 28th, 29th, 30th, and 31st Company
  - Battalion "Val Brenta", in Bassano
    - 62nd, 63rd, and 64th Company

On 1 April 1885, the regiment transferred the Battalion "Val Chisone" to the 3rd Alpini Regiment, and the Battalion "Val Brenta" to the 6th Alpini Regiment. In turn the regiment received from the 6th Alpini Regiment the battalion "Val d'Orco" and "Val d'Aosta". The Battalion "Val d'Orco" recruited in the Orco Valley, while the Battalion "Val d'Aosta" recruited in the Aosta Valley.

In 1886 the regiment moved from Turin to Ivrea and on 1 November of the same year, the battalions changed their names from their recruiting zones to the cities and towns, where their base was located. At the same time Alpini soldiers and non-commissioned officers were issued thread tufts, called Nappina in Italian, which were clipped to the Cappello Alpino headdress, and colored white for the troops of a regiment's first battalion, red for the troops of a regiment's second battalion, green for the troops of a regiment's third battalion, and blue for the troops of a regiment's fourth battalion. The 4th Alpini Regiment consisted afterwards of the following units:

- 4th Alpini Regiment, in Ivrea
  - Alpini Battalion "Pinerolo", in Pinerolo (former Battalion "Val Pellice")
    - 24th, 25th, 26th, and 27th Alpini Company
  - Alpini Battalion "Ivrea", in Ivrea (former Battalion "Val d'Orco")
    - 37th, 38th, 39th, and 40th Alpini Company
  - Alpini Battalion "Aosta", in Aosta (former Battalion "Val d'Aosta")
    - 7th, 41st, 42nd, and 43rd Alpini Company

On 1 October 1888, the Alpini Battalion "Pinerolo" was transferred to the 3rd Alpini Regiment, which in turn ceded its Alpini Battalion "Susa 2°" in Susa to the 4th Alpini Regiment. On 1 February 1889, the Alpini Battalion "Susa 2°" was renamed Alpini Battalion "Susa". In 1895–96 the regiment provided 14 officers and 512 troops to help form the I and II provisional Alpini battalions, which were deployed to Eritrea for the First Italo-Ethiopian War. In 1901 the regiment was assigned together with the 3rd Alpini Regiment and 5th Alpini Regiment to the II Alpini Group, which on 9 August 1910 was renamed II Alpine Brigade. In 1908 the Alpini Battalion "Susa" returned to the 3rd Alpini Regiment, and the 4th Alpini Regiment formed a new battalion, which received the 7th Alpini Company of the Alpini Battalion "Aosta", the 24th Alpini Company of the Alpini Battalion "Pinerolo", and the 37th Alpini Company of the Alpini Battalion "Ivrea". The new battalion was initially based in Pallanza and therefore named Alpini Battalion "Pallanza", but soon the battalion moved from Pallanza to Intra and was renamed Alpini Battalion "Intra". The 4th Alpini Regiment consisted now of the following battalions:

- 4th Alpini Regiment, in Ivrea
  - Alpini Battalion "Ivrea", in Ivrea
    - 38th, 39th, and 40th Alpini Company
  - Alpini Battalion "Aosta", in Aosta
    - 41st, 42nd, and 43rd Alpini Company
  - Alpini Battalion "Intra", in Intra
    - 7th, 24th, and 37th Alpini Company

In December 1908 the regiment was deployed to the area of the Strait of Messina for the recovery efforts after the 1908 Messina earthquake. For its service the regiment was awarded a Silver Medal of Merit, which was affixed to the regiment's flag. On 29 September 1911 the Kingdom of Italy declared war against the Ottoman Empire and the regimental command of the 4th Alpini Regiment along with the Alpini Battalion "Ivrea" deployed to Libya for the Italo-Turkish War.

=== World War I ===
At the outbreak of World War I the Alpini speciality consisted of eight regiments, which fielded 26 battalions with 79 companies. Each Alpini battalion, with the exception of the Alpini Battalion "Verona", fielded three Alpini companies, while the Alpini Battalion "Verona" fielded four companies. Each company consisted of one captain, four lieutenants and 250 other ranks. After Italy's initial declaration of neutrality 38 additional Alpini companies were formed during the autumn of 1914 with men, who had completed their military service in the preceding four years. These companies were numbered from 80th to 117th and assigned to the existing Alpini battalions. In January 1915, each Alpini battalion formed a reserve battalion, with men, who had completed their military service at least four years, but not more than eleven years prior. These reserve battalions were named for a valley (Italian: Valle; abbreviated Val) located near their associated regular Alpini battalion's base, and the reserve battalions received the same Nappina as their associated regular Alpini battalion. The companies of the Valle battalions were numbered from 201st to 281st, with the numbers 227th, 233rd, 237th, 271st, and 273rd unused.

On 23 May 1915, Italy declared war on Austria-Hungary and at the time the 4th Alpini Regiment consisted of the following units:

- 4th Alpini Regiment, in Ivrea
  - Alpini Battalion "Ivrea"
    - 38th, 39th, 40th, 86th, and 111th Alpini Company
  - Alpini Battalion "Aosta"
    - 41st, 42nd, 43rd, 87th, and 103rd Alpini Company
  - Alpini Battalion "Intra"
    - 7th, 24th, 37th, and 112th Alpini Company
  - Alpini Battalion "Val d'Orco"
    - 238th, 239th, and 240th Alpini Company
  - Alpini Battalion "Val Baltea"
    - 241st, 242nd, and 280th Alpini Company
  - Alpini Battalion "Val Toce"
    - 207th, 243rd, and 281st Alpini Company

By the end of 1915 the Alpini regiments began to form additional companies with recruits born in 1896. These new companies were numbered from 118th to 157th and were used, together with the 38 companies formed earlier, to form an additional reserve battalion for each regular battalion. These new battalions were named for a mountain (Italian: Monte) located near their associated regular Alpini battalion's base, and the reserve battalions received the same Nappina as their associated regular Alpini battalion. The 4th Alpini Regiment thus added the following Monte battalions:

- Alpini Battalion "Monte Levanna"
  - 86th, 111th, and 132nd Alpini Company
- Alpini Battalion "Monte Cervino"
  - 87th, 103rd, and 133rd Alpini Company
- Alpini Battalion "Monte Rosa"
  - 112th, 134th, and 135th Alpini Company

As the mountainous terrain of the Italian front made the deployment of entire Alpini regiments impracticable, the regimental commands of the eight Alpini regiments were disbanded in March 1916. Likewise in April 1916 the pre-war alpine brigade commands were disbanded, and the personnel of the regimental commands and alpine brigade commands used to from twenty regiment-sized group commands and nine brigade-sized grouping commands. Afterwards Alpini battalions were employed either independently or assigned to groups, groupings, or infantry divisions as needed.

In February and March 1917 the Royal Italian Army formed twelve skiers battalions, each with two skiers companies. On 22 May 1917, the V Skiers Battalion was disbanded and its personnel used to form the 302nd Alpini Company. The company was assigned to the Alpini Battalion "Pallanza", which was formed on the same day. The new battalion was assigned to the 4th Alpini Regiment and included, besides the 302nd Alpini Company, the newly formed 282nd and 283rd Alpini companies. The battalion was associated with the Alpini Battalion "Ivrea" and therefore its troops wore a white Nappina.

During the war a total of 31,000 men served in the 4th Alpini Regiment, of which 189 officers and 4,704 soldiers were killed in action, while 455 officers and 10,923 soldiers were wounded. On 18–27 May 1917, during the Tenth Battle of the Isonzo, the regiment's Alpini Battalion "Aosta" stormed and held the summit of Monte Vodice, and on 25–27 October 1918, during the Battle of Vittorio Veneto, the "Aosta" stormed and held the summit of Monte Solarolo. For these two actions, which cost the Alpini Battalion "Aosta" 403, respectively 669 casualties, the "Aosta" was awarded a Gold Medal of Military Valor, making it the only Alpini unit to be awarded Italy's highest military honor throughout the war. Additionally six of the 4th Alpini Regiment's battalions were awarded a Silver Medals of Military Valor for their conduct and sacrifice during the war:

- the Alpini Battalion "Monte Cervino" was awarded a Silver Medal of Military Valor for its conduct on Cima Bisorte during the Austro-Hungarian Asiago Offensive in May 1916, its conduct at Bodrež and on Monte Vodice during the Tenth Battle of the Isonzo in May 1917, and for fighting to its annihilation in the Melette massif, where the battalion suffered 1,209 casualties on Monte Fior in November and December 1917.
- the Alpini battalions "Intra" and "Val d'Orco" were awarded a shared Silver Medal of Military Valor for having conquered Height 2163 to the East of the summit of Krn on 19–21 July 1915.
- the Alpini battalions "Aosta" and "Val Toce" were awarded a shared Silver Medal of Military Valor for the "Aosta" battalion's sacrifice during a failed attack on the Alpe di Cosmagnon in the Pasubio sector on 10 September 1916, which cost the battalion 353 casualties, and a subsequent successful attack by the two battalions in the same sector on 9–12 October 1916.
- the Alpini battalions "Aosta" and "Monte Levanna" were awarded a shared Silver Medal of Military Valor for the storming and holding of the summit of Monte Vodice on 18–21 May 1917. The Alpini battalions "Monte Levanna" and "Val Toce" were awarded a shared Silver Medal of Military Valor for having supported the "Aosta" battalion during the conquest of the summit of Monte Solarolo on 25–27 October 1918.

The Gold Medal of Military Valor and the five Silver Medals of Military Valor were affixed to the 4th Alpini Regiment's flag and added to the regiment's coat of arms.

=== Interwar years ===
After the end of the war the Valle and Monte battalions were disbanded, while the Alpini Battalion "Intra" was sent to the Italian Protectorate of Albania to fight in the Vlora War. On 1 January 1920, the regimental command was reformed and the regiment consisted of the Alpini battalions "Ivrea" and "Aosta". In 1921, the regiment was assigned to the 2nd Alpine Division, which also included the 5th Alpini Regiment, 6th Alpini Regiment, and 3rd Mountain Artillery Regiment. On 12 February 1921, the Alpini Battalion "Monte Levanna" was reformed, while the Alpini Battalion "Intra" was transferred after its return from Albania to the 5th Alpini Regiment. With the transfer of the battalion also the military awards of the battalion were transferred from the 4th Alpini Regiment to the 5th Alpini Regiment and affixed to the flag of the latter. In 1923, the 2nd Alpine Division was replaced by the II Alpini Grouping, which in 1926 was reorganized as I Alpine Brigade. The brigade included, besides the 4th Alpini Regiment, also the 1st Alpini Regiment, 2nd Alpini Regiment, 3rd Alpini Regiment, and 1st Mountain Artillery Regiment. In April of the same year, the Alpini Battalion "Monte Levanna" was disbanded, while in December the Alpini Battalion "Intra" returned from the 5th Alpini Regiment to the 4th Alpini Regiment.

On 19 October 1933, I Alpine Brigade was split and the 1st Alpini Regiment and 2nd Alpini Regiment were assigned to the newly formed IV Alpine Brigade, while the 3rd Alpini Regiment, 4th Alpini Regiment, and 1st Mountain Artillery Regiment remained with the I Alpine Brigade. In 1934 the regiment moved from Ivrea to Aosta. On 27 October 1934, the I Alpine Brigade was renamed I Superior Alpine Command. In December of the same year the command was given the name "Taurinense". On 31 October 1935, the I Superior Alpine Command "Taurinense" was reorganized as 1st Alpine Division "Taurinense", which included the 3rd Alpini Regiment, 4th Alpini Regiment, and 1st Alpine Artillery Regiment "Taurinense".

=== Second Italo-Ethiopian War ===
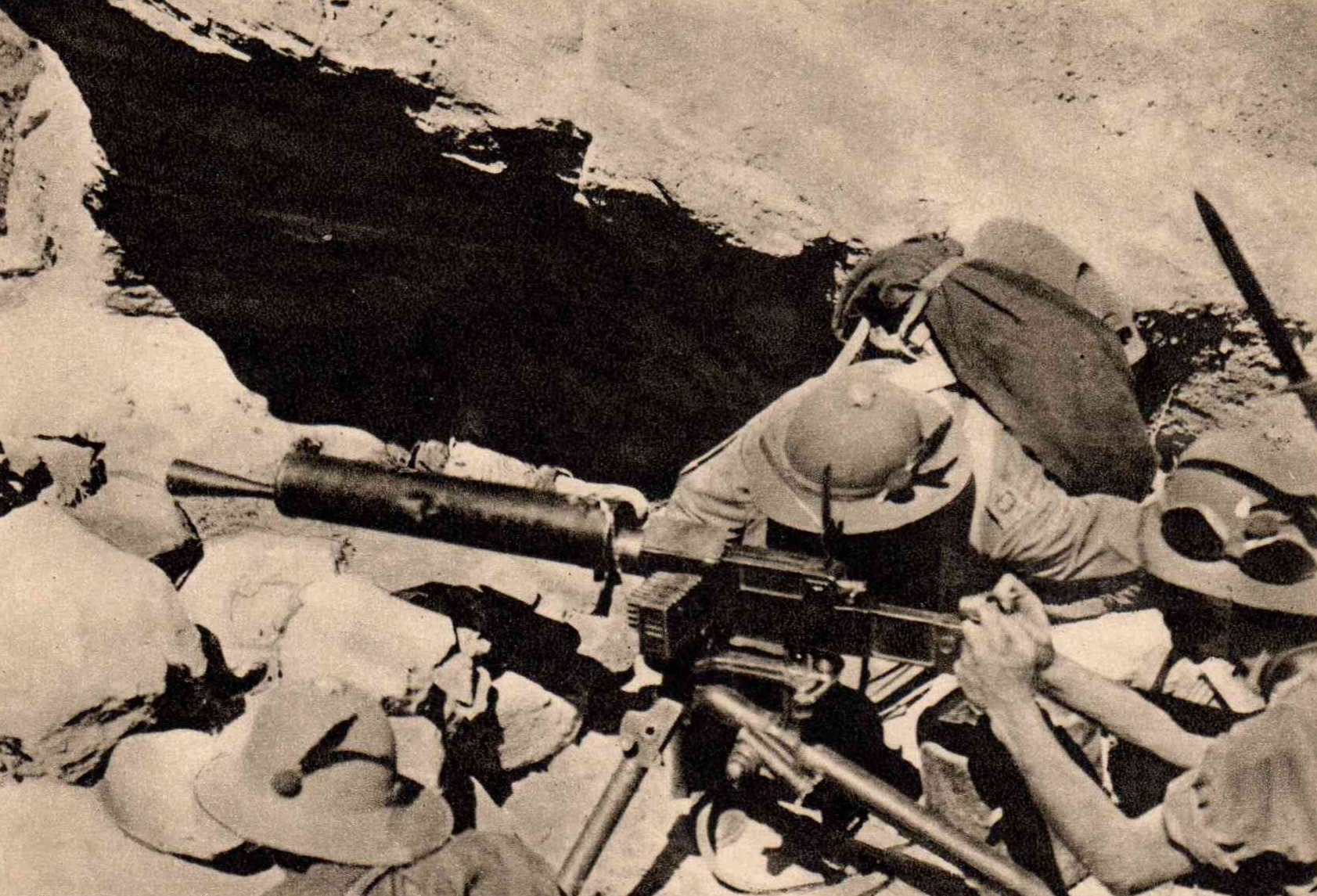
Alpini with a Fiat–Revelli Mod. 1914 machine gun during the Battle of Amba Aradam

On 22 December 1935, the 4th Alpini Regiment transferred its Alpini Battalion "Intra" to the newly formed 11th Alpini Regiment, which on 31 December of the same year was assigned to the newly formed 5th Alpine Division "Pusteria". The new division had been formed for the Second Italo-Ethiopian War and on 6 January 1936 the "Pusteria" division's units embarked in Livorno and Naples for the transfer to Massawa in Eritrea. The same month the 4th Alpini Regiment formed the 623rd Company, which consisted of volunteers and was assigned to the XI Replacements Battalion. The XI Replacements Battalion was attached to 11th Alpini Regiment and shipped to East Africa, where in the meantime the "Pusteria" was engaged in combat against Ethiopian troops. In East Africa the Alpini Battalion "Intra" fought in the Battle of Maychew, during which the battalion distinguished itself at Mekan Pass and was awarded a Silver Medal of Military Valor, which was affixed to the flag of the 4th Alpini Regiment and added to the regiment's coat of arms. In April 1937, the Alpini Battalion "Intra" returned to Italy and the regiment.

=== World War II ===
On 25 August 1939, shortly before the German Invasion of Poland, the Alpini battalions "Val d'Orco", "Val Baltea", and "Val Toce" were reformed with reservists. On 10 June 1940, the day Italy entered World War II, the regiment fielded 160 officers and 5,046 other ranks for a total strength of 5,206 men. The regiment had 23 horses, 1,242 mules and 109 transport vehicles at its disposal. The regiment's organization at the time was as follows:

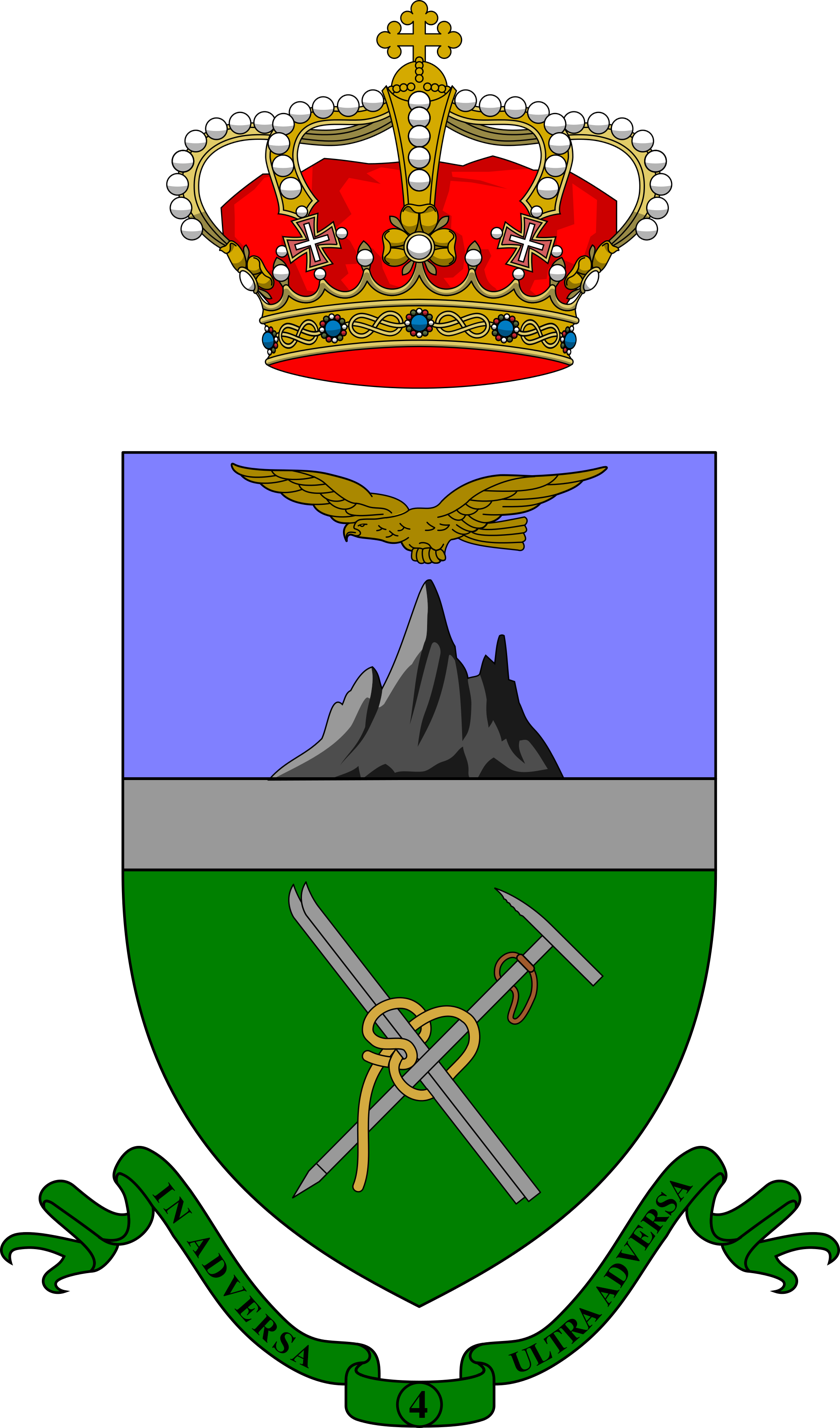
- 4th Alpini Regiment, in Aosta
  - Regimental Command Company
  - Alpini Battalion "Ivrea”
    - Command Company
    - 38th, 39th, and 40th Alpini Company
  - Alpini Battalion "Aosta"
    - Command Company
    - 41st, 42nd, and 43rd Alpini Company
  - Alpini Battalion "Intra"
    - Command Company
    - 7th, 24th, and 37th Alpini Company
  - 4th Supply Section
  - 4th Medical Section (includes a Field Hospital)
  - 24th Train Section (equipped with mules)

In June 1940 the regiment participated in the invasion of France. After the invasion the "Taurinense" division deployed to Southern France on occupation duty. On 31 October 1940, the Alpini battalions "Val d'Orco", "Val Baltea", and "Val Toce" were disbanded.

==== Balkans Campaign ====
On 18 December 1940, the regiment formed the Skiers battalions "Monte Rosa" and "Monte Cervino", which were immediately sent to Albania, where the Italian front was crumbling under heavy Greek attacks during the Greco-Italian War. On 8 January 1941, the Alpini Battalion "Intra" embarked in Bari for the transfer to Albania, where the battalion reinforced the 4th Alpine Division "Cuneense" on the frontline. The three battalions fought in Albania until the end of the war in April 1941. Following the German invasion and Axis occupation of Greece, the two skiers battalions were disbanded in May 1941, while the Alpini Battalion "Intra" returned to the 4th Alpini Regiment. For its conduct on the Greek Front between 10 January and 23 April 1941 the Skiers Battalion "Monte Cervino" was awarded a Silver Medal of Military Valor, while the Alpini Battalion "Intra" was awarded a Bronze Medal of Military Valor for the conquest of three heights on 24–26 January 1941. Both medals were affixed to the flag of the 4th Alpini Regiment and added to the regiment's coat of arms.

In the course of 1941, the Alpini battalions "Val Toce" and "Val d'Orco" was reformed and assigned to the 3rd Alpini Group, respectively to the 4th Alpine Valley Group of the 6th Alpine Division "Alpi Graie".

==== Eastern Front ====
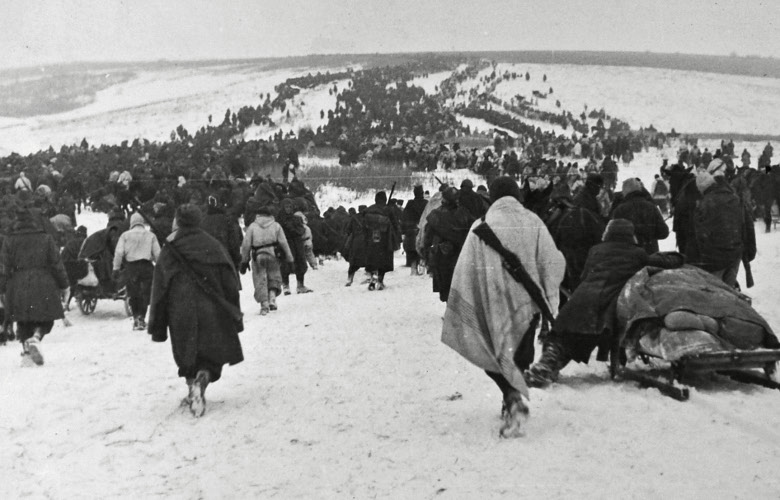
Alpini troops retreat in Ukraine in January 1943

In October 1941, the 4th Alpini Regiment reformed the Skiers Battalion "Monte Cervino", which on 13 January 1942 departed Aosta for the Eastern Front, where the battalion reinforced the Italian Expeditionary Corps in Russia. In summer 1942 the Italian Expeditionary Corps in Russia was expanded to Italian 8th Army, which consisted of the Alpine Army Corps, II Army Corps, and XXXV Army Corps. The Skiers Battalion "Monte Cervino" was assigned to the 8th Army's General Staff. The 8th Army covered the left flank of the German 6th Army, which spearheaded the German summer offensive of 1942 towards Stalingrad. On 12 December 1942, the Red Army commenced Operation Little Saturn, which, in its first stage, attacked and encircled the Italian 8th Army's II Army Corps and XXXV Army Corps. On 13 January 1943, the Red Army launched the second stage of Operation Little Saturn with the Voronezh Front encircling and destroying the Hungarian Second Army to the northwest of the Alpine Army Corps.

On the evening of 17 January 1943, the Alpine Army Corps commander, General Gabriele Nasci, ordered a full retreat. At this point only the 2nd Alpine Division "Tridentina" was still capable of conducting combat operations. The 40,000-strong mass of stragglers — Alpini and Italians from other commands, plus German and Hungarians — followed the "Tridentina", which led the way westwards to the new Axis lines. As the Soviets had already occupied every village, bitter battles had to be fought to clear the way. On the morning of 26 January 1943, the spearheads of the "Tridentina" reached the hamlet of Nikolayevka, occupied by the Soviet 48th Guards Rifle Division. The Soviets had fortified the railway embankment on both sides of the village. General Nasci ordered a frontal assault and by nightfall the troops of the "Tridentina" division had managed to break through the Soviet lines. The Italian troops continued their retreat, which was no longer contested by Soviet forces. On 1 February 1943 the remnants of the Alpine Army Corps reached Axis lines. For its bravery and sacrifice in the Soviet Union the Skiers Battalion "Monte Cervino was awarded a Gold Medal of Military Valor, which was affixed to the flag of the 4th Alpini Regiment and added to the regiment's coat of arms.

In 1943 the 4th Alpini Regiment reformed the Skiers Battalion "Monte Rosa", which was assigned to the XX Skiers Grouping. The grouping also included the Alpini Battalion "Val Cenischia", which had been formed by the 3rd Alpini Regiment, and the Alpini Battalion "Val Toce". On 15 June 1943, the Alpini Battalion "Val Cenischia" was renamed Skiers Battalion "Moncenisio", while the Alpini Battalion "Val Toce" was renamed Skiers Battalion "Monte Cervino". The XX Skiers Grouping was attached to the 5th Alpine Division "Pusteria", which was on occupation duty in Southern France in the Alpes-Maritimes. After the announcement of the Armistice of Cassibile on 8 September 1943 invading German forces disbanded the XX Skiers Grouping and its battalions.

==== Montenegro campaign ====
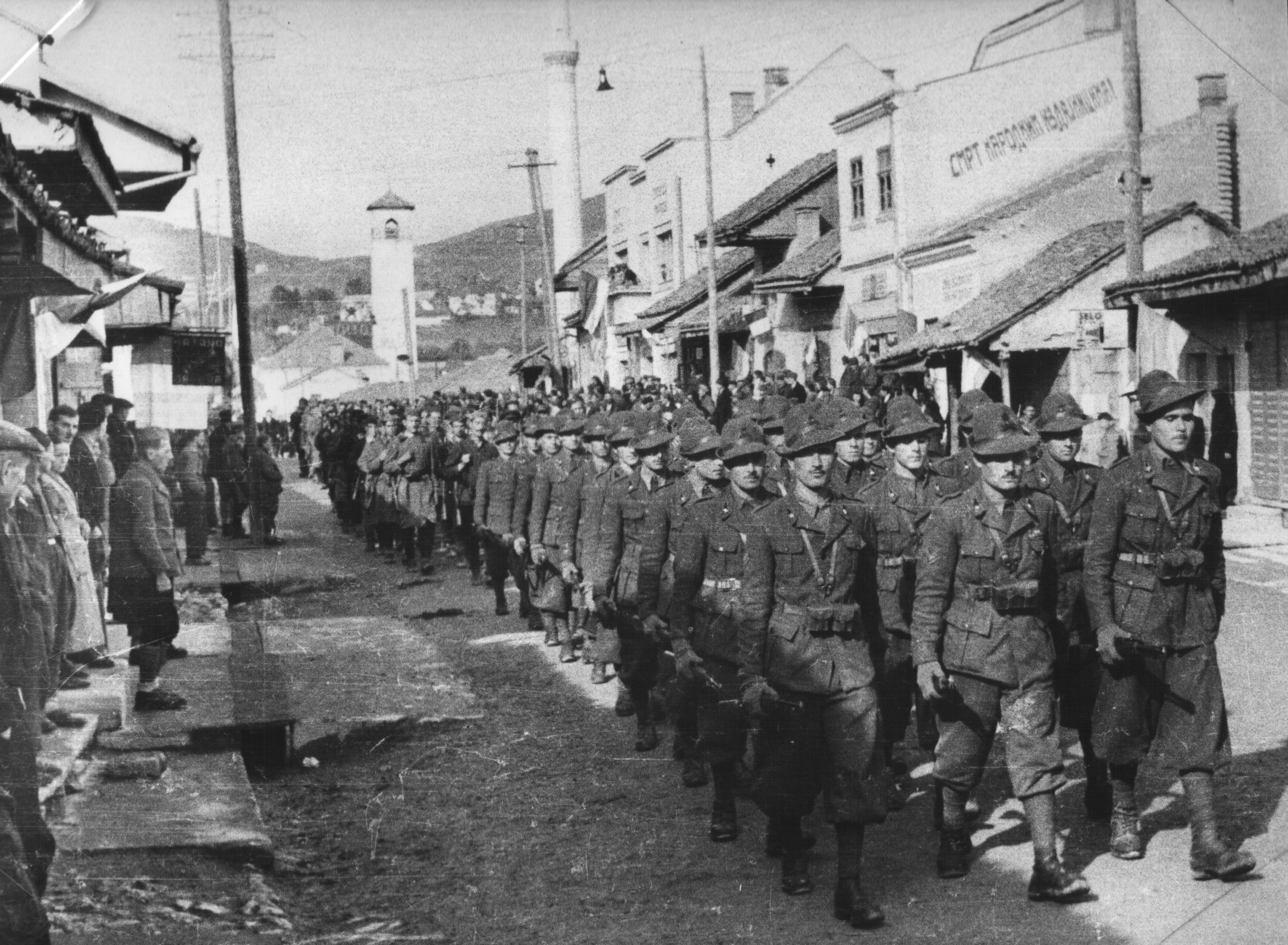
1st Alpine Division Taurinense troops in Pljevlja October 1943

In January 1942 the "Taurinense" division landed in Dubrovnik and from where it moved to Mostar in Croatia. From 15 April to 31 May 1942 the division participated in the third Axis anti-Partisan offensive. The division captured Trnovo and advanced to Kalinovik, where it made contact with elements of the 22nd Infantry Division "Cacciatori delle Alpi"; but, overall, the offensive was a failure. In August 1942 the Taurinense moved to Nikšić in Montenegro.

In May and June 1943 the "Taurinense" division took part in the fifth Axis anti-Partisan offensive. After the announcement of the Armistice of Cassibile on 8 September 1943 most of the division "Taurinense" immediately attacked German positions and by sunrise of 9 September the division was fully engaged in combat with German forces. The division tried to reach Kotor to be evacuated by sea to Apulia in Southern Italy, but in heavy combat the division lost about half its strength of 14,000 men. By early October 1943, the remnants of the division and its regiments were forced to surrender to the Germans. Only about 150 men of the Alpini Battalion "Fenestrelle" and a handful of men of other "Taurinense" units managed to commandeer ships and boats and escape to Apulia.

However, on 9 September 1943, the Alpini Battalion "Ivrea", the Alpine Artillery Group "Aosta", and the 40th Battery of the Alpine Artillery Group "Susa" had ignored the order to move to Kotor and sided with Tito's Yugoslav National Liberation Army forces right away. By early October the remnants these units, together with the remaining troops of the 19th Infantry Division "Venezia", retreated towards Pljevlja. On 2 December 1943 in Pljevlja the remaining Italian soldiers, approximately 16,000 men, were grouped together in the Division "Garibaldi". Integrated into the Partisan 2nd Corps the division fought in Montenegro, Herzegovina, Bosnia, and Sandžak until February 1945, when the last troops were repatriated via the liberated harbour of Dubrovnik.

For its conduct, loyalty and bravery in Montenegro between 8 September and 31 November 1943 the Alpini Battalion "Ivrea" was awarded a Silver Medal of Military Valor, which was affixed to the flag of the 4th Alpini Regiment and added to the regiment's coat of arms.

==== Italian Campaign ====
When the Armistice of Cassibile was announced 287 Alpini were waiting in Bari in Apulia to be shipped to Montenegro as replacements for the "Taurinense" division. On 28 October 1943, these Alpini and the men of the Alpini Battalion "Fenestrelle", who had managed to escape from Montenegro, were grouped together by the Italian Co-Belligerent Army in an Alpini Reconnaissance Unit. On 4 December 1943, this unit was reorganized as Alpini Battalion "Taurinense". On 1 January 1944, the battalion was renamed Alpini Battalion "Piemonte". On 19 March 1944, the battalion entered the Italian Liberation Corps, which fought on the allied side in the Italian campaign. In June 1944 the Alpini Battalion "Monte Granero", which had been formed by the 3rd Alpini Regiment and fought against German forces in Corsica after the announcement of the Armistice, was transferred from Sardinia to Southern Italy, where on 25 June 1944, the Alpini battalions "Piemonte" and "Monte Granero" entered the reformed 3rd Alpini Regiment. The regiment was assigned, together with the 4th Bersaglieri Regiment, to the I Brigade of the Italian Liberation Corps.

On 24 September 1944, the Italian Liberation Corps and 4th Bersaglieri Regiment were disbanded, while on 30 September 1944, the 3rd Alpini Regiment was reorganized as Special Infantry Regiment "Legnano". At the same time the Alpini Battalion "Monte Granero" was disbanded and its personnel integrated into the Alpini Battalion "Piemonte". On 1 October 1944, the Special Infantry Regiment "Legnano" received the Alpini Battalion "Abruzzi", and then consisted of the Bersaglieri Battalion "Goito" and the Alpini battalions "Piemonte" and "Abruzzi". The regiment then joined to the Combat Group "Legnano", which was equipped with British materiel and assigned to the Polish II Corps of the British 8th Army. On 25 November 1944, the Alpini Battalion "Abruzzi" was renamed Alpini Battalion "L'Aquila". The Combat Group "Legnano"fought on the allied side in the Italian campaign until the German surrender. For its conduct and service between 18 March 1944 to 8 May 1945 with the Italian Liberation Corps and then the Combat Group "Legnano" the Alpini Battalion "Piemonte" was awarded a Silver Medal of Military Valor.

=== Cold War ===
On 25 April 1945, an Alpini regiment was formed in Meran, which was initially designated 4th Alpini Regiment as it had been formed within the area overseen by the IV Territorial Military Command. On 10 April 1946, that regiment was renumbered as 6th Alpini Regiment.

On 23 November 1945, an Alpini regiment was formed in Turin, which was initially designated 1st Alpini Regiment as it was formed within the area overseen by the I Territorial Military Command. The regiment consisted of the I, II, and III Alpini battalions, which had been formed by renaming the 530th, 526th, and 515th guard battalions of the Italian Co-belligerent Army. On 1 January 1946, the I Alpini Battalion was renamed Alpini Battalion "Saluzzo", while the II Alpini Battalion was renamed Alpini Battalion "Susa". On 1 February 1946, the Alpini Battalion "Saluzzo" was transferred to the Special Infantry Regiment "Legnano", which in turn ceded the Alpini Battalion "Piemonte" to the 1st Alpini Regiment. On the same date, 1 February 1946, the Alpini Battalion "Piemonte" was renamed Alpini Battalion "Aosta", while the regiment's III Alpini Battalion was renamed Alpini Battalion "Saluzzo". On 15 April 1946, the regiment was renumbered as 4th Alpini Regiment.

On 1 January 1950, the 4th Alpini Regiment formed a recruits training battalion in Bra, which was designated Battalion "Mondovì". On 15 April 1952, the 4th Alpini Regiment joined the newly formed Alpine Brigade "Taurinense". On 1 January 1953, the Battalion "Mondovì" was renamed Recruits Training Battalion and on the same date the regiment began the process of reforming the Alpini Battalion "Mondovì". The 4th Alpini Regiment now consisted of the Alpini Battalion "Mondovì", which was one of the traditional battalions of the 1st Alpini Regiment, the Alpini Battalion "Aosta", which was one of the traditional battalions of the 4th Alpini Regiment, the Alpini Battalion "Saluzzo", which was one of the traditional battalions of the 2nd Alpini Regiment, the Alpini Battalion "Susa", which was one of the traditional battalions of the 3rd Alpini Regiment, and the 4th Mortar Company.

- 4th Alpini Regiment, in Turin
  - Command and Services Company, in Turin
  - 4th Mortar Company, in Turin
  - Alpini Battalion "Mondovì", in Bra
    - Command and Services Company
    - 9th, 10th, and 11th Alpini Company
  - Alpini Battalion "Aosta", in Aosta
    - Command and Services Company
    - 41st, 42nd, and 43rd Alpini Company
  - Alpini Battalion "Saluzzo", in Borgo San Dalmazzo
    - Command and Services Company
    - 21st, 22nd Alpini, and 23rd Alpini Company
  - Alpini Battalion "Susa", in Pinerolo
    - Command and Services Company
    - 34th, 35th, and 36th Alpini Company

In June 1957 the regiment's units were deployed across Piedmont, which had been inundated by severe floods. For its work after the floods the 4th Alpini Regiment was awarded a Silver Medal of Civil Valor, which was affixed to the regiment's flag. On 1 November 1962, the Alpini Battalion "Mondovì" moved from Bra in Piedmont to Paluzza in Friuli-Venezia Giulia, where the battalion joined the 8th Alpini Regiment of the Alpine Brigade "Julia". However the battalion continued to be composed of recruits drafted in Piedmont. Between May 1963 and June 1966, the Alpini Battalion "Aosta" was assigned to the Alpine Military School in Aosta. Between 1 September 1964 and 1 October 1968, the Alpini Battalion "Saluzzo" was reduced to a reserve unit. On 31 December 1964, the 4th Mortar Company was split to form the 143rd Mortar Company for the Alpini Battalion "Aosta" and the 133rd Mortar Company for the Alpini Battalion "Susa". On 31 December 1974, the Alpini Battalion "Mondovì" was reduced to a reserve unit.

During the 1975 army reform the army disbanded the regimental level and newly independent battalions were granted for the first time their own flags. On 1 July 1975, the Alpini Battalion "Aosta" was assigned to the Alpine Military School. On 10 October 1975, the 4th Alpini Regiment was disbanded and the next day the regiment's remaining two Alpini battalions "Saluzzo" and "Susa" became autonomous units and were assigned to the Alpine Brigade "Taurinense". The battalions "Aosta", "Saluzzo", and "Susa" consisted now of a command, a command and services company, three Alpini companies, and a heavy mortar company with eight 120mm Mod. 63 mortars. Each of the three Alpini battalions fielded now 950 men (45 officers, 96 non-commissioned officers, and 809 soldiers).

On 12 November 1976, the President of the Italian Republic Giovanni Leone assigned with decree 846 the flag and traditions of the 4th Alpini Regiment to the Alpini Battalion "Aosta". In case of war the "Aosta" battalion would have been assigned to the Alpine Brigade "Taurinense" as the brigade's third Alpini battalion.

In October 1987, the "Aosta" battalion lost its wartime role as third battalion of the "Taurinense" brigade. On 11 September 1989, the battalion was reorganized and renamed Tactical Logistic Support Battalion "Aosta". The battalion provided logistic support to the Alpine Military School and trained the recruits destined to serve at the School, while the battalion's Alpieri Company in Courmayeur provided advanced high altitude training. The battalion's organization at the time was as follows:

- Tactical Logistic Support Battalion "Aosta", in Aosta
  - Command and Services Company
  - Maintenance and Transport Company
  - Alpieri Company, in Courmayeur
  - 41st Demonstration Company
    - Recruits Platoon, Fusiliers Platoon, Anti-tank Platoon, and Mortar Platoon

=== Recent times ===
On 1 July 1998, Tactical Logistic Support Battalion "Aosta" merged with the Alpine Military School's Complement Officer Cadets Battalion and was renamed Training Battalion "Aosta". The same year the School was renamed Alpine Training Center and assigned to the Alpine Troops Command. In 2001, the Training Battalion "Aosta" was reduced to Training Unit "Aosta" and the flag of the 4th Alpini Regiment transferred to the Shrine of the Flags in the Vittoriano in Rome.

On 24 September 2004, the Alpini Paratroopers Battalion "Monte Cervino" (Ranger) in Bolzano lost its autonomy and the next day the battalion entered the 4th Alpini Paratroopers Regiment, which inherited the flag, traditions, honors and coat of arms of the 4th Alpini Regiment. On 24 June 2011, the regiment moved from Bolzano to Montorio Veronese. In 2013, the regiment was assigned to the newly formed Army Special Forces Command.

Troops of the battalion and then the regiment were repeatedly deployed to Mozambique, Bosnia and Herzegovina, and Kosovo, and once the war on terror began also to Iraq, Afghanistan, Libya, Lebanon, and Somalia. For its many deployments between 2002 and 2018 the 4th Alpini Paratroopers Regiment was awarded a Military Order of Italy, which was affixed to the regiment's flag. In 2021 the regiment formed the Operational Support Battalion "Intra".

== Organization ==
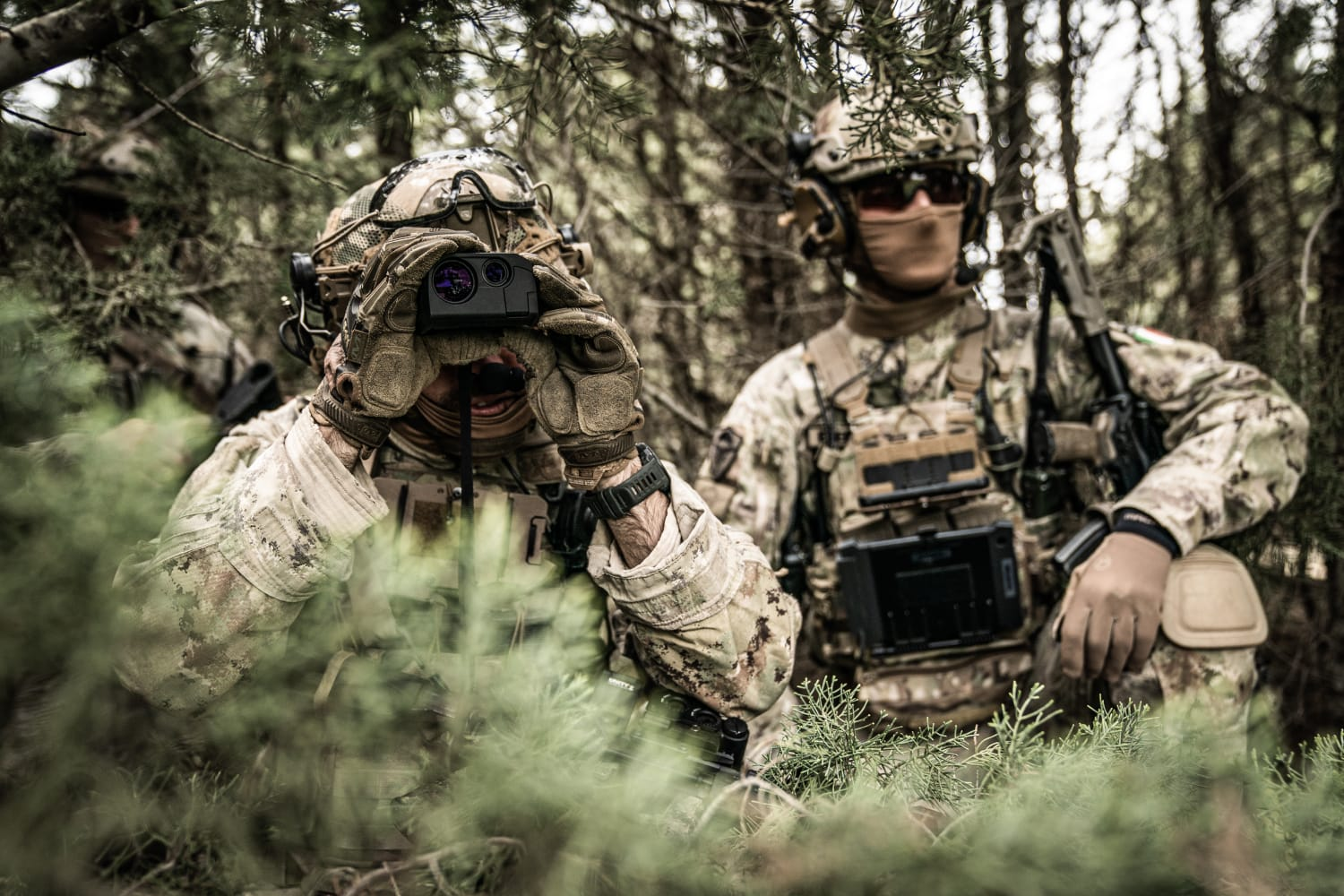
4th Alpini Paratroopers Regiment reconnaissance team during exercise Scudo 25

As of 2024 the 4th Alpini Paratroopers Regiment is one of three Italian Army special forces regiments and organized as follows:

- 4th Alpini Paratroopers Regiment, in Montorio Veronese
  - Regimental Command
    - Staff and Personnel Office
    - Operations, Training and Information Office
    - Logistic and Administrative Office
    - Command and Logistic Support Company
  - Alpini Paratroopers Battalion "Monte Cervino"
    - 1st Ranger Company
    - 2nd Ranger Company
    - 3rd Ranger Company
    - 80th Maneuver Support Company
  - Operational Support Battalion "Intra"
    - Operational Support Company
    - Training Company

The Operational Support Company consists of a C4 Platoon and a Mobility Support Platoon. Each Ranger company fields three platoons of 36 men. The Maneuver Support Company fields an Anti-tank Platoon with eight Spike MR anti-tank guided missiles launchers, a Heavy Mortar Platoon with three F1 120mm mortars, and a Medium Mortar Platoon with three Expal 81mm mortars. The manoeuvre support company is equipped with a total of six F1 120mm mortars and six Expal 81mm mortars, allowing the mortar platoons to switch between calibres as needed.

== See also ==
- Mino – TV series about the Alpini Battalion "Aosta" during World War I
