= Alpini Paratroopers Battalion "Monte Cervino" =

Italian Army special operations unit

- Battaglione Alpini Paracadutisti "Monte Cervino"
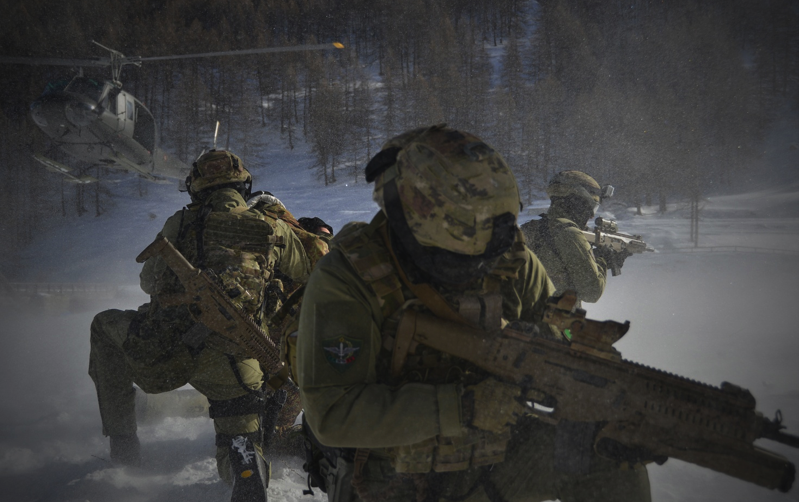
- Alpini Paratroopers during an exercise
- Active: Nov. 1915 — 1919; 18 Dec. 1940 — May 1941; Oct. 1941 — Feb. 1943; 15 June 1943 — 8 Sept. 1943; 14 July 1996 — today
- Country: Italy
- Branch: Italian Army
- Type: Special forces
- Part of: Army Special Forces Command
- Garrison/HQ: Montorio Veronese
- Motto(s): "Mai strac"
- Decorations: 1x Military Order of Italy; 1x Gold Medal of Military Valor; 2x Silver Medals of Military Valor

Insignia
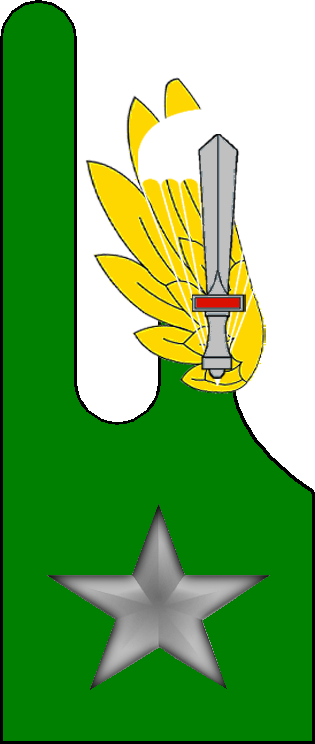
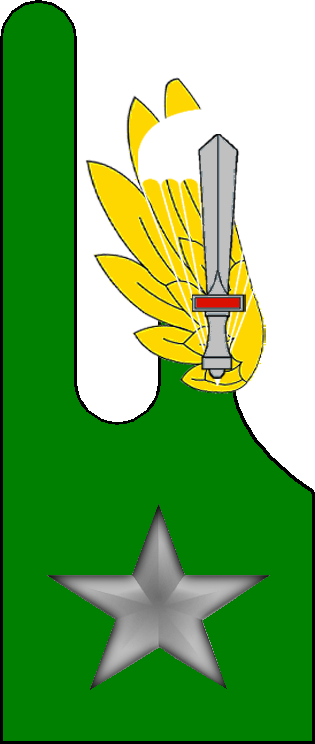
- Alpini Paratroopers gorget patches

The Alpini Paratroopers Battalion "Monte Cervino" is a Special Forces unit of the Italian Army. The battalion belongs to the Italian Army's Alpini infantry speciality and is assigned to the 4th Alpini Paratroopers Regiment. In November 1915, the Royal Italian Army's 4th Alpini Regiment formed the Alpini Battalion "Monte Cervino", which served during World War I on the Italian front. For its conduct and valor during the war the battalion, which was disbanded in 1919, was awarded a Silver Medal of Military Valor.

In December 1940, the battalion was reformed as Skiers Battalion "Monte Cervino". The battalion served in the Greco-Italian War, during which it distinguished itself and was awarded its second Silver Medal of Military Valor. In May 1941, the battalion was disbanded once more, only to the reformed already five months later in October 1941. In January 1942, the Skiers Battalion "Monte Cervino" was sent to Eastern Front, where it served with the Italian Expeditionary Corps in Russia. In summer 1942, the battalion was assigned to the 8th Army's General Staff. In January 1943, the battalion was destroyed during the Soviet Operation Little Saturn. For its bravery and sacrifice in the Soviet Union the Skiers Battalion "Monte Cervino was awarded a Gold Medal of Military Valor.

In June 1943, the battalion was reformed by renaming the Alpini Battalion "Val Toce". The battalion was deployed in Southern France, when the Armistice of Cassibile was announced on 8 September 1943. The battalion was then disbanded by invading German forces.

In July 1996, the "Monte Cervino" battalion was reformed as the Alpini Paratroopers Battalion "Monte Cervino". On 24 September 2004, the Alpini Paratroopers Battalion "Monte Cervino" lost its autonomy and the next day the battalion entered the 4th Alpini Paratroopers Regiment. Since then the history of the "Monte Cervino" continues with the 4th Alpini Paratroopers Regiment.

== History ==
=== World War I ===
At the outbreak of World War I, the Alpini speciality consisted of eight regiments, which fielded 26 battalions with 79 companies. After Italy's initial declaration of neutrality, 38 additional Alpini companies were formed during the autumn of 1914 with men, who had completed their military service in the preceding four years. These companies were numbered from 80th to 117th and assigned to the existing Alpini battalions. As part of this expansion the Alpini Battalion "Aosta" of the 4th Alpini Regiment formed the 87th and 103rd Alpini Company.

By the end of 1915, the Alpini regiments began to form additional companies with recruits born in 1896. These new companies were numbered from 118th to 157th and were used, together with the 38 companies formed earlier, to form an additional reserve battalion for each regular battalion. These new battalions were named for a mountain (Italian: Monte) located near their associated regular Alpini battalion's base, and the reserve battalions received the same Nappina as their associated regular Alpini battalion. In November 1915 the command of the Alpini Battalion "Monte Cervino" and the 133rd Alpini Company were formed. The new battalion was associated with the Alpini Battalion "Aosta", which ceded the 87th and 103rd Alpini Company to the "Monte Cervino" battalion.

After a short training period in Tirano, the battalion was sent in April 1916 to the Asiago plateau, where Austro-Hungarian Army tried to break through the Italian front in the Austrian Asiago offensive. On 15 May 1916, the 103rd Alpini Company was overcome by Austro-Hungarian troops on Cima Bisorte and forced to surrender. The 87th and 133rd Alpini companies, which fought on the Borcola Pass, were able to retreat. In June 1916, the 103rd Alpini Company was reformed. In September 1916, the battalion participated in the Italian counteroffensive on the Pasubio massif.

In 1917, the battalion moved to the Isonzo Front, where it took heavy casualties in an attempt to take Monte Vodice during the Tenth Battle of the Isonzo. In November and December of the same year, the battalion was tasked to defend Monte Fior in the Melette massif on the Asiago plateau against a renewed Austrian attack. The defence of Monte Fior between 17 November and 4 December 1917 cost the battalion 1,209 casualties. In the first half of 1918 the battalion was again on the Pasubio, while during the Battle of Vittorio Veneto the battalion was deployed on Monte Grappa.

For its service and sacrifice during the war the Alpini Battalion "Monte Cervino" was awarded a Silver Medal of Military Valor for its conduct on Cima Bisorte during the Austro-Hungarian Asiago Offensive in May 1916, its conduct at Bodrež and on Monte Vodice during the Tenth Battle of the Isonzo in May 1917, and for fighting to its annihilation in the Melette massif. The medal was affixed to the flag of the 4th Alpini Regiment and added to the regiment's coat of arms. In 1919 the Alpini Battalion "Monte Cervino" was disbanded.

=== World War II ===
==== Balkans Campaign ====
On 18 December 1940, the 4th Alpini Regiment formed the Skiers battalions "Monte Rosa" and "Monte Cervino", which both consisted of a command platoon and two skiers companies. The two battalions were immediately sent to Albania, where the Italian front was crumbling under heavy Greek attacks during the Greco-Italian War. The two battalions fought in Albania until the end of the war in April 1941. Following the German invasion and Axis occupation of Greece, the two skiers battalions were disbanded in May 1941. For its conduct on the Greek Front between 10 January and 23 April 1941 the Skiers Battalion "Monte Cervino" was awarded a Silver Medal of Military Valor, which was affixed to the flag of the 4th Alpini Regiment and added to the regiment's coat of arms.

==== Eastern Front ====
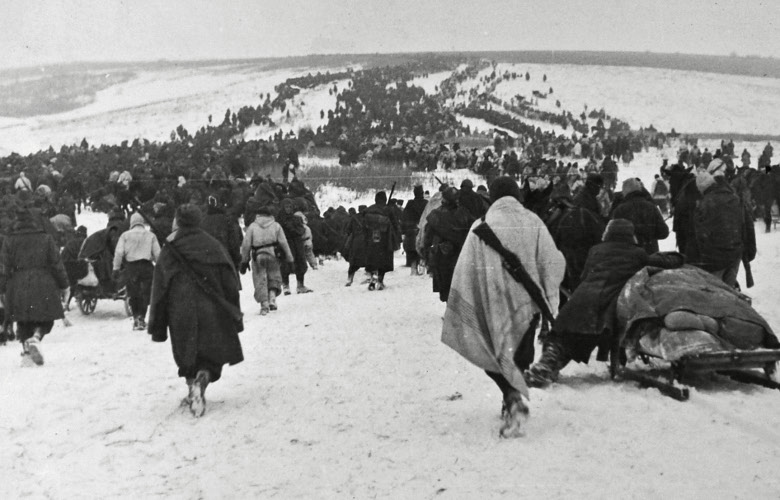
Alpini troops retreat in Ukraine in January 1943

In October 1941, the 4th Alpini Regiment reformed the Skiers Battalion "Monte Cervino". The battalion consisted of a command platoon, the 1st and 2nd Skiers companies, and the 80th Support Weapons Company. On 13 January 1942, the battalion departed Aosta for the Eastern Front, where the battalion reinforced the Italian Expeditionary Corps in Russia. In summer 1942, the Italian Expeditionary Corps in Russia was expanded to Italian 8th Army, which consisted of the Alpine Army Corps, II Army Corps, and XXXV Army Corps. The Skiers Battalion "Monte Cervino" was assigned to the 8th Army's General Staff. The 8th Army covered the left flank of the German 6th Army, which spearheaded the German summer offensive of 1942 towards Stalingrad. On 12 December 1942, the Red Army commenced Operation Little Saturn, which, in its first stage, attacked and encircled the Italian 8th Army's II Army Corps and XXXV Army Corps. On 13 January 1943, the Red Army launched the second stage of Operation Little Saturn with the Voronezh Front encircling and destroying the Hungarian Second Army to the northwest of the Alpine Army Corps.

On the evening of 17 January 1943, the Alpine Army Corps commander, General Gabriele Nasci, ordered a full retreat. At this point only the 2nd Alpine Division "Tridentina" was still capable of conducting combat operations. The 40,000-strong mass of stragglers — Alpini and Italians from other commands, plus German and Hungarians — followed the "Tridentina", which led the way westwards to the new Axis lines. As the Soviets had already occupied every village, bitter battles had to be fought to clear the way. On the morning of 26 January 1943, the spearheads of the "Tridentina" reached the hamlet of Nikolayevka, occupied by the Soviet 48th Guards Rifle Division. The Soviets had fortified the railway embankment on both sides of the village. General Nasci ordered a frontal assault and by nightfall the troops of the "Tridentina" division had managed to break through the Soviet lines. The Italian troops continued their retreat, which was no longer contested by Soviet forces. On 1 February 1943, when the remnants of the Alpine Army Corps reached Axis lines, the Skiers Battalion "Monte Cervino" was down to a handful of men. For its bravery and sacrifice in the Soviet Union the Skiers Battalion "Monte Cervino was awarded a Gold Medal of Military Valor, which was affixed to the flag of the 4th Alpini Regiment and added to the regiment's coat of arms.

==== Southern France ====
In 1943 the 4th Alpini Regiment reformed the Skiers Battalion "Monte Rosa", which was assigned to the XX Skiers Grouping. The grouping also included the Alpini Battalion "Val Cenischia", which had been formed by the 3rd Alpini Regiment, and the Alpini Battalion "Val Toce", which had been formed earlier by the 4th Alpini Regiment. On 15 June 1943, the Alpini Battalion "Val Toce" integrated the survivors of the "Monte Cervino" battalion and was then renamed Skiers Battalion "Monte Cervino". The XX Skiers Grouping was attached to the 5th Alpine Division "Pusteria", which was on occupation duty in Southern France in the Alpes-Maritimes. After the announcement of the Armistice of Cassibile on 8 September 1943 invading German forces disbanded the XX Skiers Grouping and its battalions.

=== Cold War ===
During the Cold War, the IV Army Corps ordered its five brigades to form Alpini Paratrooper platoons. On 1 September 1952, the Alpine Brigade "Tridentina" formed the Alpini Paratroopers Platoon "Tridentina". Further platoons were then formed in the Alpine Brigade "Julia", Alpine Brigade "Taurinense", Alpine Brigade "Cadore" and Alpine Brigade "Orobica". On 1 April 1964, the platoons were merged to form the Alpini Paratroopers Company in Bolzano. The company was assigned to the IV Army Corps and supported by the IV Light Aviation Unit and IV Helicopters Unit, which were both based at Bolzano Airport.

=== Recent times ===
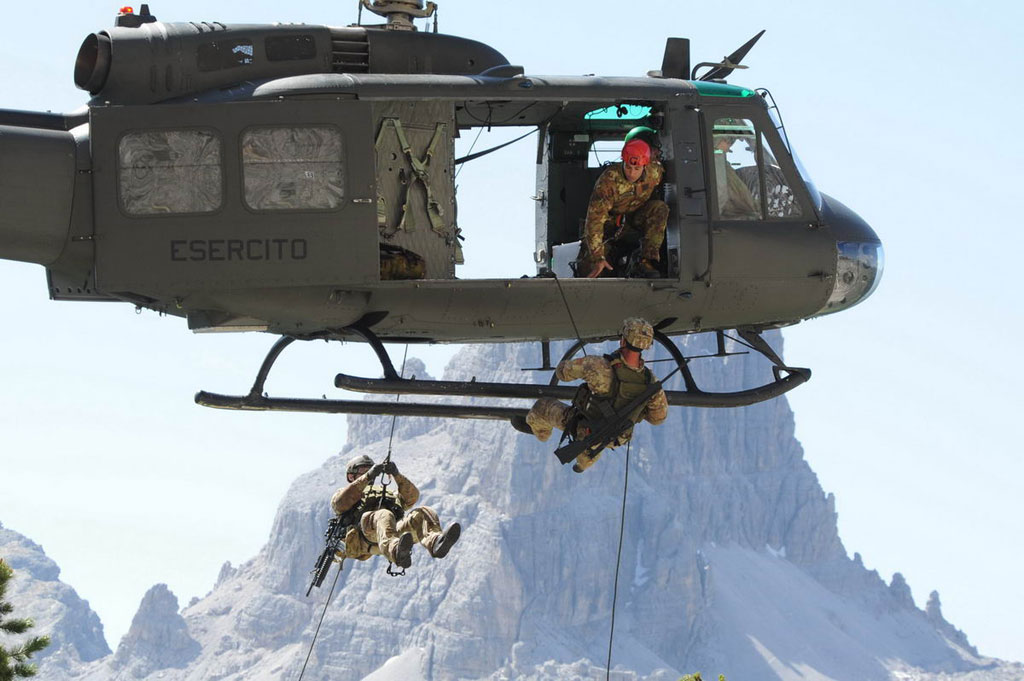
4th Alpini Paratroopers Regiment personnel abseiling from an AB205 helicopter during the Falzarego 2011 exercise

On 1 January 1990, the company was renamed Alpini Paratroopers Company "Monte Cervino" and assigned the honors and traditions of the preceding units, which carried the name "Monte Cervino". At the time the company consisted of a command and services platoon, two Alpini paratrooper platoons, an anti-tank platoon equipped with TOW anti-tank guided missiles, and a mortar platoon equipped with 81mm mortars. In 1992, the company moved from Bolzano to St. Michael in Eppan. In 1993, the company deployed to Mozambique with the United Nations Operation in Mozambique. On 30 November 1994, the company's personnel were issued the newly designed Alpini Paratroopers gorget patches. The same year the company returned to Mozambique.

In 1995, the company moved from St. Michael to Bolzano. On 14 July 1996, the company entered the newly formed Alpini Paratroopers Battalion "Monte Cervino" as 1st Alpini Paratroopers Company. The battalion then commenced with the formation of a second Alpini Paratroopers Company. On 10 April 1997, the battalion received its flag, however the Gold Medal of Military Valor and two Silver Medals of Military Valor awarded to the "Monte Cervino" battalion remained affixed to the flag of the 4th Alpini Regiment, which had been assigned in 1976 to the Alpini Battalion "Aosta".

In 1997, the battalion deployed to Bosnia and Herzegovina with NATO's Stabilisation Force in Bosnia and Herzegovina. In 1999, the battalion's personnel became Ranger-qualified and the name of the battalion was changed to Alpini Paratroopers Battalion "Monte Cervino" (Ranger). Starting in 2002, the battalion was constantly present with part of its troops in Afghanistan as part of the International Security Assistance Force.

In 2001, the "Aosta" battalion was reduced to a training unit and the flag of the 4th Alpini Regiment was transferred to the Shrine of the Flags in the Vittoriano in Rome. On 24 September 2004, the Alpini Paratroopers Battalion "Monte Cervino" (Ranger) lost its autonomy and the next day the battalion entered the 4th Alpini Paratroopers Regiment, which inherited the flag, traditions, honors and coat of arms of the 4th Alpini Regiment. Since then the history of the "Monte Cervino" continues with the 4th Alpini Paratroopers Regiment.
