= Run to the Tower =

The Run to the Tower is a 12-kilometer (7.456 miles) run from the front gate of Camp Darby to the Leaning Tower of Pisa which takes place annually in Italy.
