= Lorenzo Vivalda =

Italian general

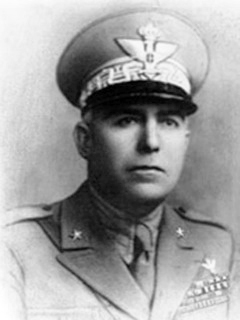
- Born: 31 October 1890; Alba, Kingdom of Italy
- Died: 12 November 1945 (aged 55); Ronciglione, Kingdom of Italy
- Military career
- Allegiance: Kingdom of Italy
- Branch: Royal Italian Army
- Service years: 1909–1945
- Rank: Brigadier General
- Commands: "Aosta" Alpini Battalion; 81st Infantry Regiment "Torino"; 5th Alpini Regiment; 1st Alpine Division Taurinense "Garibaldi" Partisan Division; 230th Coastal Division
- Conflicts: Italo-Turkish War; First Italo-Senussi War; World War I; Battle of Mount Ortigara; Battle of Caporetto; World War II; North African campaign; Italian invasion of Egypt; Operation Compass; Italian occupation of Montenegro; Yugoslav front
- Awards: Silver Medal of Military Valor (twice); Bronze Medal of Military Valor (three times); Military Order of Savoy; Order of the Crown of Italy; Order of Saints Maurice and Lazarus

Lorenzo Vivalda (31 October 1890 – 12 November 1945) was an Italian general during World War II, mostly known for his role in Montenegro in command of the 1st Alpine Division Taurinense and later of the Italian Partisan Division "Garibaldi" after the Armistice of Cassibile.

== Biography ==
He was born in Alba on 31 October 1890, the son of Carlo Vivalda and Teresa Mulazzano. He began his military career by enlisting in the Royal Italian Army at age nineteen, being appointed second lieutenant on 17 September 1911. On the following year he left for Libya with the 2nd Alpini Regiment, participating in the Italo-Turkish War and subsequent operations against the Senussi insurgency. He distinguished himself in combat on 25 May 1913, for which he was decorated with a bronze medal of military valor. After promotion to lieutenant, he fought on the Italian front during World War I; in the summer of 1915 he fought in the Carnic Alps, receiving another bronze medal of military valor, after which he was promoted to captain and given command of the "Aosta" Alpini Battalion, distinguishing himself in combat on Mount Ortigara where he earned a third bronze medal. He then became adjutant of the commander of the 8th Alpini Group, and during the battle of Caporetto he replaced the commander of the "Val Arroscia" Alpini Battalion, who had been killed in action, during the fighting on Monte Stella, restoring order in the battalion and leading it in a counterattack until he was seriously wounded. For this action he was awarded a Silver Medal of Military Valor.

After the end of the war he was assigned to the territorial military division of Pola, later being transferred to the 1st Alpine Group on 20 May 1923. On 5 December 1926, he was promoted to lieutenant colonel, and on 19 September 1935 he assumed command of the 81st Infantry Regiment "Torino", a post he held until 20 November 1936, when he assumed command of the 5th Alpini Regiment. He was promoted to colonel on 21 January 1937, and left command of the 5th Alpini Regiment on 2 February 1938, becoming Deputy Chief of Staff at the Armed Forces High Command in North Africa, in Tripoli, where he was at the entry of the Kingdom of Italy into World War II, on 10 June 1940.

He held this post until 31 March 1941, receiving a second Silver Medal for military valor for his behaviour during the invasion of Egypt and Operation Compass. He was promoted to brigadier general on 1 July 1941, and on 12 October he was assigned to the territorial defense command of Genoa until 10 March 1942, when he was transferred to the XV Army Corps. On 15 April 1942 he assumed command of the 1st Alpine Division Taurinense, engaged in anti-partisan operations in Slovenia, Croatia, northern Dalmatia, Bosnia and Herzegovina. In August 1942 the Division was transferred to Montenegro, with headquarters in Nikšić, where it still was at the time of the Armistice of Cassibile in September 1943, scattered in various garrisons. Before the time of the armistice, he was positively rated by the German higher command in Yugoslavia, which in a collection of assessments of Italian leaders judged him as "open, forthright, [a] good leader, [with] good cooperation".

He rejected German demands to surrender all weapons, joined in his decision by the majority of the officers and troops of his division; along with the 19th Infantry Division Venezia and the remnants of the 155th Infantry Division Emilia, he resisted German attacks and joined the Yugoslav partisans with his men. In Pljevlja on 2 December 1943 these troops, numbering around 20,000, were merged into an Italian Partisan Division, named "Garibaldi", within the Yugoslav People's Liberation Army; its first commander was General Giovanni Battista Oxilia, former commander of the Venezia Division, with Vivalda as deputy commander. In February 1944 Oxilia was repatriated and Vivalda assumed command of the "Garibaldi" Division in his place, maintaining it until 12 August of the same year, when he was in turn repatriated and replaced by Colonel Carlo Ravnich.

After his return to Italy he was initially placed at the disposal of the Ministry of War, being decorated with the Officer's Cross of the Military Order of Savoy; in November 1944 he assumed command of the 230th Coastal Division. He died in a car crash in Ronciglione, province of Viterbo, on 12 November 1945.
