= Army Special Forces Command (Italy) =

- Comando delle Forze Speciali dell'Esercito
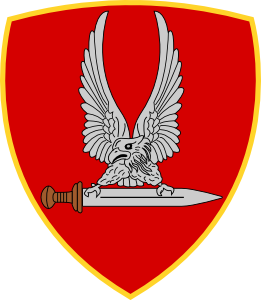
- Coat of Arms of the Army Special Forces Command
- Active: 19 September 2014 - present
- Country: Italy
- Branch: Italian Army
- Role: Special Forces
- Size: Brigade
- Part of: Operational Land Forces Command
- Garrison/HQ: Pisa

The Army Special Forces Command (Italian: Comando delle Forze Speciali dell'Esercito - COMFOSE) in Pisa is a brigade-level command of the Italian Army, which is responsible for the training, preparation, doctrinal and procedural development, and the materiel acquisition of the army's special forces and special operation forces. Operationally the units of the Army Special Forces Command fall under the Joint Special Forces Operations Command (Italian: Comando interforze per le operazioni delle Forze speciali - COFS). The command was activated on 19 September 2014 in Pisa.

== Structure ==
As of September 2020 the command is organized as follows:

- Army Special Forces Command, at Camp Darby (Tuscany)
  - 4th Alpini Paratroopers Regiment, in Montorio Veronese (Veneto)
    - Alpini Paratroopers Battalion "Monte Cervino"
    - Operational Support Battalion "Intra"
  - 9th Paratroopers Assault Regiment "Col Moschin", at Camp Darby (Tuscany)
    - Raiders Battalion
    - Operational Support Battalion
    - Raiders Training Unit
  - 185th Paratroopers Reconnaissance Target Acquisition Regiment "Folgore", in Livorno (Tuscany)
    - 3rd Target Acquirers Battalion "Poggio Rusco"
    - Operational Support Battalion
  - Special Operations Support Unit, at Camp Darby
    - Command and Logistic Support Company
    - Signal Company
  - Special Operations Training Center, at Camp Darby
    - 1st Basic Training Company
    - 2nd Advanced Training Company

The units of the Command are supported by the Army Aviation Brigade's 3rd Special Operations Helicopter Regiment "Aldebaran".

== Gorget patches ==
The personnel of the command's units wears the following gorget patches:

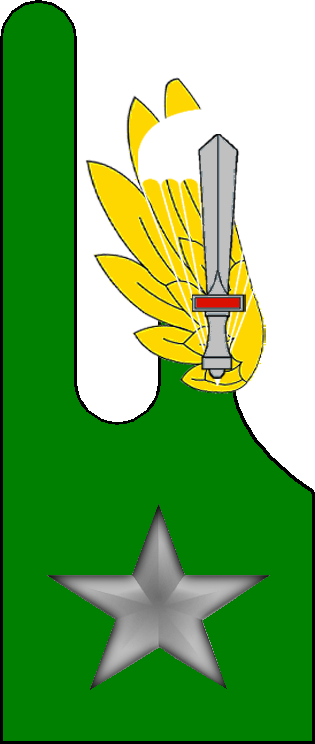
4th Alpini Paratroopers Regiment

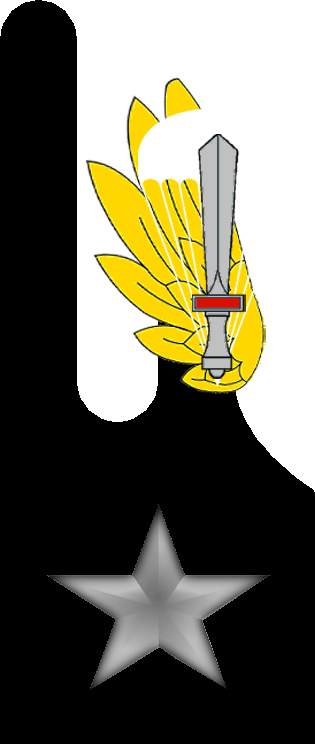
9th Paratroopers Assault Regiment "Col Moschin"

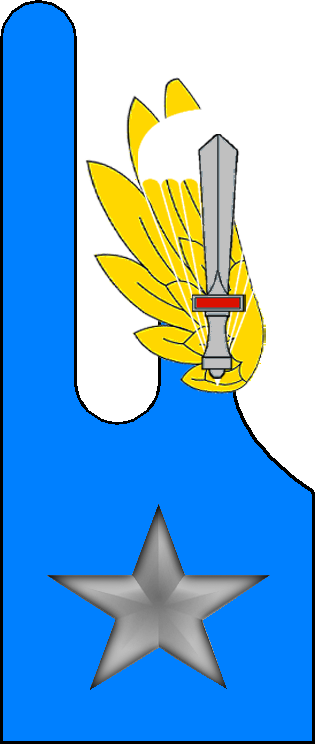
185th Paratroopers Recon Rgt. "Folgore"
