= 1st Alpine Division "Taurinense" =

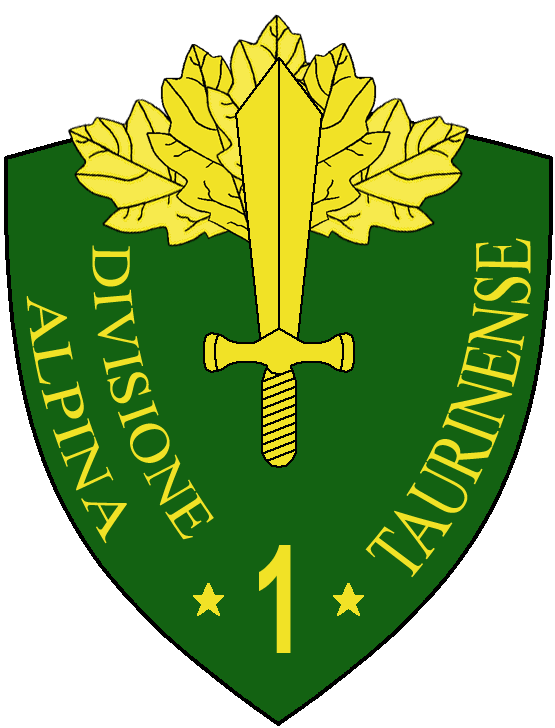
- 1st Alpine Division "Taurinense" insignia
- Active: September 10, 1935 – September 10, 1943
- Country: Kingdom of Italy
- Branch: Royal Italian Army
- Type: Alpini
- Role: Mountain Infantry
- Size: 17,460 men
- Garrison/HQ: Turin
- Engagements: World War II

Commanders
- Notable commanders: Lorenzo Vivalda

Insignia
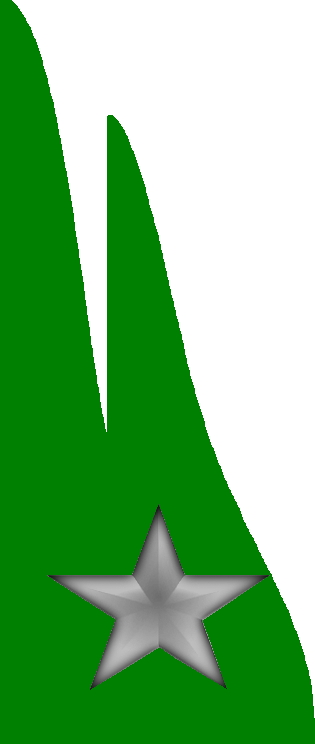
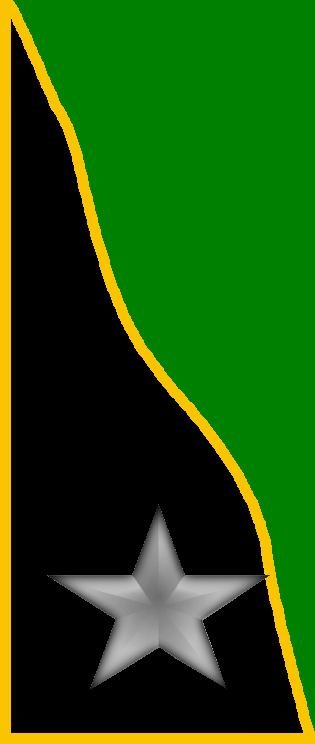
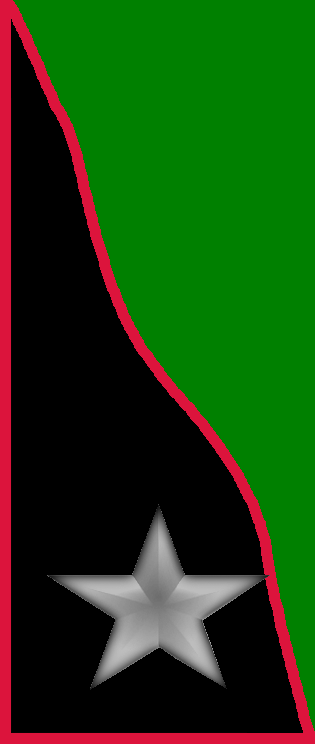
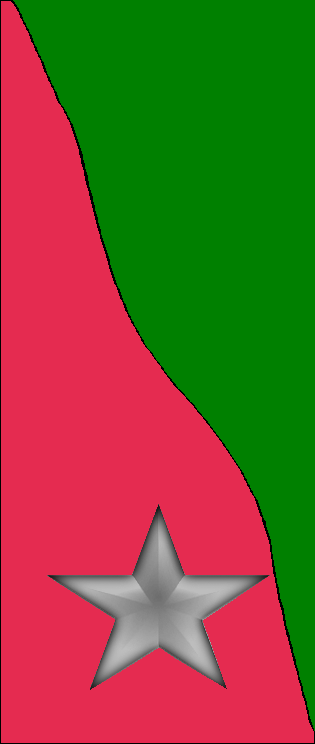
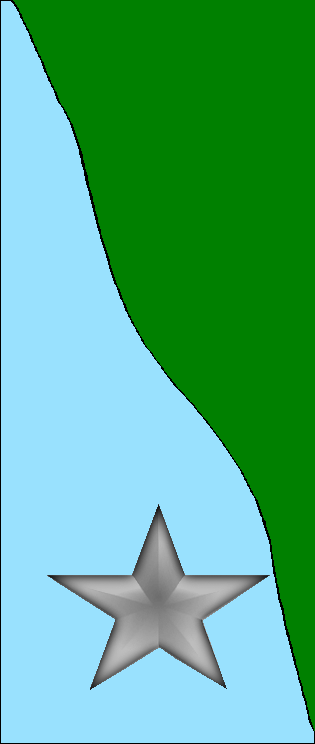
- Identification symbol: Taurinense Division gorget patches

The 1st Alpine Division "Taurinense" (Italian: 1ª Divisione alpina "Taurinense") was a division of the Royal Italian Army during World War II, which specialized in mountain warfare. The Alpini that formed the division are a highly decorated and elite mountain corps of the Italian Army consisting of both infantry and artillery units. Today, the traditions and name of the 1st Alpine Division "Taurinense" are carried on by the Alpine Brigade "Taurinense". The headquarters of the division was in the city of Turin and the majority of its soldiers were drafted from the surrounding Province of Turin — therefore the division was named "Taurinense" for the Roman name of the city of Turin Augusta Taurinorum.

== History ==
The division's lineage begins with the I Alpine Brigade formed in Turin on 11 March 1926 with the 1st, 2nd, 3rd, and 4th Alpini regiments and the 1st Mountain Artillery Regiment. On 19 October 1933 the brigade was split and the IV Alpine Brigade with the 1st and 2nd Alpini regiments was raised in Cuneo. On 27 October 1934 the brigade changed its name to I Superior Alpine Command, which received the name Taurinense in December of the same year (Italian: I Comando Superiore Alpino "Taurinense").

On 10 September 1935 the I Superior Alpine Command "Taurinense" was reformed as 1st Alpine Division "Taurinense" with the 3rd and 4th Alpini regiments and the 1st Alpine Artillery Regiment. On 25 December 1935 the Taurinense temporarily transferred its Alpini battalions "Exilles" and "Intra", and the Group "Susa", and two batteries from its alpine artillery regiment to the 5th Alpine Division "Pusteria" for the Second Italo-Ethiopian War.

=== World War II ===
The division participated in the Italian invasion of France in June 1940. On 21-22 June it participated in the attack on the Little St Bernard Pass. At the end of the war the division occupied Bourg-Saint-Maurice-Sainte-Foy.

In January 1942 the "Taurinense" division landed in Dubrovnik and from where it moved to Mostar in Croatia. From 15 April to 31 May 1942 the division participated in the third Axis anti-Partisan offensive. The division captured Trnovo and advanced to Kalinovik, where it made contact with elements of the 22nd Infantry Division "Cacciatori delle Alpi"; but, overall, the offensive was a failure.

In August 1942 the Taurinense moved to Nikšić in Montenegro. A year later the division took part in the fifth Axis anti-Partisan offensive, but did not complete its objectives there either. After the announcement of the Armistice of Cassibile on 8 September 1943 most of the division was captured by German forces near Kotor, while the Alpini Battalion "Ivrea" and Alpine Artillery Group "Aosta" joined the Yugoslav Partisans and formed the Partisan Division "Garibaldi".

== Organization ==
1st Alpine Division "Taurinense" organization in 1940

- 1st Alpine Division "Taurinense", in Turin
  - Headquarters
    - Command Company
    - 411th Carabinieri Section
    - 412th Carabinieri Section
    - 200th Field Post Office
    - 1st Alpine Division Command Transport Squad
  - 3rd Alpini Regiment, in Pinerolo
    - Command Company
    - Alpini Battalion "Pinerolo"
      - Command Company
      - 25th, 26th, and 27th Alpini companies
    - Alpini Battalion "Fenestrelle"
      - Command Company
      - 28th, 29th, and 30th Alpini companies
    - Alpini Battalion "Exilles"
      - Command Company
      - 31st, 32nd, and 33rd Alpini companies
    - 3rd Supply Section
    - 23rd Train Section (equipped with mules)
    - 3rd Medical Section (includes a Field Hospital)
  - 4th Alpini Regiment, in Aosta
    - Command Company
    - Alpini Battalion "Ivrea"
      - Command Company
      - 38th, 39th, and 40th Alpini companies
    - Alpini Battalion "Aosta"
      - Command Company
      - 41st, 42nd, and 43rd Alpini companies
    - Alpini Battalion "Intra"
      - Command Company
      - 7th, 24th, and 37th Alpini companies
    - 4th Supply Section
    - 24th Train Section (equipped with mules)
    - 4th Medical Section (includes a Field Hospital)
  - 1st Alpine Artillery Regiment, in Turin
    - Command Unit
    - Alpine Artillery Group "Susa" (75/13 mod. 15 mountain guns)
      - 1st Battery
      - 2nd Battery
      - 3rd Battery
      - 40th Battery
      - Ammunition and Supply Unit
    - Alpine Artillery Group "Aosta" (75/13 mod. 15 mountain guns)
      - 4th Battery
      - 5th Battery
      - 6th Battery
      - 53rd Battery
      - Ammunition and Supply Unit
  - I Mixed Alpine Engineer Battalion
    - Command Platoon
    - 101st Searchlight Section
    - 111th Telegraph and Radio Operators Company
    - 121st Engineer Company
  - 105th Supply Section
  - 203rd Mixed Transport Unit
  - 305th Medical Section (includes 4 × field hospitals)

Attached for the invasion of France:

- XII CC.NN. Battalion

Attached during operations in Montenegro:

- 10th CC.NN. Group
  - LIII CC.NN. Battalion
  - CLXII CC.NN. Battalion
  - CXIV Machine Gun Battalion
  - CVI Guardia alla Frontiera Machine Gun Battalion

== Military honors ==
On 13 January 1945 the President of Italy awarded the Alpine Artillery Group "Aosta" for its conduct after the announcement of the Armistice of Cassibile Italy's highest military honor, the Gold Medal of Military Valor.

- Alpine Artillery Group "Aosta" on 13 January 1945

== Commanding officers ==
The division's commanding officers were:

- Generale di Brigata Carlo Vecchiarelli (1935 - 1936)
- Generale di Brigata Luigi Nuvoloni (1936 - 1937)
- Generale di Brigata Paolo Micheletti (1937 - 26 June 1940)
- Colonel Lorenzo Richieri (acting; 27 June - 10 August 1940)
- Generale di Brigata Giovanni Maccario (11 August 1940 - 4 February 1942)
- Colonel Carlo Cigliana (acting, 5 February 1942 - 5 April 1942)
- Generale di Brigata Lorenzo Vivalda (15 April 1942 - 8 September 1943)
