= Monte Solarolo =

Mountain in Italy

Coordinates: 45°55′N 11°50′E

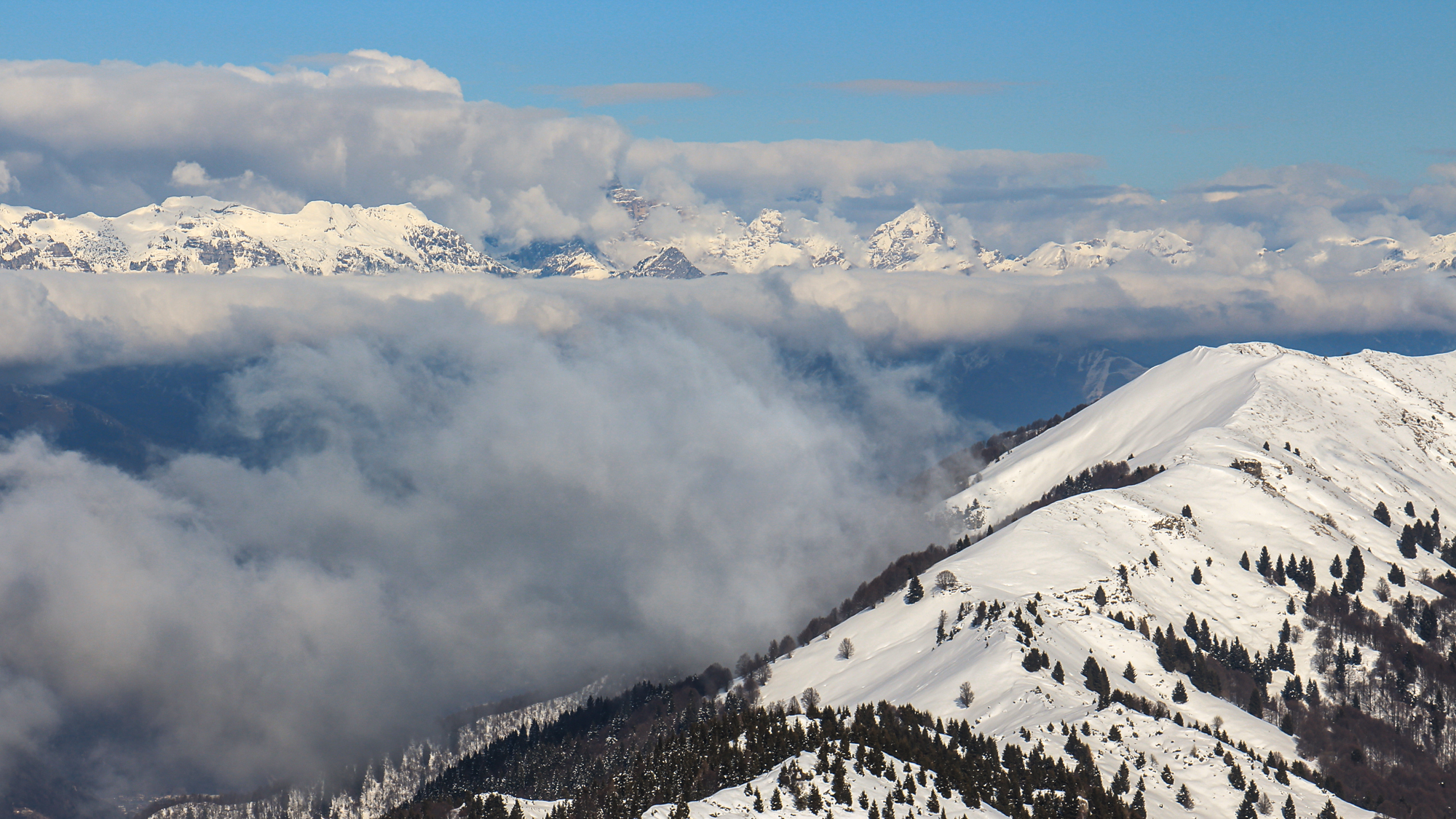

Highest point
- Elevation: 1,625 m (5,331 ft)

Geography
- Location: Veneto, Italy

Monte Solarolo is a mountain of the Veneto, Italy. It has an elevation of 1,625 metres. Monte Solarolo, one of the "Solaroli" peaks, is one of several peaks on the ridge from Monte Valderoa leads to the summit of Monte Grappa. This divides two important valleys of the massif, the Valley of Mure, descending becomes the torrent valley muscardine (Alano di Piave) and the Valley of Seren del Grappa, on the low Feltrino territory on the border with the municipalities of the Treviso foothills of Mt. Grappa. Fighting for the conquest of this summit in a long and bloody battle 25 to 27 October 1918, the Alpini Battalion "Aosta" of the 4th Alpini Regiment earned a Gold Medal of Military Valor.
