= Darby Military Community =

United States military complex in Italy

- Near Pisa, Tuscany in Italy
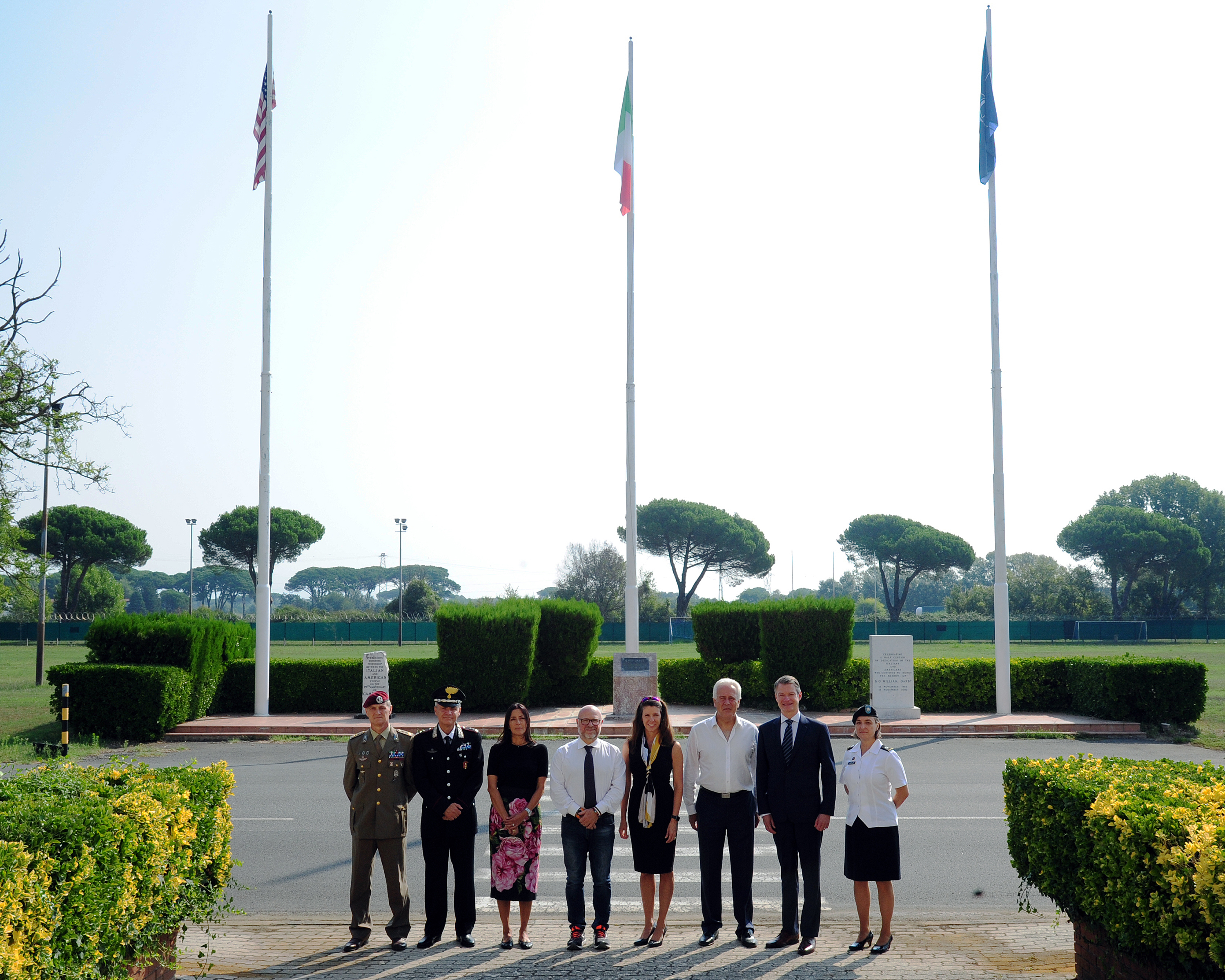

Site information
- Type: Army base
- Owner: Ministry of Defence
- Operator: Italian Army and United States Army
- Controlled by: Italian Army Special Forces Command and US Army Garrison Italy
- Condition: Operational
- Website: Official website (US Army Garrison Italy)

Location
- Location in Italy
- Coordinates: 43°38′N 10°19′E

Site history
- Built: 1952
- In use: 1952 – present

The Darby Military Community, previously known as Camp Darby, is a United States military complex in Italy located between Pisa and Livorno. It is under Italian military control and can be managed anytime by Italian authorities. The Northern part of the base has been transferred to the Italian Army, which transferred its Special Forces Command to Darby on 10 June 2020.

The base was formally dedicated on 15 November 1952 as Camp Darby, and is named in memory of Brigadier General William O. Darby, Assistant Division Commander of the 10th Mountain Division, who was killed by enemy artillery on 30 April 1945 on the shore of Lake Garda, Italy. The main square on Camp Darby is dedicated to the memory of Pvt. Masato “Curly” Nakae, a Japanese-American soldier who fought during World War II in the vicinity of Pisa with the 442nd Regimental Combat Team and the 100th Infantry Battalion (Separate) who was awarded the Medal of Honor for his heroic acts.

Camp Darby is home to the Darby Military Community, the 405th Army Field Support Battalion- Africa, 839th Transportation Battalion, and 731st Munitions Squadron.

During the late 1980s and early 1990s, the 7th Medical Command had its United States Army Europe (USAREUR) Contingency Hospital warehoused here. The 100 bed Contingency Hospital was congressionally mandated after the 1983 bombing of the Marine Corps barracks in Beirut, Lebanon. Its mission was to be prepared upon 18 hours' notice from Congress to respond to any terrorist or natural disaster in the eastern hemisphere. The unit drew its staff from hospitals throughout Europe and deployed in support of Display Determination exercises in Turkey (1987 and 1989) and northern Italy (1988).

In 2012 the U.S. Army announced that the Garrison at Camp Darby would be realigned as a satellite installation of USAG Vicenza at Caserma Ederle with some reduction in staffing and would be referred to in the future as Darby Military Community.
