= Bodrež, Kanal =

Bodrež
- Location in Slovenia
- Coordinates: 46°5′45.54″N 13°38′37.3″E
- Country: Slovenia
- Traditional region: Littoral
- Statistical region: Gorizia
- Municipality: Kanal ob Soči

Area
  - Total: 3.45 km^{2} (1.33 sq mi)
- Elevation: 162.5 m (533 ft)

Population (2002)
  - Total: 119

Bodrež (pronounced [ˈboːdɾɛʃ]) is a small settlement on the left bank of the Soča River in the Municipality of Kanal ob Soči in the Littoral region of Slovenia.
