= 8 (disambiguation) =

8 is a number, numeral, and glyph.

8 or eight may also refer to:

== Years ==
- AD 8, the eighth year of the AD era
- 8 BC, the eighth year before the AD era

== Art ==
- The Eight (Ashcan School), a group of twentieth century painters associated with the Ashcan School
- The Eight (painters), an avant-garde art movement of Hungarian painters

== Motor vehicles ==
- Bentley Eight, Bentley's "entry-level" offering from 1984 until 1992
- Leyland Eight, a luxury car produced by Leyland Motors from 1920 to 1923
- Mercury Eight, a first Post War Mercury car design
- Morris Eight, a small car inspired by the Ford Model Y
- Standard Eight, a small car produced by Standard Motor Company 1938–59
- Wolseley Eight, a four-door, light saloon car produced by Wolseley Motors Limited from 1946 to 1948
- Straight eight, an automobile engine
- Eight cylinder, an automobile engine
- Rover 8, a small single-cylinder 8 hp 1327 cc car

== Sports ==
- Eight (rowing), rowing boat used in the sport of competitive rowing
- Figure 8 (belay device), rock climbing equipment also known as an "eight"

== Transportation ==
- 8 (New York City Subway service), designation given to several IRT services
- 8 (Los Angeles Railway), a line operated by the Los Angeles Railway
- Eighth Avenue (Brooklyn), a major street in Brooklyn, New York City
- Eighth Avenue (Manhattan), a major avenue in Manhattan, New York City
- List of highways numbered 8
- List of public transport routes numbered 8
- Line 8 (disambiguation)

== Film, TV shows, and theatre ==
- 8 (2008 film), an anthology of eight short films
- 8 (2023 film), an Indian film
- 8 (2025 film), a Spanish romantic drama film
- 8: The Mormon Proposition, a 2010 American documentary film
- Eight (1998 film), a British short film directed by Stephen Daldry
- 8 (play), a 2011 play about California's Proposition 8 by Dustin Lance Black
- Eight (play), the first play written by Ella Hickson
- SBS 8 News, a South Korean flagship news program broadcast on SBS
- The 8 Show, a 2024 South Korean television series
- The Soul Collector (2019 film), a South African film (also known as 8: A South African Horror Story)

== Television and radio stations ==
- Channel 8 (disambiguation), several television stations
- Eight FM, a Malaysian Chinese-language radio station

== Music ==
- Eight (Japanese band), a Japanese metal band
- Eight (Korean band), stylized as 8Eight, a South Korean pop group
- The8, Chinese singer and member of South Korean group Seventeen

=== Albums ===
- 8 (Anggun album) (2017)
- 8 (Arvingarna album) (2005)
- 8 (Do As Infinity video) (2004)
- 8 (Gian Marco Zignago album) (2006)
- 8 (Hunter EP) (2009)
- 8 (Incubus album) (2017)
- 8 (J. J. Cale album) (1983)
- 8 (Kekal album) (2011)
- 8 (Luis Fonsi album) (2014)
- 8 (Shea Couleé album) (2023)
- 8 (Spinners album) (1977)
- 8 (Statik Selektah album) (2017)
- 8, by Bo Kaspers Orkester (2008)
- Eight (Boo Radleys album) (2023)
- Eight (Do As Infinity album) (2011)
- Eight (New Model Army album) (2000)
- Ei8ht (album), by Nik Kershaw (2012)
- Ei8ht (Shinedown album) (2026)

=== Songs ===
- "8", by Billie Eilish from When We All Fall Asleep, Where Do We Go? (2019)
- "8", by Kehlani from Crash (2024)
- "8", by Sigur Rós from Átta (2023)
- "Eight" (song), by IU featuring Suga (2020)
- "Eight", by Karma to Burn from Wild, Wonderful Purgatory (1999)

== Typography ==
- 8, the X-SAMPA symbol for the close-mid central rounded vowel, equivalent to the IPA symbol ɵ
- 8, a common substitute for the ou-ligature ȣ
- 8, a letter in the Old Italic script (𐌚) with the value /f/

== Other uses ==
- The Eight (novel), an American author Katherine Neville's first novel
- 8, numerical symbol for the month of August
- 8, the number used on a seven-segment display
- Windows 8, an operating system by Microsoft
- Eight, West Virginia, an unincorporated community
- 8 Flora, an asteroid in the asteroid belt
- Mario Kart 8, a Wii U kart racing game

== See also ==
- Eighth (disambiguation)
- Number Eight (disambiguation)
- Eights (disambiguation)
- 08 (disambiguation)
- 8 Mile (disambiguation)
- 8S (disambiguation)
- 8tv (disambiguation)
- 1/8 (disambiguation)
- Octet (disambiguation)
- V8 (disambiguation)
- The 8th (disambiguation)
- Figure 8 (disambiguation)
- Infinity symbol, ∞, a mathematical symbol
- Lemniscate, a figure-eight-shaped curve
