= Eighth =

Eighth is the ordinal form of the number eight.

Eighth may refer to:

- One eighth, 1/8, a fraction, one of eight equal parts of a whole
- Eighth note (quaver), a musical note played for half the value of a quarter note (crotchet)
- Octave, an interval between seventh and ninth
- Eighth octave C, a C note
- Eighth Lake, a lake by Inlet, New York
- Eighth (album), an album by Eleventh Dream Day

== Places ==
- 8th meridian east, a line of longitude extending through Europe and Africa
- 8th meridian west, a line of longitude extending through Europe and Africa
- 8th parallel north, a circle of latitude above the Equator
- 8th parallel south, a circle of latitude below the Equator
- 8th Street (disambiguation)
- Eighth Avenue (disambiguation)

== Time ==
- 8th century
- 8th century BC

=== Dates ===
- Eighth of the month, a recurring calendar date
  - Eighth of January
  - Eighth of February
  - Eighth of March
  - Eighth of April
  - Eighth of May
  - Eighth of June
  - Eighth of July
  - Eighth of August
  - Eighth of September
  - Eighth of October
  - Eighth of November
  - Eighth of December

== See also ==
- 1/8 (disambiguation)
- 8 (disambiguation)
- The 8th (disambiguation)
- The Eighth Day (disambiguation)
- Eighth Amendment (disambiguation)
- Eighth Army (disambiguation), military units
- 8th Division (disambiguation), military units
- 8th Squadron (disambiguation), military units
- 8th century and 8th century BC
