= Octet =

Octet may refer to:

== Music ==
- Octet (music), ensemble consisting of eight instruments or voices, or composition written for such an ensemble
  - String octet, a piece of music written for eight string instruments
    - Octet (Mendelssohn), 1825 composition by Felix Mendelssohn
    - Octet (Bruch), 1920 composition by Max Bruch
  - Octet (Beethoven), 1793 composition by Ludwig van Beethoven
  - Octet (Lachner), 1850 composition by Franz Lachner
  - Octet (Reich), 1979 composition by Steve Reich
  - Octet (Reinecke),1892 composition by Carl Reinicke
  - Octet (Schubert), 1824 composition by Franz Schubert
  - Octet (Stravinsky), 1923 composition by Igor Stravinsky
- Violin octet, a family of stringed instruments
- Octet (musical), a musical by Dave Malloy
  - Octet (film), an upcoming musical film directed by Lin-Manuel Miranda

== Ballet ==
- Octet (Christensen), 1958 ballet by Willam Christensen
- Octet (Martins), 2003 ballet by Peter Martins

== Science and technology ==
- Octet (computing), a grouping of eight bits
  - Byte, a unit of digital information that most commonly consists of eight bits
    - Octet stream, alternative name for byte stream
- Octet rule, chemical theory stating that atoms tend to combine so they each have eight valence electrons
- Octet truss, type of space frame

== See also ==
- 8 (disambiguation)
- Eightfold Way (physics), theory organizing subatomic baryons and mesons into octets
- Lambda cube
- Octal, base-8 number system
- Octant (solid geometry)
- Octave (poetry)
- Octetra, a sculpture by Isamu Noguchi
- Okta, a meteorological unit of measurement of cloud cover in terms of how many eighths of the sky are covered in clouds
