= United Air Lines Flight 736 =

1958 mid-air collision in Nevada

1958 Enterprise, Nevada mid air collision
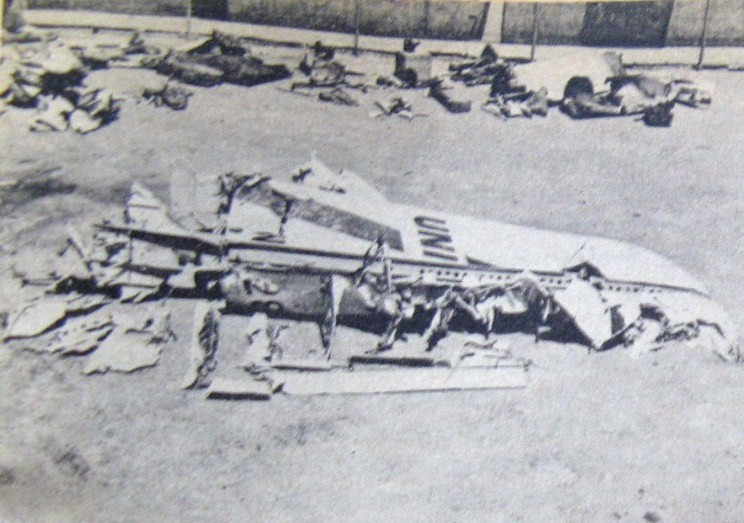
- Wreckage of Flight 736's vertical stabilizer

Accident
- Date: April 21, 1958
- Summary: Mid-air collision
- Site: Enterprise, Nevada, United States; 35°59′58″N 115°12′17″W (DC7 crash site)
- Total fatalities: 49
- Total survivors: 0

First aircraft
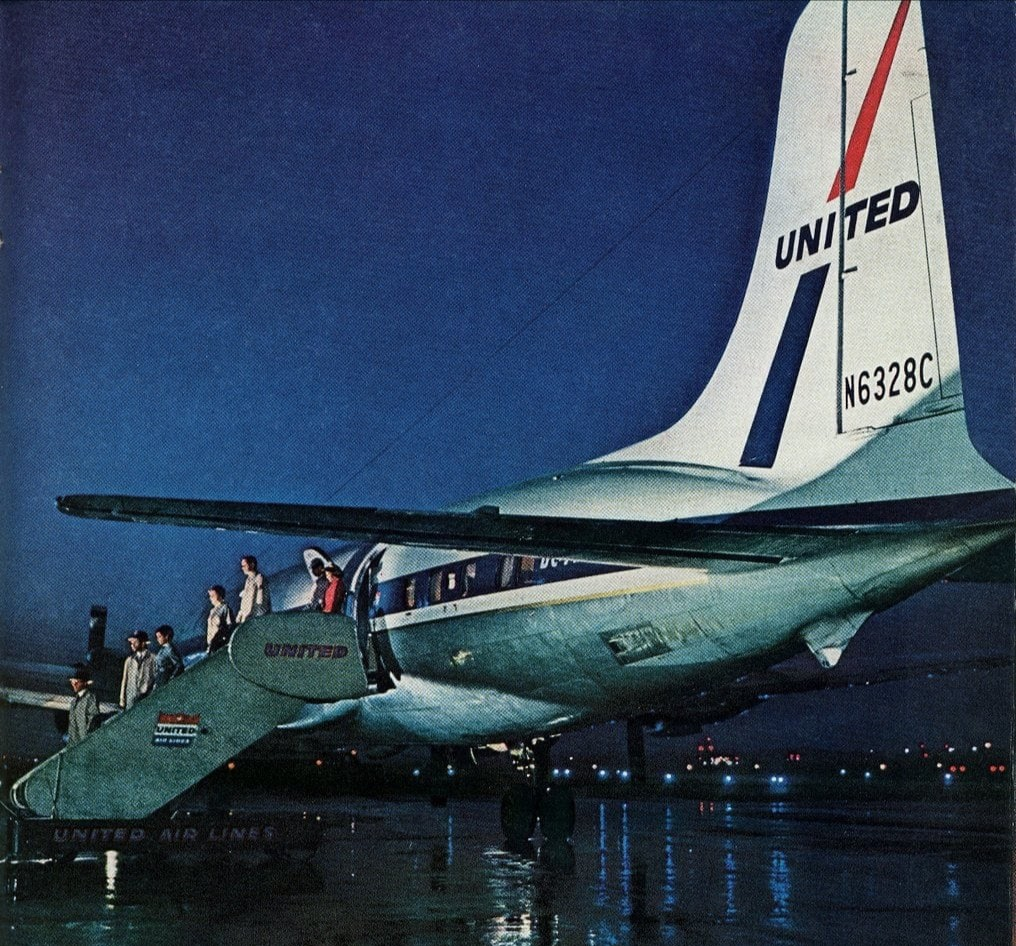
- N6328C, the Douglas DC-7 involved in the collision
- Type: Douglas DC-7
- Operator: United Air Lines
- IATA flight No.: UA736
- ICAO flight No.: UAL736
- Call sign: UNITED 736
- Registration: N6328C
- Flight origin: Los Angeles International Airport, California, United States
- 1st stopover: Stapleton International Airport, Denver, Colorado, United States
- 2nd stopover: Mid-Continent International Airport, Kansas City, Missouri, United States
- Last stopover: Washington National Airport, Washington, D.C., United States
- Destination: Idlewild Airport, New York City, United States
- Occupants: 47
- Passengers: 42
- Crew: 5
- Fatalities: 47
- Survivors: 0

Second aircraft
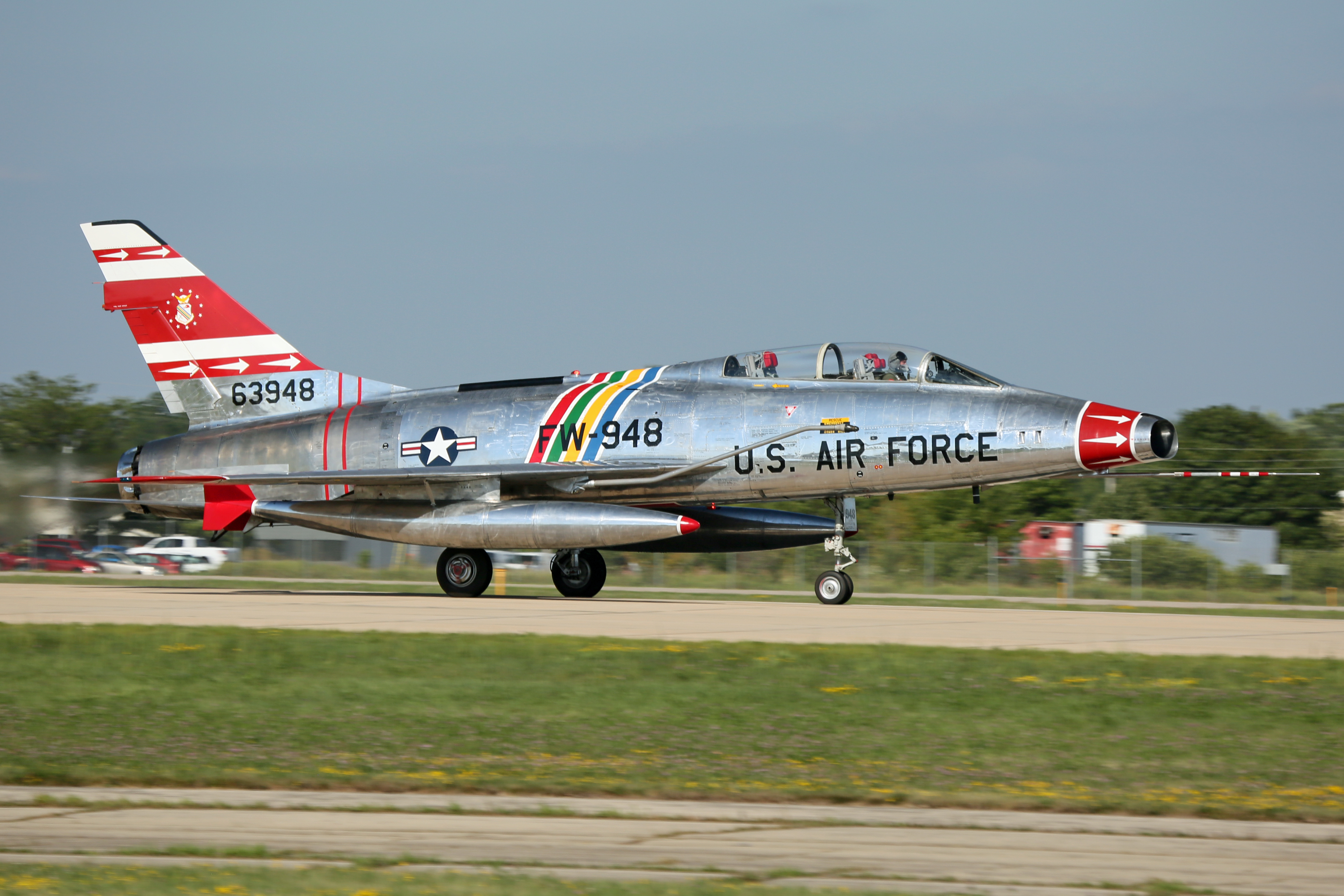
- A North American F-100F-5-NA Super Sabre, similar to the one involved in the collision
- Type: North American F-100F-5-NA Super Sabre
- Operator: United States Air Force
- Call sign: Sabre 7-5-5
- Registration: 56-3755
- Flight origin: Nellis Air Force Base, Nevada
- Destination: Nellis Air Force Base
- Occupants: 2
- Crew: 2
- Fatalities: 2
- Survivors: 0

United Air Lines Flight 736 was a scheduled American transcontinental passenger service flown daily by United Airlines between Los Angeles and New York City. On April 21, 1958, the airliner assigned to the flight, a Douglas DC-7 with 47 on board, was flying over Clark County, Nevada in clear weather when it was involved in a daytime mid-air collision with a United States Air Force fighter jet crewed by two pilots. Both aircraft fell out of control from 21,000 feet (6,400 m) and crashed into unpopulated desert terrain southwest of Las Vegas, leaving no survivors. The loss of Flight 736, one of a series of 1950s mid-air collisions involving passenger aircraft in American skies, helped usher-in widespread improvements in air traffic control within the United States, and led to a sweeping reorganization of federal government aviation authorities.

Among the DC-7 passengers were a group of military personnel and civilian contractors involved with sensitive Department of Defense weapons systems. Their deaths triggered new rules prohibiting similar groups engaged in critical projects from flying aboard the same aircraft.

The official investigation report cited cockpit visibility limitations and high closure speeds as contributing to the accident. While the report did not assign blame for the collision to either flight crew, it faulted military and civilian aviation authorities for not reducing well-known collision risks that had existed for over a year within the confines of airways, even after numerous complaints from airline crews.

A series of lawsuits were filed following the collision. In one case a judge stated the Air Force pilots did not use "ordinary care" in operation of the fighter jet, and should have yielded the right of way to the DC-7 airliner, despite the investigation assigning no blame to either flight crew for the collision. The judge also criticized the Air Force for not coordinating their training flights with civilian traffic, and for failing to schedule their flights to minimize traffic congestion. In another case, a settlement was reached where the U.S. Government paid United Airlines $1.45 million in compensation.

== Events leading to the accident ==
The Flight 736 aircraft was a four-engine DC-7 propliner that entered the United Airlines fleet in early 1957, registered as N6328C. On April 21, 1958, it departed Los Angeles International Airport at 7:37 a.m. on a scheduled transcontinental flight to New York City, with stopovers in Denver, Kansas City, and Washington, D.C. The flight crew were Captain Duane Mason Ward, age 44, First Officer Arlin Edward Sommers, 36, and Flight Engineer Charles E. Woods, 43. Of the 42 passengers on the flight, seven were military personnel and 35 were civilians. (Note: Two of the passengers had involvement with tracking and controlling air traffic. Jack R. Fedrick was a partner of the electronics firm Fenske, Fedrick and Miller that had built and patented a display device (the Iconorama) to enable air traffic control centers to see positions of all aircraft in their control areas on a large display panel. Fedrick was on his way to Colorado to discuss the Iconorama with the Air Force, and the Civil Aeronautics Authority (CAA) was also showing interest. Fellow passenger W. E. (Ed) Nollenberger was the supervisor of the CAA Air Traffic Division 4, encompassing 11 western states. Four months after Nollenberger's death, the CAA was legislated out of existence, due in part to the crash of the plane he died in.)

Soon after taking off, the airliner was directed about 50 miles (43 nmi; 80 km) east through controlled airspace to a waypoint over Ontario, California, where a turn to the northeast towards Las Vegas allowed it to merge with the "Victor 8" airway. (Note: "Victor 8 airway was a major transcontinental airway established by the CAA in 1952 and was used extensively by air traffic including large passenger airliners such as United's DC-7. Victor 8 airway includes the navigable air space up to an elevation of 27,000 feet (8,200 m) mean sea level above the earth's surface within five statute miles of each side of a prescribed center line. It extends from Long Beach, California, to Washington, D. C., and passes over Las Vegas, Nevada. It was common knowledge that Victor 8 was a regular route for two-way traffic at the time of the accident." – Verbatim from: United Airlines v. Wiener, 335 F.2d 379, para. 7, U.S. Court of Appeals for the Ninth Circuit, June 24, 1964) The United Airlines crew–using radio call sign "United 7-3-6"–flew the DC-7 under instrument flight rules (IFR), controlled by Civil Aeronautics Authority (CAA) ground stations, at an authorized cruise altitude of 21,000 feet toward the first stopover at Denver.

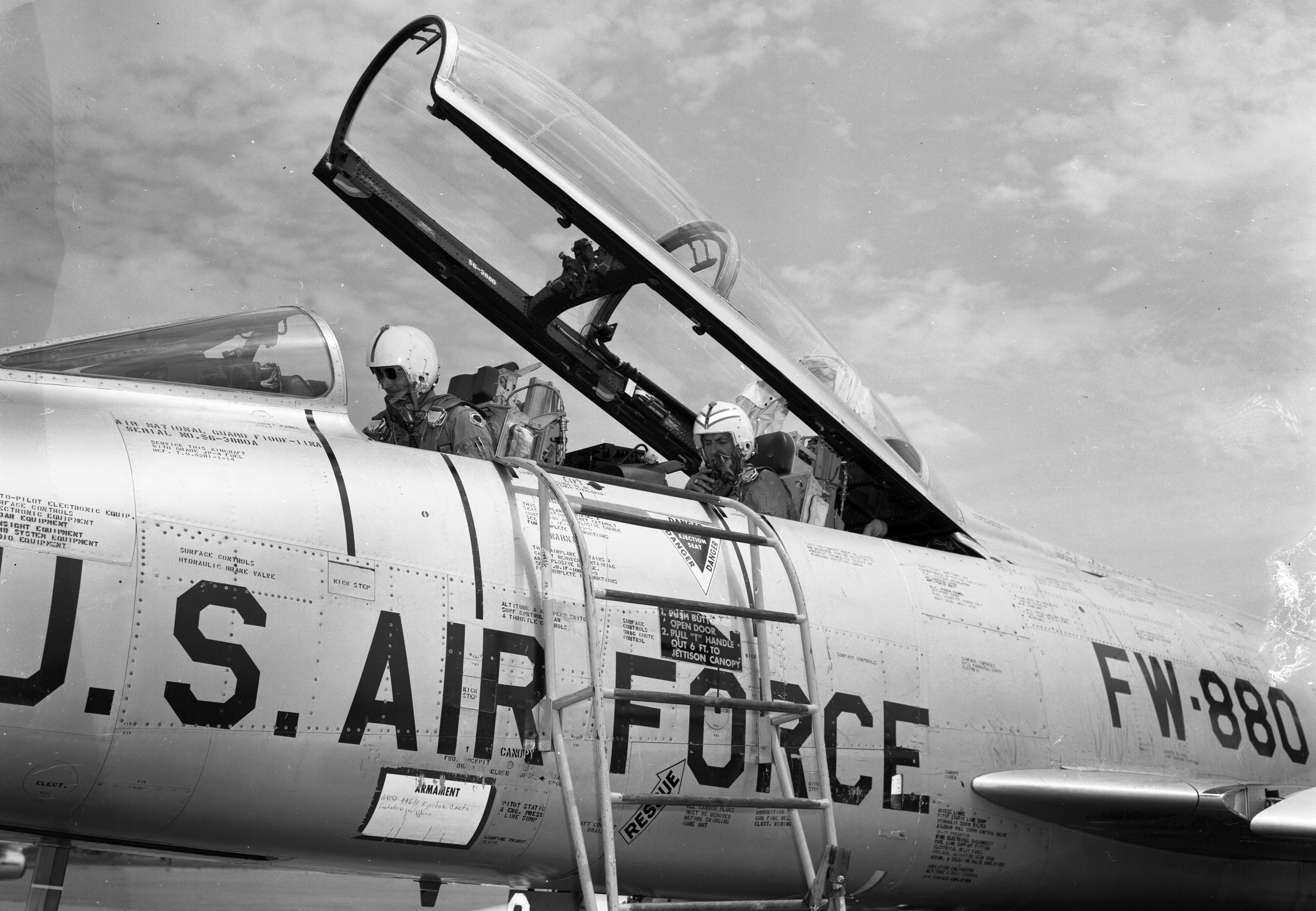
F-100F fighter with two tandem-seated pilots

Approximately eight minutes after the DC-7 departed Los Angeles, a U.S. Air Force F-100F-5-NA Super Sabre jet fighter, serial number 56–3755, took off from Nellis Air Force Base near Las Vegas at 7:45 a.m. on a training flight with two pilots on board. In the front seat of the tandem cockpit was flight instructor and safety pilot Captain Thomas Norman Coryell, 28. Behind him was his trainee, First Lieutenant Jerald Duane Moran (misnamed Gerald in early reports), 23. As part of his IFR training, Moran would spend the flight under a sliding hood that blocked his view outside the aircraft, but allowed him to see his instrument panel. The purpose of the hood was to force the trainee pilot to fly using instruments alone, simulating flight in darkness or in clouds which can deprive a pilot of external visual clues.

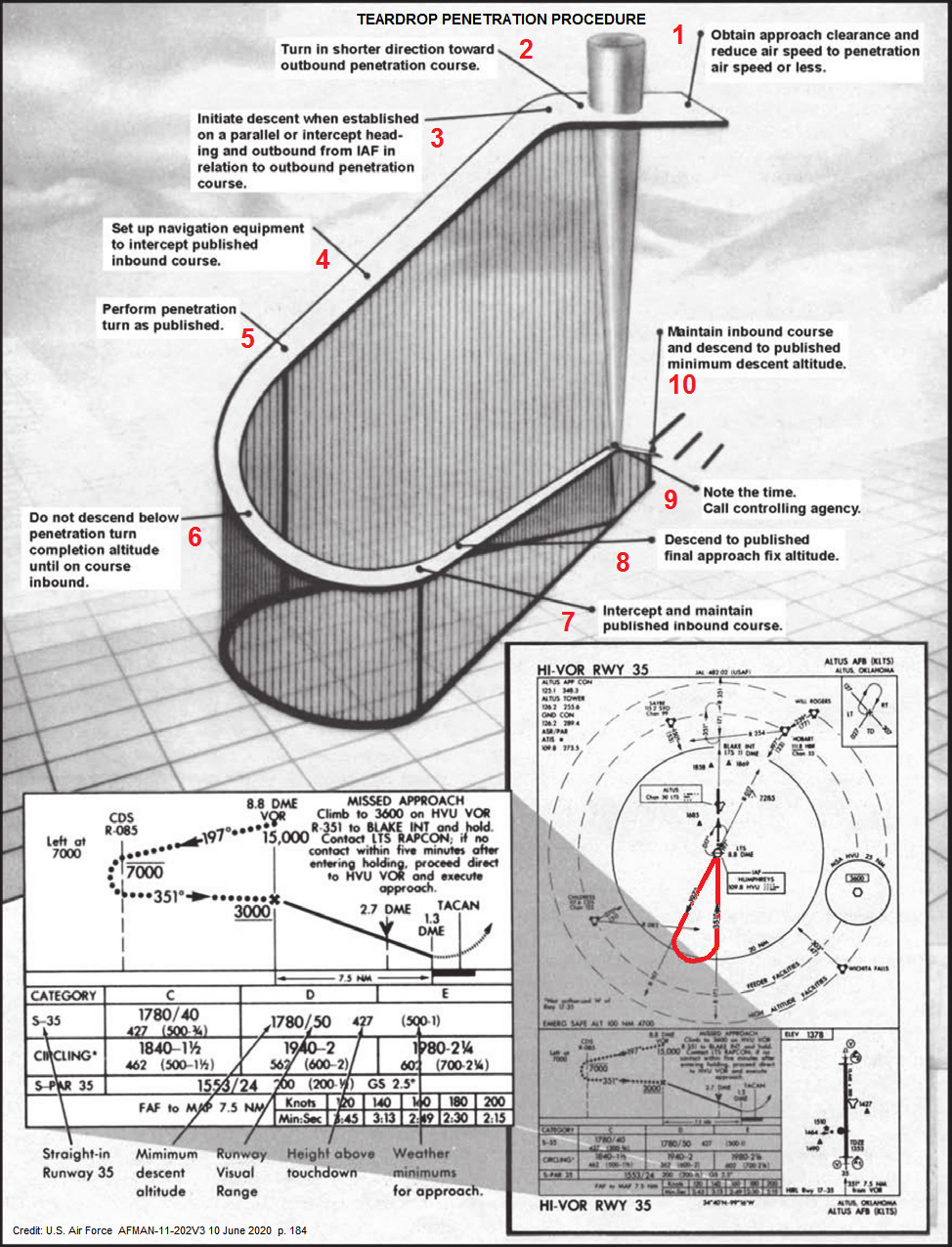
The duties of the front-seat pilot were to maintain a lookout for other aircraft while instructing and monitoring the performance of the trainee in the rear seat. The F-100F had dual pilot controls that allowed the instructor at any time to take over flying the jet. Part of the training flight involved a descent and approach to Nellis Air Force Base from an altitude of 28,000 feet (8,500 m), with an extended speed brake, under simulated instrument meteorological conditions (IMC). The descent was to follow a "teardrop pattern," with the Las Vegas commercial radio station KRAM as the navigational fix, a process the Air Force called the "KRAM procedure." (Note: Example teardrop penetration flight path; the narrow vertical cone would represent air space directly above the KRAM radio tower. Note that in the KRAM procedure, an aircraft used a descending right turn, not the left turn in this example. "The KRAM procedure was designed by the command of the Nellis Air Force Base as a procedure to descend from an altitude of 20,000 feet (6,100 m) or above to an altitude of 6,000 feet (1,800 m), using as a 'fix' for initiating and concluding the penetration a commercial broadcast radio station (KRAM) located within the boundaries of Civil Airway Victor 8. The procedure prescribed that the Nellis jets, on approaching KRAM, get a clearance for the KRAM penetration from Nellis VFR Control, cross KRAM at 20,000 feet (6,100 m) or above, descend on a magnetic track of 170 degrees at 300 knots (350 mph; 560 km/h) indicated air speed (approximately the equivalent of 430 knots (490 mph; 800 km/h) true or actual air speed under the atmospheric conditions prevailing on the morning of April 21, 1958 at 21,000 feet (6,400 m)) to an altitude of 11,000 feet (3,400 m) within 16 nautical miles (18 mi; 30 km) of KRAM. Upon reaching 11,000 feet (3,400 m) on a magnetic track of 170 degrees, the procedure prescribed a right turn of 1 1/2 degrees per second and a bank of 30 degrees, and a crossing of the KRAM station at an altitude of 6,000 feet (1,800 m). During the descent it was prescribed that the speed brakes be extended. This procedure is commonly termed a "teardrop penetration" and derives its name from the fact that the path of the plane executing the procedure, if drawn on the earth, would resemble the shape of a teardrop." – Verbatim from: United States v. Sommers, 351 F.2d 354, note 2, U.S. Court of Appeals for the Tenth Circuit, September 30, 1965) The prescribed descent angle for the KRAM procedure was about five degrees.

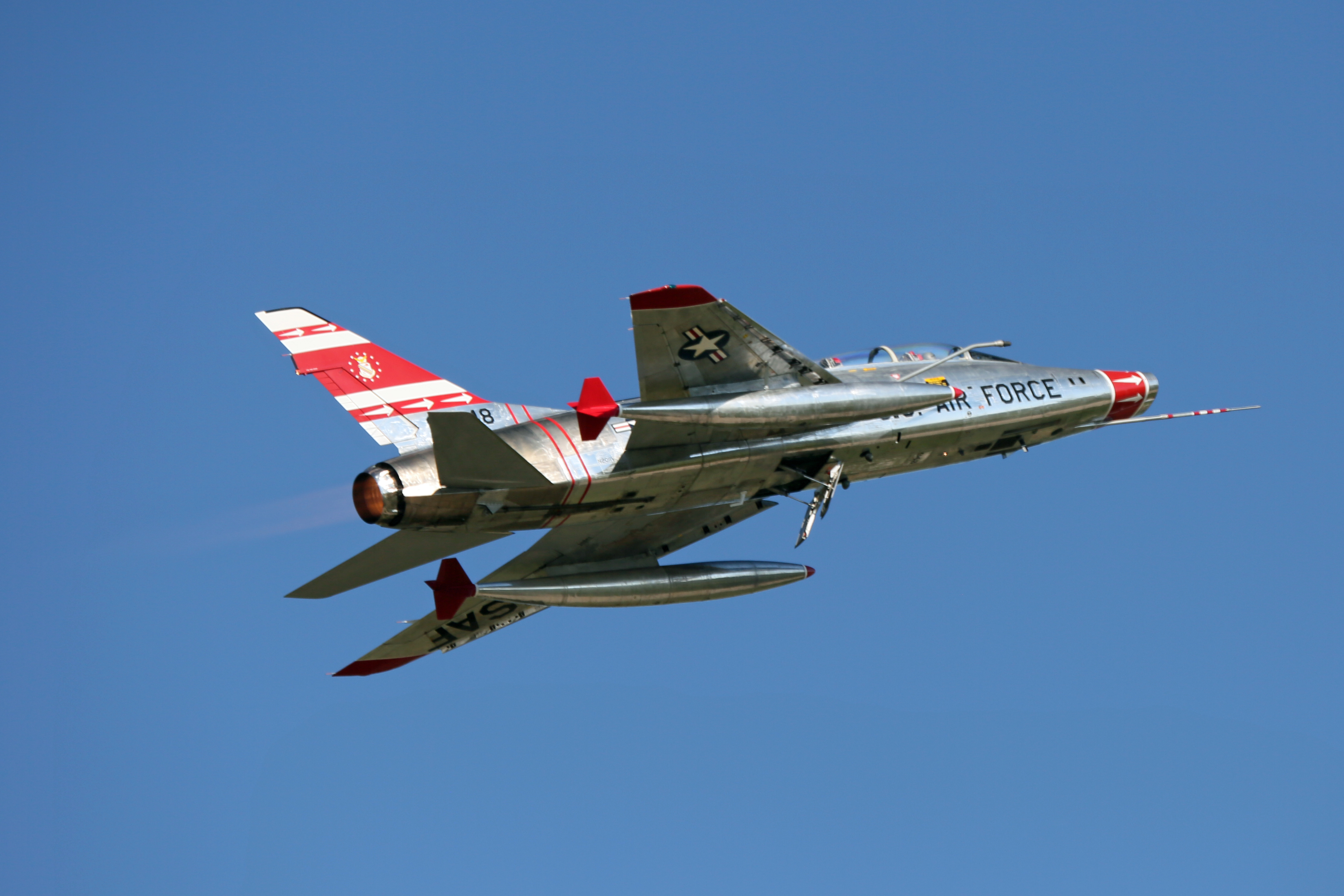
F-100F in a similar bank angle to that prescribed in the KRAM procedure teardrop turn; note extended speed brake

At about 8:14 a.m. CAA controllers received a routine position report from Flight 736 while it was flying over a navigational radio beacon east of Daggett, California; the report estimated an 8:31 a.m. arrival time over McCarran Field near Las Vegas. At 8:28 a.m. the F-100F crew requested and received clearance from the military controller at Nellis Air Force Base to begin a procedural "jet penetration" descent to 14,000 feet (4,300 m). As the fighter descended in a southerly direction, the airliner was approaching Las Vegas air space at about 312 knots (359 mph; 578 km/h) on a north-northeasterly heading of 23 degrees, flying straight and level within the confines of its designated "Victor 8" airway. The CAA stations controlling the airliner were unaware of the fighter jet; the Air Force controller at Nellis Air Force Base directing the jet was unaware of the airliner.

== Collision ==
Los Angeles Times front page for April 22, 1958. Flight 736 articles appeared on pages 1–7.

At 8:30 a.m., in clear weather with excellent visibility of over 35 miles (30 nmi; 56 km), the flight paths of the two aircraft intersected about 9 miles (7.8 nmi; 14 km) southwest of Las Vegas. The converging aircraft collided nearly head-on at an altitude of 21,000 feet (6,400 m) at an estimated closure speed of 665 knots (765 mph; 1,232 km/h).

The descending Air Force jet, flying at 444 knots (511 mph; 822 km/h), had sliced through the airliner's right wing with its own right wing, immediately sending both aircraft out of control. At the moment of collision the F-100F was in a 90 degree bank to the left at a down angle of approximately 15 to 17 degrees. One eyewitness to the collision said the wings of the F-100F "dipped" about two seconds before the collision; another eyewitness said that just before the impact, the fighter "swooped down." The witness descriptions and the extreme 90 degree bank of the fighter jet—far more than the 30 degrees outlined in the KRAM procedure—indicate an unsuccessful last-second evasive action by the Air Force crew.

Moments after the two planes collided, the only mayday distress call radioed by the United Airlines crew was heard at 8:30 a.m. plus 20 seconds. The message as recorded by a ground station was "United 736, Mayday, mid-air collision, over Las Vegas." The crippled airliner—now missing about eight feet (2.4 m) of its right wing—trailed black smoke and flames as it spiraled earthward in an unrecoverable spin. The high aerodynamic forces resulting from the spin exceeded the DC-7's stress limits, causing the engines to be wrenched from their mounts, and seconds later the remainder of the aircraft began breaking apart. The airliner and its associated debris fell onto a then-empty patch of desert outside the town of Arden, in what is now the unincorporated town of Enterprise, about 2.6 miles (2.3 nmi; 4.2 km) northeast of the estimated collision location. The nearly vertical descent and subsequent explosion made the crash unsurvivable.

The fighter jet—its right wing and right tailplane torn away by the collision—left a trail of fragments as it arced steeply downward, rolling as it fell. One of the Air Force pilots called out an unrecorded mayday message that was eventually determined to be "Mayday, Mayday, this is seven-five-five, we're bailing out". (Note: The unrecorded mayday message was heard by a ground controller and by the crew of another F-100F nearby. Those who heard it agreed that the first part of the message was "Mayday, Mayday, this is seven-five-five" (the call sign). The remainder of the message was initially interpreted as either "we're bailing out" or "we've had a flameout", but a subsequent investigation concluded the engine was functioning until it impacted the ground, ruling out the flameout interpretation.) The out-of-control jet crashed into a hilly area of uninhabited desert, 5.4 miles (4.7 nmi; 8.7 km) SSW of the DC-7 crash site. At least one of the Air Force pilots was still in the jet when it hit the ground, but contemporary news reports differ on whether the other pilot attempted an unsuccessful low-altitude ejection, or stayed with the jet all the way to the ground. Witnesses reported seeing a parachute drifting away from the falling F-100F, leading to the hope that a pilot had ejected, but when the parachute was located it was determined to be a detached drag parachute that normally would be used to help the fighter slow down shortly after landing.

== Investigations ==
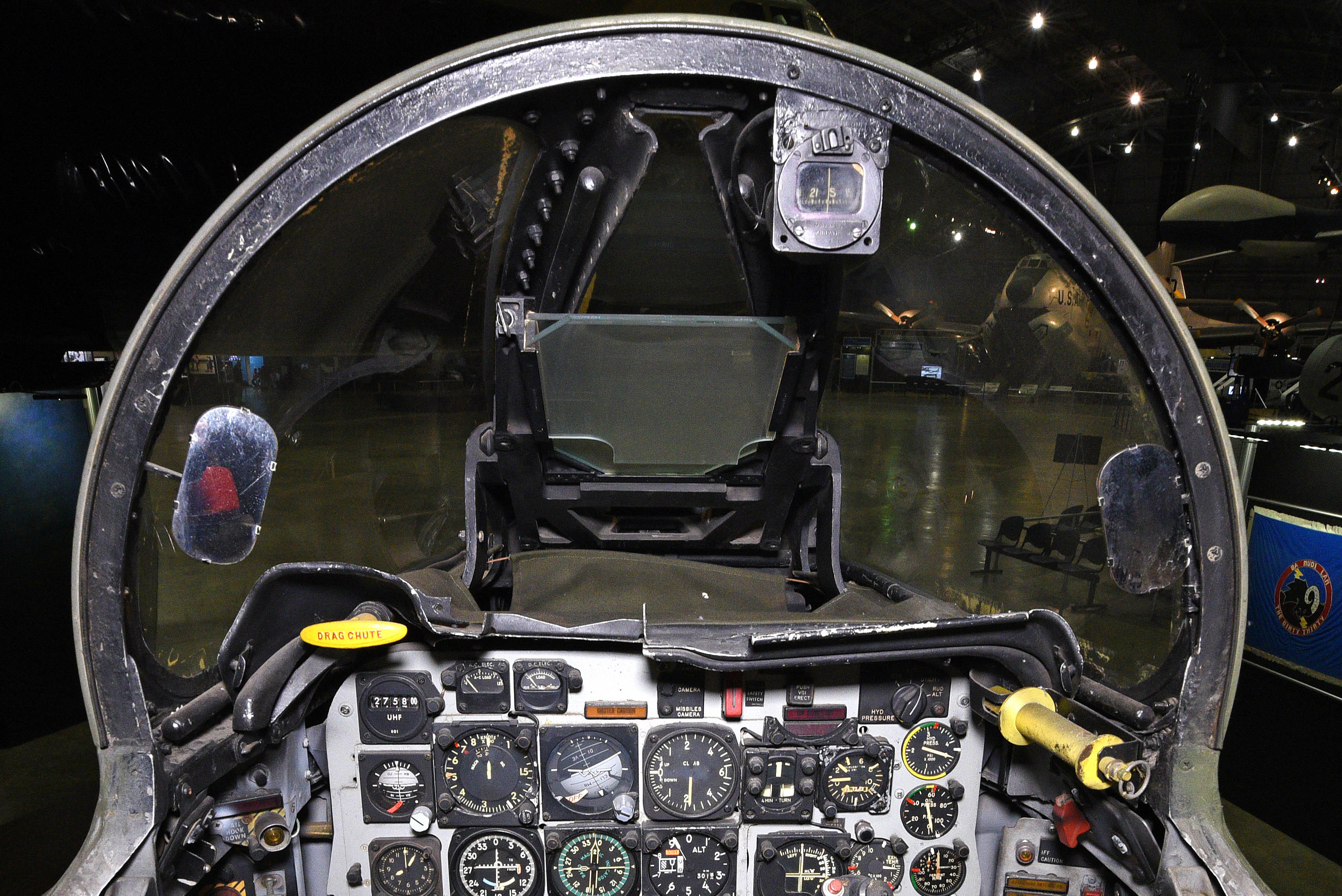
F-100F front cockpit view; the curved metal canopy support ring interfered with viewing the oncoming DC-7

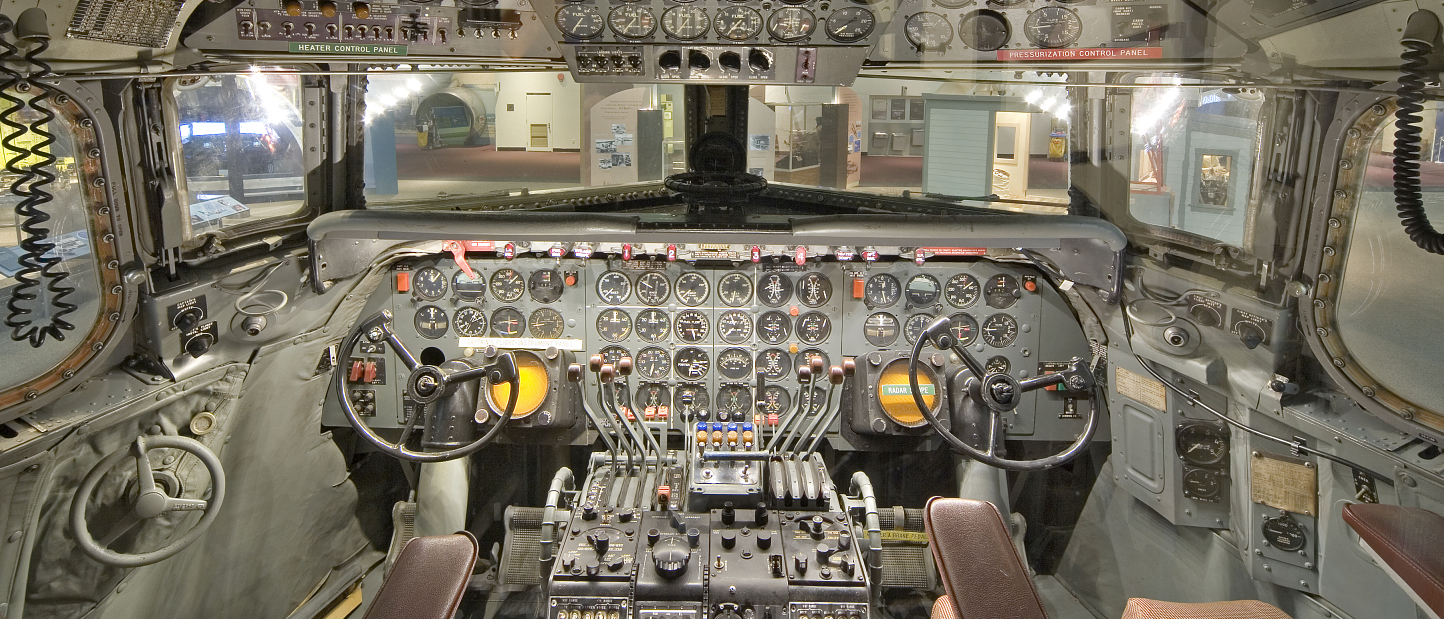
DC-7 cockpit; a windshield pillar may have obscured the oncoming F-100F

At the request of the local sheriff and United Airlines, the Federal Bureau of Investigation sent fingerprint experts to help identify the human remains. Among the dead were 13 civilian and military managers, engineers and technicians assigned to the American ballistic missile program. Five of that group were civilian contractors attached to the missile program at Norton Air Force Base; they were en route to conferences at the headquarters of the Strategic Air Command at Offutt Air Force Base. Articles in the Las Vegas Review-Journal commemorating the 40th and 50th anniversaries of the crash reported the FBI search went beyond fingerprint matching for identification; the agents were also looking for any surviving sensitive papers relating to national security the group of military contractors had carried on board in handcuffed briefcases. The same reports also said the crash prompted the military and defense industry to adopt rules to keep groups of technical people involved in the same critical project from travelling together on the same plane.

Investigators from the Civil Aeronautics Board (CAB) conducted an accident analysis, and four months after the collision released a report on August 19, 1958. (Note: There were three separate official investigations; one conducted by the CAB, and two by the Air Force. Records for the Air Force investigations have not been found online; as a result their findings have not been included.) The report ruled out the weather conditions and the airworthiness of the two planes as factors in the collision. The report stated the probable cause was the high rate of near head-on closure, and that at high altitude, there were human and cockpit limitations involved. The CAB investigation concluded a metal frame support on the F-100's canopy seriously interfered with the Air Force instructor pilot's ability to see the oncoming DC-7, while a supporting pillar on the DC-7's windshield could have prevented the United Airlines captain from sighting the fighter until it was too late to react; however, the report noted the view of the fighter from the airliner's copilot position was not obstructed by any supporting pillar.

The CAB report did not assign blame to either flight crew for the accident, but faulted authorities at the CAA and Nellis Air Force Base for failing to take measures to reduce a known collision exposure; training exercises were allowed to be conducted for more than a year prior to the collision within the confines of several airways, even after numerous near-misses with military jets had been reported by airline crews. The CAB acknowledged that the Air Force, following the accident, took numerous steps to reduce the collision exposure on the airway structure in the Las Vegas area. The report also stated the CAA started a civil-military coordination program, including a review of jet penetrations on a national scale.

== Legacy ==
"There is so much room up there, it would seem all but impossible for two planes to come together at the same spot at the same time. Yet it has happened again ... The Las Vegas crash provides grim emphasis to the argument vigorously pressed by the Deseret News last year, that all military student-training flights be performed out of bounds of commercial airways."

— The Deseret News (editorial commentary), April 22, 1958

"There was no contact between the control tower at Nellis Air Force Base and the control tower of the CAA at Las Vegas airport, although they were only six miles apart ... One-half of the air traffic of the nation is military, the other half is civilian: and the right hand doesn't know what the left hand is doing. Such a situation is almost as dangerous as a busy intersection at which the red lights [are] supervised by one agency and the green lights by another."

— Senator A.S. "Mike" Monroney, Congressional Record, May 1, 1958

From June 1956 to May 1958—beginning with the high-profile Grand Canyon disaster and concluding with the loss of Capital Airlines Flight 300—in just under two years a total of 245 military and civilian people died in a series of five major United States mid-air collisions involving at least one passenger transport aircraft. (Note: Two years prior to the loss of Flight 736, 128 died in the 1956 Grand Canyon mid-air collision between a United Airlines DC-7 and a Trans World Airlines (TWA) Super Constellation airliner. An additional 56 people died during two more major collisions; one in January 1957 near Pacoima, California and one in February 1958 over Norwalk, California. Adding the 49 deaths from the Flight 736 collision—and 12 more fatalities from a civilian/military mid-air collision over Maryland (Capital Airlines Flight 300) the following month—resulted in a combined loss of 245 military and civilian lives from those five collisions.) After each collision more momentum would build to improve the way commercial and military flights were controlled in the United States, with pressure building from the public, the media, and from concerned airline pilots who openly talked about how maneuvering military jets would fly into busy civilian airways without warning.

In an editorial published just after the collision, Aviation Week magazine called the loss of Flight 736 "another ghastly exclamation point in the sad story of how the speed and numbers of modern aircraft have badly outrun the mechanical and administrative machinery of air traffic control." The editorial also reminded the reader that a series of Aviation Week editorials in late 1955 warned of the consequences of the failure to take drastic and immediate action.

Coincidently, the Flight 736 disaster occurred as a CAB hearing on the feasibility of expanding controlled airways was underway in Washington, D.C., and it had a major impact on the hearing proceedings. The collision happened at 11:30 a.m. Eastern time, and early word about the extent of the disaster spread while the hearing was on a lunch break. Only 15 minutes after the hearing deliberations resumed in the afternoon, the CAB approved—on an experimental basis—an already-discussed proposal barring all aircraft lacking specific clearance from entering specifically set-aside airspace. All aircraft operating in the designated space would have to be equipped for instrument flight operations.

According to the CAB there had been 159 mid-air collisions in the years 1947–1957, and 971 near-misses in 1957 alone. The increased speed of aircraft and higher air traffic density made it harder to give pilots enough time to spot each other during flights. Therefore, the CAB said, "it is essential that positive control be extended to altitudes at 35,000 feet (11,000 m) and on additional routes as rapidly as practical." At the time such control only existed between 17,000 and 22,000 feet (5,200 and 6,700 m) on certain transcontinental airways.

The April 28, 1958 issue of Aviation Week reported the CAB admitted it would be "several years, at least" before an all-weather control plan could be implemented, and quoted the head of the CAB's Bureau of Safety as saying the "lack of men, money and machines" stood in the way of implementing a workable control system, nation-wide.

Following the loss of the two airliners in the April and May 1958 collisions, a congressional committee from the U.S. House of Representatives—concerned about the lack of coordination between civil and military air traffic controllers—imposed a 60-day deadline on the CAB and the Air Force to establish new control procedures. The committee also said that eventually a single civil agency should be given the power to regulate all air space for all types of aircraft. Furthermore, the committee stated military flying should be controlled in the vicinity of airways not only in instrument weather, but also in visual conditions.

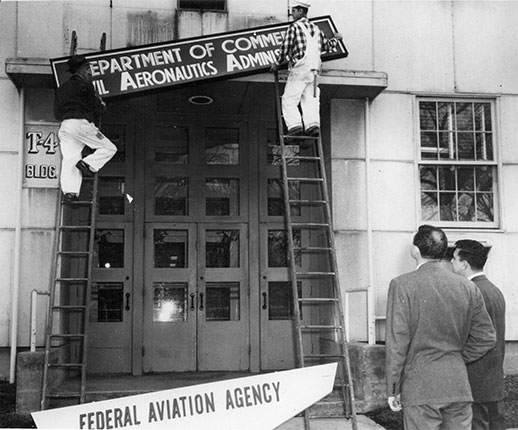
A sign change as the Civil Aeronautics Administration becomes the Federal Aviation Agency

Four months after the loss of Flight 736, the Federal Aviation Act of 1958 was signed into law. The act dissolved the CAA and created the Federal Aviation Agency (FAA, later renamed Federal Aviation Administration). The FAA was given unprecedented and total authority over the control of American air space, including military activity, and as procedures and air traffic control facilities were modernized, airborne collisions eventually decreased in frequency. The Las Vegas Review-Journal in a 50th anniversary article said the act "specifically referenced the crash of United 736 in ordering the creation of the FAA."

Improved air traffic control procedures did not prevent United Airlines from suffering its third mid-air collision in the space of four years—each time with no survivors from the planes involved—when a United Douglas DC-8 jetliner and a TWA Super Constellation propliner collided over New York City in late 1960. Counting the 134 who died in that collision, the three collisions involving United Airlines in 1956, 1958, and 1960 resulted in 311 deaths.

The destruction of the F-100F in the Flight 736 collision meant it joined a long list of other F-100 crashes; almost 25 percent of the supersonic fighters were lost to accidents. In particular, 1958 was the most costly year, with 47 F-100 pilots killed and 116 of the fighters destroyed, a loss rate averaging almost one every three days.

== Legal aftermath ==
Following the Flight 736 collision, 48 lawsuits seeking damages—spread across twelve U.S. District Courts—were eventually brought against United Airlines, the U.S. Government, or both. In one lawsuit filed in September 1958, United Air Lines used the Federal Tort Claims Act to seek damages against the United States in the U.S. District Court for the District of Delaware. The airline alleged that the United States through its agents in the United States Air Force negligently operated the F-100. The airline initially sought damages of US$3.57 million, then increased the amount to $3.94 million. The United States filed a counterclaim of $6.19 million.

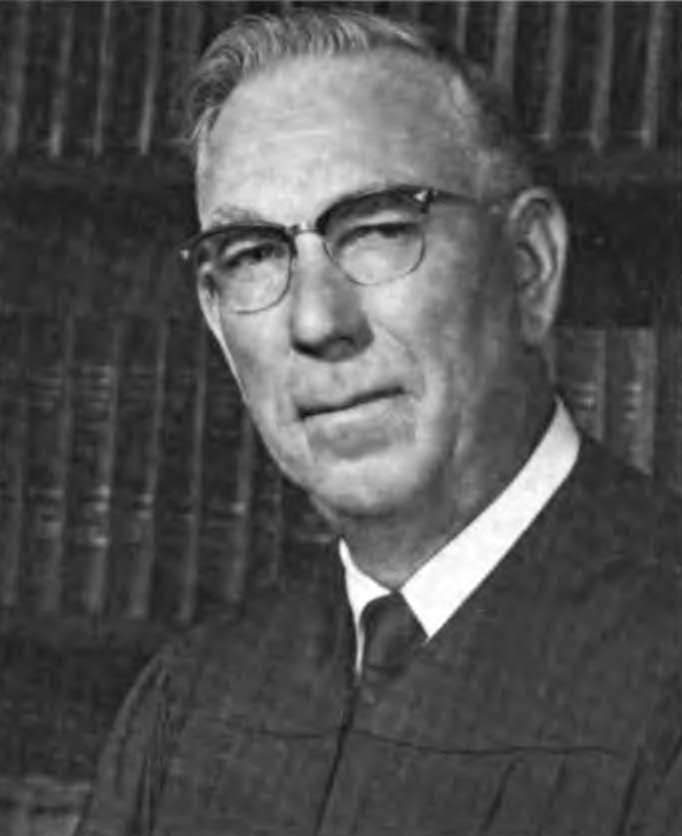
Olin Hatfield Chilson

The court eventually found neither crew was negligent for a failure to see and avoid each other, but held the United States was liable because of other negligence. The case was settled in December 1962 when the United States agreed to pay the airline $1.45 million.

In a judgment in January 1964, surviving relatives of two of the United Airlines crew were awarded a total of $343,200 from the government, with U.S. District Court Judge Olin Hatfield Chilson finding the Air Force pilots did not use "ordinary care" in operation of the fighter jet. Chilson also criticized the Air Force for not coordinating instrument training flights with civilian instrument flight rules traffic, and for failing to schedule flights to minimize traffic congestion. The government appealed, and the relatives cross-appealed to have their damage awards increased, but the earlier 1964 judgment was affirmed in September 1965.

== Crash sites ==
The 49 lives lost in this mid-air collision made it the deadliest aviation incident in the history of the Las Vegas region, but the area has experienced two other major airliner crashes. Movie star Carole Lombard and 21 others died in the mountainside crash of Transcontinental & Western Air (TWA) Flight 3 in 1942, about 16 miles (26 km) WSW of where United Airlines Flight 736 crashed. In 1964, 29 people died when Bonanza Air Lines Flight 114 flew into a hilltop 5 miles (4 nmi; 8 km) SW of the Flight 736 impact site, close to where the F-100F crashed six years earlier.

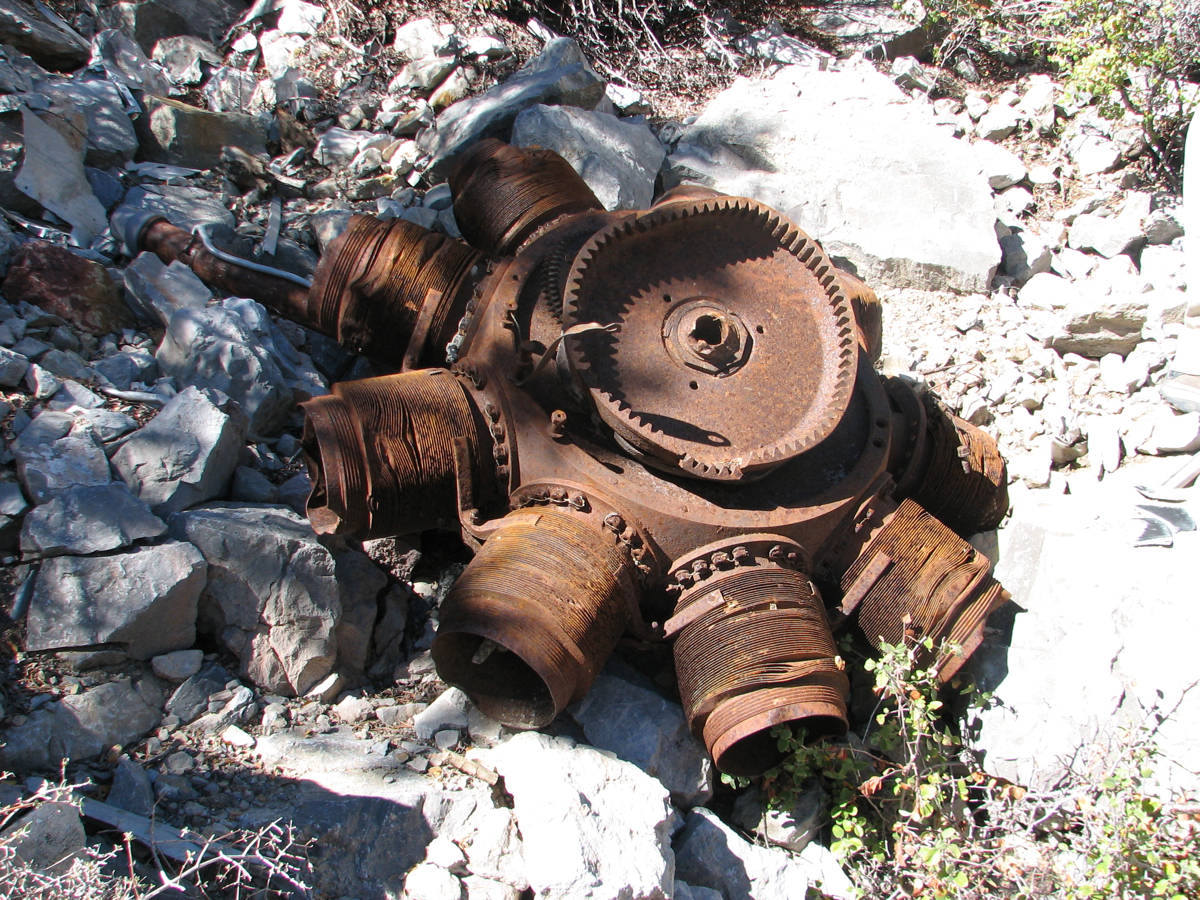
Unrecovered Wright Cyclone radial engine at TWA Flight 3 crash site

At both of those rugged, mountainous sites, salvage efforts removed the more accessible wreckage, but scattered portions of the TWA Douglas DC-3 and Bonanza Air Lines Fairchild F-27 were left behind, including the DC-3's radial engines. The United Airlines DC-7 crash site, however, had been cleared of all but the smallest artifacts due to its generally flat terrain. In 1958 the site was unpopulated desert a mile or more from the nearest paved road, but starting around 1999 it became threatened by encroaching development. Today the spot where the DC-7 crashed is adjacent to the neighborhood of Southern Highlands near the intersection of Decatur Boulevard and Cactus Avenue, amid commercial development. A small engraved metal cross placed in the sandy soil in 1999 by the son of a victim remained the only sign of the loss of United Airlines Flight 736, but preliminary efforts were in motion to encourage public officials to build a permanent memorial to those who died. A brief video produced by the Las Vegas Review-Journal in April 2018 says the site where Flight 736 impacted is now beneath a parking lot, but the metal cross was still standing nearby on a low hill that remained undeveloped.

== See also ==
- 1958 in aviation
- List of accidents and incidents involving military aircraft (1955–1959) – includes eight U.S. military mid-air collisions in 1958
- Separation (aeronautics) – the concept for keeping aircraft safe distances apart
