= M8 =

M8 or M-8 or M.08 or variant, may refer to:

== Computing and electronics ==
- M8 (cipher), an encryption algorithm
- Leica M8, a digital rangefinder camera
- HTC One (M8), a smartphone
- Meizu M8, a smartphone

== Roads and places ==
- Messier 8, also known as M8 or Lagoon Nebula, a giant interstellar cloud
- William L. Whitehurst Field (FAA airport code M08), Bolivar, Hardeman County, Tennessee, USA

=== Rail stations ===
- Meijō Kōen Station (station code M08), Kita, Nagoya, Aichi, Japan
- Senri-Chūō Station (station code M08), Toyonaka, Osaka, Japan
- Tatsue Station (station code M08), Komatsushima, Tokushima, Japan

=== Roads ===
==== South Africa ====
- M8 (Cape Town)
- M8 (Durban)
- M8 (East London)
- M8 (Johannesburg)
- M8 (Port Elizabeth)
- M8 (Pretoria)

==== Elsewhere ====
- M8 motorway (Hungary)
- M8 motorway (Ireland)
- M8 road (Malawi)
- M-8 (Michigan highway), in the Unitied states, also known as the Davison Freeway
- M-8 highway (Montenegro)
- M8 motorway (Pakistan)
- M8 highway (Russia), also known as the Kholmogory Highway
- M8 motorway (Scotland)
- M8 Motorway (Sydney) in Australia
- Highway M08 (Ukraine)
- M8 road (Zambia)
- Western Freeway (Victoria) in Australia, designated M8

== Civilian transportation ==
=== Road transport ===
- M8 (New York City bus), a New York City Bus route in Manhattan
- AITO M8, an electric SUV
- BMW M8, a sports car from BMW 8 Series
- GAC M8 or Trumpchi M8, a minivan
- Mercedes-Benz M08 engine, a straight-8 engine
- Haima M8, a sedan

=== Rail transport ===
- Paris Metro Line 8, a rapid transit rail line in Paris
- M8 (Istanbul Metro), a rapid transit rail line in Istanbul, Turkey
- M8 (railcar), a Metro-North Railroad car
- Sri Lanka Railways M8, diesel-electric locomotives

== Military ==
- M8 carbine, a carbine version of the M7 rifle
- M8 flamethrower
- M8 Grenade Launcher, see M7 grenade launcher

=== Aircraft ===
- Loening M-8, a 1910s American fighter monoplane
- Miles M.8 Peregrine, a 1930s twin-engined light transport monoplane primarily used by the Royal Aircraft Establishment

=== Land vehicles ===
- M8 armored gun system, a US Army light tank cancelled in 1996
- M8 Greyhound, an American armored car used during World War II
- M8 tractor, an artillery tractor used by the US Army
- Howitzer motor carriage M8, an American self-propelled howitzer vehicle developed during World War II

=== Rockets ===
- M8 (rocket), an American World War II air-to-surface and surface-to-surface rocket
- M-8 rocket, a variant of the RS-82 rocket used by the Soviet Union in World War II

== Other uses ==
- M8, a standard bolt and nut size in the ISO metric screw thread system
- M8 Alliance, World Health Summit
- M8 (magazine), a dance music magazine based in Scotland
- M8, Internet slang for "mate"
- M8, a difficulty grade in mixed climbing

== See also ==
- Yamaha MO8 music synthesizer
- 8M (disambiguation)
- Mate (disambiguation) ("m8" in texting spelling)
- M (disambiguation)
- 8 (disambiguation)
- Model 8 (disambiguation)
