= Number Eight =

Number Eight may refer to:

- 8 (number), the natural number
- 8 (J.J. Cale album) by the American singer-songwriter and musician
- Number 8, Pershore, community arts centre in England, United Kingdom
- Number Eight (Battlestar Galactica), a character from the 2003 version of the television series Battlestar Galactica
- Number Eight, a character in the episode "The Chimes of Big Ben" from the television series The Prisoner
- #8, the pseudonym of American musician Corey Taylor, when performing with Slipknot
- Number eight (rugby union), a rugby union position
- The Rifle, No 8 .22 cadet rifle used by UK Cadet Forces
- The Pawnshop No. 8, a 2003 Taiwanese television series
- Kaiju No. 8, a 2020 Japanese manga and 2024 anime series

== See also ==
- 8 (disambiguation)
