= 8/1 =

8/1 may refer to:

- August 1 (month-day date notation)
- January 8 (day-month date notation)

== See also ==
- 8 (disambiguation)
