= Crazy Eights (disambiguation) =

Crazy Eights is a card game for two to seven players.

Crazy Eights may also refer to:

- Crazy 8 (store), chain of retail stores operated by Gymboree
- Crazy 8s (band), an American band
- Crazy Eights (film) a 2006 horror film
- Crazy8s, a film festival competition in Vancouver
- CSX 8888 incident, a runaway train in Ohio, USA
- Crazy Eight, gang of boys in the novel Spud
- Crazy 8, a villain and enemy of Spider-Man (Gerry Drew)
- Crazy eight, a variation of eight-ball pool
- Crazy Eights (or Crazy 8ths), a divergent Design Sprint thinking method
- Crazy 8, an item in Mario Kart 8 which carries eight items at once
- The Crazy Eight, nickname for 8th Infantry Division (United States)
- The Crazy Eights, nickname for 8th Canadian Hussars (Princess Louise's)
- Domingo Gallardo "Krazy-8" Molina, the main antagonist of the first half of Season One on Breaking Bad. He also appears on Better Call Saul.

== See also ==
- 8S (disambiguation)
- Crazy (disambiguation)
- Eights (disambiguation)
