= 8M =

8M or 8-M may refer to:

- 8 m, or 8 metres
- Maxair (aviation), IATA code
- Myanmar Airways International, IATA code
- Grigorovich M-8, a variation of the Grigorovich M-5
- GCR Class 8M, a class of British 2-8-0 steam locomotive
- 8M, a model of Bensen B-8
- Smena 8M, a model of Smena (camera)
- VO-8M, see VMA-231
- International Women's Day, shortening of Spanish: 8 de marzo, lit. 'March 8'

== See also ==
- 8 Metre (keelboat)
- M8 (disambiguation)
- M (disambiguation)
- 8 (disambiguation)
