= The Soul Collector =

The Soul Collector may refer to:

- The Soul Collector (1999 film), an American made-for-television romantic fantasy-drama film
- The Soul Collector (2019 film), a South African supernatural thriller film
