= Octet (music) =

Musical group that consists of 8 people

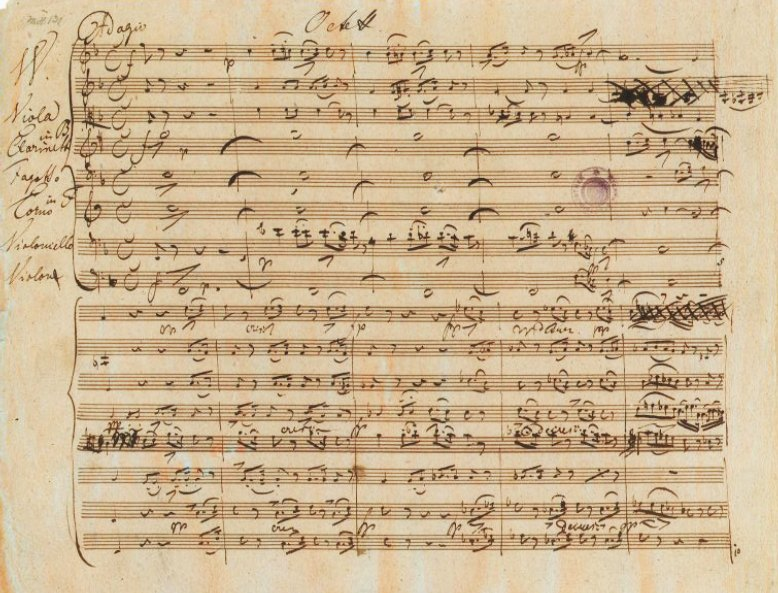
Autograph manuscript score of Schubert’s Octet

In music, an octet is a musical ensemble consisting of eight instruments or voices, or a musical composition written for such an ensemble.

== Octets in classical music ==
Octets in classical music are one of the largest groupings of chamber music. Although eight-part scoring was fairly common for serenades and divertimenti in the 18th century, the word "octet" only first appeared at the beginning of the 19th century, as the title of a composition by Prince Louis Ferdinand of Prussia, whose Octet Op. 12 (published posthumously in 1808) features the piano, together with clarinet, 2 horns, 2 violins, and 2 cellos. Later octets with piano were written by Ferdinand Ries (Op. 128, 1818, with clarinet, horn, bassoon, violin, viola, cello, and double bass), Anton Rubinstein (Op. 9, 1856, with flute, clarinet, horn, violin, viola, cello, and double bass), and Paul Juon (Chamber Symphony, Op. 27, 1907) (Kube 2001).

Octets tend to be scored in one of the following arrangements:

- String octet – This arrangement is made up entirely of strings. Felix Mendelssohn's Octet Op. 20 is an example, as are the octets of George Enescu, Dmitri Shostakovich, Niels Gade, Carl Schuberth, Johan Svendsen, Carl Grädener, Joachim Raff, Woldemar Bargiel, Hermann Graedener, Reinhold Glière, Ferdinand Thieriot, Max Bruch, and Airat Ichmouratov.
  - Double quartet – Double quartets are made up of two string quartets, often arranged antiphonally. Louis Spohr composed four such octets between 1823 and 1847 (opp. 65, 77, 87 and 136), taking as a model a work by Andreas Romberg. Later examples in this mode include works by Nikolay Afanasyev (Housewarming and Le souvenir) and Mario Peragallo (Music for Double Quartet, 1948), as well as Darius Milhaud's paired 14th and 15th String Quartets Op. 291 (1948–49), which are composed to be playable simultaneously as an octet (Kube 2001).
  - Cello octet – Eight cellos, a combination popularized by Heitor Villa-Lobos in his Bachianas Brasileiras nos. 1 (1930) and 5 (1938/1945), though technically these are for "cello orchestra" with a minimum of eight players. Villa-Lobos also arranged three of the preludes and four fugues from Johann Sebastian Bach's Well-Tempered Clavier for this ensemble. Several all-cello groups came into existence during the late 1970s and 1980s, notably the Yale Cellos, the 12 Cellists of the Berlin Philharmonic, and the Conjunto Ibérico cello octet, and their popularity caused a surge of interest in cello-ensemble writing among composers. Some of the most prominent to compose cello octets include Luciano Berio (Korót, 1998), Sylvano Bussotti (Poèsies à Maldoror, 1999), Edison Denisov (Hymne, 1995), Morton Gould (Cellos, 1984), Sofia Gubaidulina (Fata morgana: die tanzende Sonne, 2002), Gordon Jacob (Cello Octet, 1981), Arvo Pärt (version of Fratres, (1983), Steve Reich (Cello Counterpoint, 2003), Kaija Saariaho (Neiges, 1998), and Peter Sculthorpe (Chorale, 1994).
- Wind octet – Usually scored for 2 oboes, 2 clarinets, 2 horns, and 2 bassoons; Wolfgang Amadeus Mozart and Ludwig van Beethoven composed for this scoring, also known as Harmonie (Montagu 2002), though only Beethoven actually titled his one work for this grouping "Octet". The octets of Franz Lachner (Op. 156), Theodore Gouvy (Op. 71) and Carl Reinecke (Op. 216) are scored for flute, oboe, 2 clarinets, 2 horns and 2 bassoons. Igor Stravinsky's Octet for wind instruments has an unusual scoring of flute, clarinet, two bassoons, two trumpets, and two trombones. George Antheil's Concerto for Chamber Orchestra is scored for an octet of flute, oboe, clarinet, bassoon, contrabassoon, horn, trumpet and trombone.
- Wind and string octet – a combination of forces, popularized by Franz Schubert (whose Octet is for clarinet, bassoon, horn, 2 violins, viola, cello, and double bass). A number of ensembles have been formed with this instrumentation, including the Octuor de Paris, for whom Iannis Xenakis composed Anaktoria (1969). By contrast, the Octet by Louis Spohr is scored for clarinet, 2 horns, violin, 2 violas, cello, and double bass. Paul Hindemith wrote a less well-known piece for clarinet, bassoon, horn, violin, two violas, cello and double bass. Another important 20th-century octet for winds and strings is Octandre by Edgard Varèse (1923), for flute (doubling piccolo), oboe, clarinet (doubling E♭ clarinet), bassoon, horn, trumpet, trombone, and double bass (Griffiths 2001). Alec Wilder composed a series of crossover octets between 1938 and 1940 which are scored for a quintet of woodwinds (flute, oboe, clarinet, bass clarinet, bassoon) backed by a rhythm section of harpsichord, double bass and drums.

== Octets in jazz ==
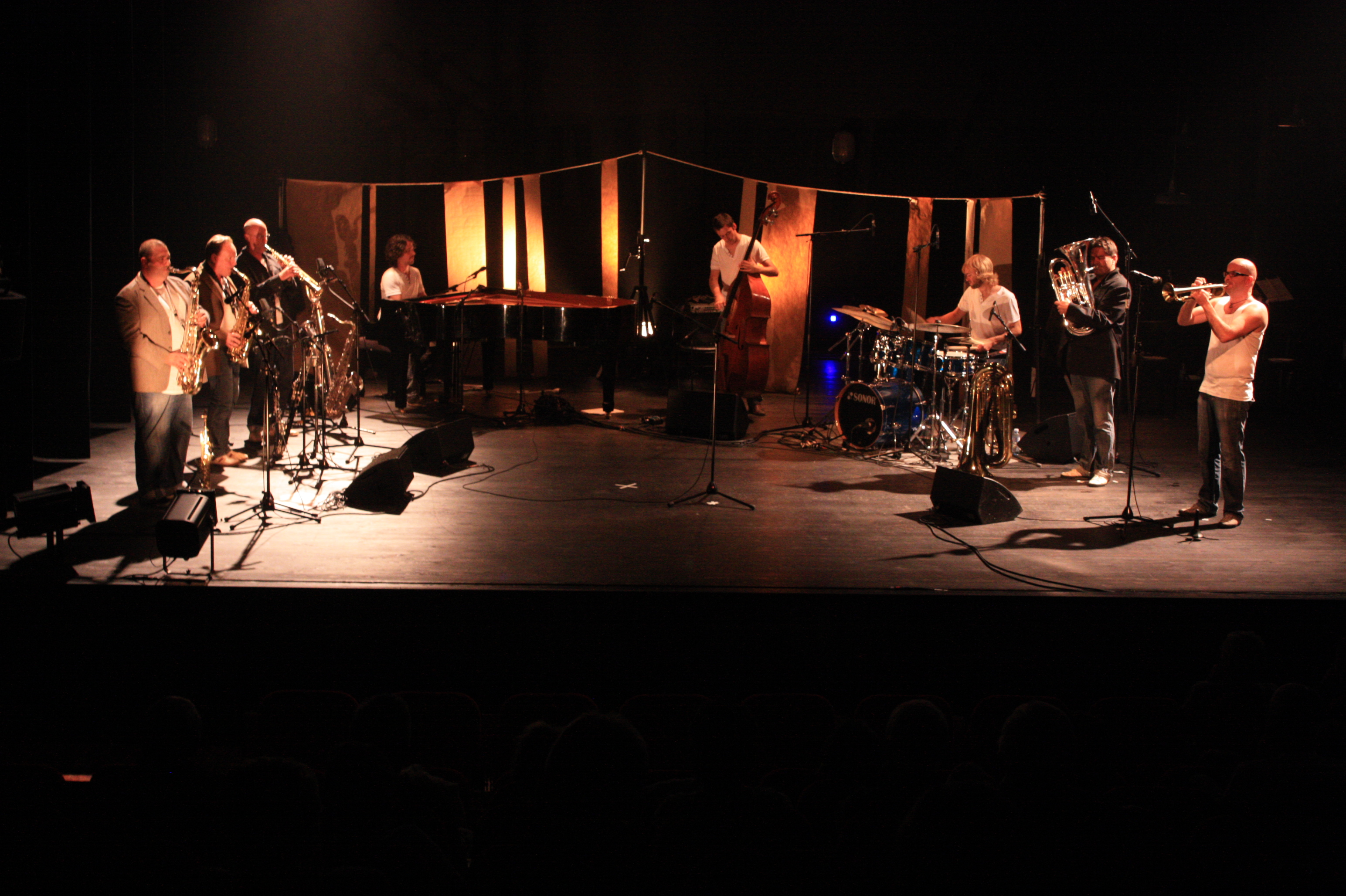
The Aman jazz octet

Jazz ensembles of eight players will frequently be termed an octet. These ensembles may be for any combination of instruments, but the most common line-up is trumpet, alto sax, tenor sax, trombone, guitar, piano, bass and drums, with guitar occasionally making way for another horn, for example baritone sax. Ornette Coleman's ensemble for the Free Jazz album (referred to as a double quartet) is an example of two quartets playing together at the same time.

Saxophonist David Murray leads an experimental jazz octet, the David Murray Octet.

The collaborations of trombonists J.J. Johnson and Kai Winding occasionally featured a trombone octet, most notably on their 1956 record Jay and Kai + 6.

== Octets in popular music ==
- American new wave band Oingo Boingo was an octet for most of its 17-year history, with 5 members in traditional rock music roles (Vocals/Rhythm Guitar, Lead Guitar, Bass, Drums, Keyboard) plus a 3 person horn section.
- British pop group the Dooleys were an eight-member group popular in the late 1970s and early 1980s.
- British rock group Yes were an eight-member group during their Union tour in 1991.

== Vocal octet ==
A vocal octet is a choir, or performance by a choir, of eight separate parts, for example, an SSAATTBB (1st & 2nd soprano, 1st & 2nd alto, 1st & 2nd tenor, baritone and bass) choir.

== See also ==
- Silesian Guitar Octet
- Vocal octet OCTAVA
- Los Angeles Electric 8

== Sources ==
- Griffiths, Paul. 2001. "Varèse, Edgard [Edgar] (Victor Achille Charles)". The New Grove Dictionary of Music and Musicians, second edition, edited by Stanley Sadie and John Tyrrell. London: Macmillan Publishers.
- Kube, Michael. 2001. "Octet". The New Grove Dictionary of Music and Musicians, second edition, edited by Stanley Sadie and John Tyrrell. London: Macmillan Publishers.
- Montagu, Jeremy. 2002. "Octet". In The Oxford Companion to Music, edited by Alison Latham. Oxford and New York: Oxford University Press.
