= Route 8 =

Route 8 may refer to:

- One of several highways - see List of highways numbered 8
- One of several public transport routes - see List of public transport routes numbered 8
