= Model 8 =

Model 8 may refer to:

== Aviation ==
- Bell Model 8 Airacuda, a heavy fighter aircraft
- Boeing Model 8, a biplane aircraft
- Consolidated Model 8, an observation and training airplane
- Convair Model 8, a jet fighter family
- Curtiss Model 8 (HS-1), a flying boat
- Fleet Model 8, a biplane airplane
- Fokker Model 8 Super Universal, a prop-driven airliner
- Lockheed Model 8 Sirius, prop-driven monoplane aircraft
- Luscombe Model 8 Silvaire, high-wing general aviation aeroplane

== Weapons ==
- Model 08 Semi-Automatic Pistol 0.3 Inch, a German WWII service pistol
- Remington Model 8, semiautomatic rifle
- Walther Model 8, single-action pistol

== Other uses ==
- Renault Model 8, a road car

== See also ==
- Model (disambiguation)
- 8 (disambiguation)
- M8 (disambiguation)
