= Figure 8 =

Figure 8, figure of 8, figure eight, or Figure of Eight may refer to:

- 8 (number), in Arabic numerals

== Geography ==
- Figure Eight Island, North Carolina, United States
- Figure Eight Lake, Alberta, Canada
- Figure-Eight Loops, feature of the Historic Columbia River Highway in Guy W. Talbot State Park
- Figure of Eight Island, New Zealand, an island in the Auckland Islands group

== Mathematics and sciences ==
- ∞, symbol meaning infinity
- Figure 8, a two-lobed Lissajous curve
- Figure 8, in topology, the rose with two petals
- Figure 8, shape described by an analemma, a curve in astronomy
- Figure-eight knot (mathematics), in knot theory
- Lemniscate, various types of mathematical curve that resembles a figure 8

== Music ==
=== Albums and EPs ===
- Figure 8 (album), a 2000 album by Elliott Smith
- Figure Eight EP, a 2008 EP by This Et Al

=== Songs ===
- "Figure 8" (song), a 2012 song by Ellie Goulding from Halcyon
- "Figure 8", a song by FKA Twigs from the EP M3LL155X
- "Figure 8", a song by Paramore from the album This Is Why
- "Figure Eight", a song and episode name from the children's educational series Schoolhouse Rock!
- "Figure of Eight" (song), a 1989 song by Paul McCartney
- "Figure of Eight", song by Status Quo from In Search of the Fourth Chord

== Ropes ==
- Figure eight bend or Flemish bend, a knot
- Figure-eight knot, typically used as a stopper knot
- Figure-eight loop, figure of eight knot tied "on the bight"

== Sport and leisure ==
- Figure 8 racing, a category of auto racing related to the demolition derby
- Figure 8 roller coaster, a track design
- Figure 8, shape from which compulsory figures in ice skating are derived
- Figure 8, a riding figure used in the training of horses
- Figure-eight, type of noseband
- Figure eight turn, man overboard rescue turn in sailing
- Figure 8 (belay device), a piece of rock climbing equipment
- Figure of 8, figure in English country dance
- Figure eight (angling), a technique used by anglers to fish specifically for the muskellunge

== Other uses ==
- Figure 8 or bi-directional, response pattern of some microphones
- Figure 8 Puffer (Tetraodon biocellatus), breed of pufferfish
- "Figure Eight", an episode and song from the children's educational series Schoolhouse Rock!
- Figure Eight (restaurant), a restaurant in New York City
- Figure Eight Inc., a crowdsourcing company related to machine learning
- Figure of Eight (novel), a 1936 novel by the British writer Compton Mackenzie
- IEC 60320 C7 power connector

== See also ==
- 8 (disambiguation)
- Figure of eighty (Tethea ocularis), a moth of the family Drepanidae
- List of knots, the names of several of which contain "figure 8" or similar
