= Figuration =

Figuration may refer to:

- In classical music, the use of repetitive patterns; see Figure
- Figurative art, artwork that is derived from real object sources
- Figure (disambiguation)
