= Eighth of the month =

Recurring ordinal calendar date

The eighth of the month or eighth day of the month is the recurring calendar date position corresponding to the day numbered 8 of each month. In the Gregorian calendar (and other calendars that number days sequentially within a month), this day occurs in every month of the year, and therefore occurs twelve times per year.

- Eighth of January
- Eighth of February
- Eighth of March
- Eighth of April
- Eighth of May
- Eighth of June
- Eighth of July
- Eighth of August
- Eighth of September
- Eighth of October
- Eighth of November
- Eighth of December

In addition to these dates, this date occurs in months of many other calendars, such as the Bengali calendar and the Hebrew calendar.

== See also ==
- Eighth (disambiguation)
