= 8V =

8V or 8v may refer to:

- Antoinette 8V, a 1907 French engine
- Fiat 8V, a 1952 sports car
- HF Integrale 8v, a model of Lancia Delta
- 8v, abbreviations for 8 volts
- 8V, abbreviation for 8-valve engine
- Octavarium (album), an album released by Dream Theater
- B-8V, a model of Bensen B-8
- 8v, a model of Ford Duratec engine
- 8V-71, engine used in Detroit Diesel Series 71
- 8V-72, engine used in Detroit Diesel Series 92

== See also ==
- V8 (disambiguation)
