= The 8th =

The 8th or The Eighth may refer to:

- The 8th (Doc Walker album), 2014
- The 8th (Paul Heaton album), 2012
- The 8th (film), 2020 Irish film
- The Eighth (album), by Cecil Taylor, 1981
- The Eighth (United States), a former U.S. holiday

== See also ==
- 8 (disambiguation)
