= 8S (disambiguation) =

8S or 8-S may refer to:

- Crazy Eights, a card game
- Crazy 8s (band), an American band
- Local on the 8s, a regularly scheduled local weather forecast segment
- Scorpio Aviation, IATA code
- TurboJET, IATA code

== See also ==
- 8 Seconds, film about American rodeo legend Lane Frost
- Crazy Eights (disambiguation)
- Eights (disambiguation)
- S8 (disambiguation)
- 8 (disambiguation) for the singular of 8s
