= O8 =

O8 or O-8 may refer to:

- Douglas O-8, an airplane
- Oasis Hong Kong Airlines, a defunct Hong Kong airline
- Octaoxygen (O_{8}) an allotrope of oxygen
- Omaha/8, a poker variant
- Siam Air, a defunct Thai airline
- USS O-8 (SS-69), a O-class submarine of the United States Navy
- O-8, a pay grade of the uniformed services of the United States
- HMS H6, also known in the Royal Netherlands Navy as HNLMS O 8

== See also ==
- 08 (disambiguation)
- 8O (disambiguation)
