= S8 =

S8, S-8, or S 8 may refer to:

== Transportation ==
- S8 (Berlin), an S-Bahn line in Germany
- S8 (Milan suburban railway network) line in Italy
- S8 (Munich) an S-Bahn in Germany
- S8 (RER Vaud), an S-Bahn line in Switzerland
- S8 (Rhine-Main S-Bahn), a line in Germany
- S8 (Rhine-Ruhr S-Bahn), a line in North Rhine-Westphalia, Germany
- S8 (ZVV), a Zurich S-Bahn line in the cantons of Zurich and Zug, Switzerland
- S8, a line in the Brussels Regional Express Network in Belgium
- S8, a line of Styria S-Bahn in Austria
- S8, a line of Tyrol S-Bahn in Austria
- Line S8 (Nanjing Metro) in China
- Stagecoach Gold bus route S8, a bus route in Oxfordshire, England
- Expressway S8 (Poland)
- Short S.8 Calcutta, British transport flying boat
- London Underground S8 Stock

== Other uses ==
- S8 (classification), for disabled swimmers
- S-8 (rocket), a Russian air-to-surface missile
- S8: Keep container dry, a safety phrase in chemistry
- Samsung Galaxy S8, a smartphone by Samsung
- Samsung Galaxy Tab S8, a tablet computer by Samsung
- Octasulfur, the main allotrope of sulfur, having the formula S_{8}
- Audi S8, German car
- S8 (star), in the Sagittarius A* cluster

== See also ==
- 8S (disambiguation)
