= V8 engine (disambiguation) =

A V8 engine is an engine with eight cylinders mounted on the crankcase in two banks of four cylinders.

V8 engine may also refer to:

- V8 (JavaScript engine), the JavaScript compiler used by Google Chrome

== V8 engines in specific lines of automobiles ==
- AMC V8 engine
- BMW OHV V8 engine
- Buick V8 engine
- Cadillac V8 engine
- Chrysler Spitfire V8 engine
- Detroit Diesel V8 engine
- Duramax V8 engine
- Ford SHO V8 engine
- GMC V8 engine
- Holden V8 engine
- Jaguar AJ-V8 engine, compact DOHC V8 piston engine
- Lincoln V8 engine
- Oldsmobile V8 engine
- Pontiac V8 engine
- Rolls-Royce V8 engine
- Rover V8 engine
- Yamaha V8 engine
- Chevrolet Big-Block engine, series of large displacement V8 engines
- Chevrolet small-block engine, series of automobile V8 engines
- Chrysler FirePower engine, Chrysler's first V8 engine
- Ford Flathead engine, first independently designed and built V8 engine produced by the Ford Motor Company for mass production
- Ford Modular engine, V8 and V10 gasoline engine family
- Ford Windsor engine, 90-degree small-block V8
- GM small-block engine, V-8 engine utilized in General Motors' line of rear-wheel-drive cars and trucks
- Toyota UR engine, 32-valve quad-camshaft V8 piston engine series

== See also ==
- V8 (disambiguation)
