= Figure =

Figure may refer to:

== General ==
- A shape, drawing, depiction, or geometric configuration
- Figure (wood), wood appearance
- Figure (music), distinguished from musical motif
- Noise figure, in telecommunication
- Dance figure, an elementary dance pattern
- A person's figure, human physical appearance
- Figure–ground (perception), the distinction between a visually perceived object and its surroundings

== Arts ==
- Figurine, a miniature statuette representation of a creature
- Action figure, a posable jointed solid plastic character figurine
- Figure painting, realistic representation, especially of the human form
- Figure drawing
- Model figure, a scale model of a creature

== Writing ==
- figure, in writing, a type of floating block (text, table, or graphic separate from the main text)
- Figure of speech, also called a rhetorical figure
- Christ figure, a type of character
- in typesetting, text figures and lining figures

== Accounting ==
- Figure, a synonym for number
- Significant figures in a decimal number

== Science and technology ==
- Figure of the Earth, the size and shape of the Earth in geodesy
- Figure AI, an American robotics company

== Sports ==
- Figure (horse), a stallion who became the foundation sire of the Morgan horse breed
- Figure skating
- Compulsory figures
- Figure competition, a form of physique competition for women, related to bodybuilding
- Beyer Speed Figure, a statistic in Thoroughbred racing

== People ==
- Figure (musician), stage name of American electronic musician Josh Gard
- Michael Figures (1947–1996), American politician
- Shomari Figures (born 1985), American politician
- Thomas Figures (1944–2007), American attorney and judge
- Vivian Davis Figures (born 1957), American politician

== See also ==
- Figure 8 (disambiguation)
