= 8O =

8O or 8-O could refer to:

- 8O, IATA code for West Coast Air
- 8º (also 8o), an abbreviation in bookbinding for Octavo
- 8º, an abbreviation for eighth in some languages
  - 8º TAP Rallye de Portugal; see 1974 Rallye de Portugal
- Oxygen (_{8}O), a chemical element

== See also ==
- O8 (disambiguation)
- 80
