= 1/8 =

1/8 or 1/8 may refer to:

- January 8 (in month-day date notation)
- 1 August (in day-month date notation)
- The fraction one eighth, 0.125 in decimals, and 12.5% in percentage
- 1st Battalion, 8th Marines

== See also ==
- Eighth (disambiguation)
- 8 (disambiguation)
- Okta
