= Figure eight (angling) =

The figure eight is a technique used by anglers to fish specifically for the muskellunge. It has been developed due to the nature of the fish's hunting style. Essentially, the figure eight is a final enticement performed by the angler just before lifting the lure out of the water for another cast. To help visualize the concept, think of a roller coaster. As the lure is moved from side to side, it also moves up and down.

The figure eight is named after the pattern in which the angler pulls the lure through the water next to the boat in an attempt to get a following fish to bite. The muskellunge is known for “following” a lure up to the boat rather than immediately striking it. Anglers use different tactics to influence a following muskellunge into biting the bait, such as the figure eight. The figure eight has become a general term used for all boat-side tactics used to catch a following fish. Other boat-side tactics used are "circles", "squares" (L-turns), and "dead sticking".

== Performing a figure eight ==
A successful figure eight begins by watching for a muskellunge behind the lure while retrieving. Retrieve the lure until only 12-18 inches of line are left between the lure and rod tip. Figure eights take focus; one must anticipate the lure getting close to the boat and make the first turn big and fast. After the first turn, the lure should be brought on a long straightaway and make turn number two. Turn number two should go away from the boat rather than towards it to avoid being “handcuffed”, where the lure stops its action and the fish loses interest. Perform the figure eight with the lure, not the rod. This keeps the lure moving in the water. Keep the fish interested. Use every bit of the rod length to create a large figure eight with wide, round turns. Do not do anything abrupt. Make it easy for the fish to take the lure. However, keep a close eye on lure speed. A big drop in speed might decrease the fish’s desire to chase. Other techniques when performing a figure eight include a speed burst, where lure speed is increased dramatically, and dead-sticking, where the lure is completely stopped in the water (not good with bladed baits).

== Proper tackle ==
A long rod is superior for the figure-eight technique; it allows a bigger and deeper figure-8 pattern to be executed. Short rods naturally create a shorter overall figure-eight pattern. They result in tighter-radius patterns, which are often difficult for larger muskies to follow. The longer rod increases the entire size of the figure eight, including widening the turns. Collectively, it becomes far easier for a large fish to follow the lure throughout the entire process. The long rod is also superior after the fish hits. Short rods are stiffer and less forgiving. Additional length helps to keep a very even pressure on the fish at all times, so it cannot break the line or shake the hook loose. This even pressure also prevents tearing in the fish’s mouth which results from excessive pressure during battle. The long rod also enables one to keep a thrashing fish down in the water better, leading to greater success.
