= V8 (disambiguation) =

A V8 is an engine with eight cylinders mounted on the crankcase in two banks of four cylinders.

V8 may also refer to:

== Computers ==
- V8 (JavaScript engine), an open-source JavaScript engine
- ITU-T V.8, a telecommunications recommendation
- V8 Unix, the eighth edition of Research Unix from 1985

== Vehicles ==
- Aston Martin V8, 1969 two-door coupe-type automobile manufactured in the United Kingdom
- Audi V8, a 1988 large luxury saloon/sedan
- Fokker V.8, a German quintuplane
- V8 Supercars, an Australian touring car racing category
- MTX Tatra V8, a supercar
- Rambler V8, a passenger car
- Stelato V8, an electric and extended-range minivan

== Other ==
- V8 (band), a heavy metal band
- V8 (duo), a South Korean duo
  - V8 (EP), a 2026 extended play by the Seventeen sub-unit V8
- V8 (drink), a vegetable juice made by Campbell Soup Company
- V8 Marlborough Street, a grid road in the new town of Milton Keynes, England
- Vigilante 8, a vehicular combat game produced by Luxoflux
- Video8, a generation of 8mm video format
- V8 (TV channel), a defunct Dutch television channel

== See also ==
- ATC code V08 Contrast media, a subgroup of the Anatomical Therapeutic Chemical Classification System
- V8 engine (disambiguation)
- 8V (disambiguation)
