= Eights =

Eights may refer to:

- James Eights (1798–1882), American physician, scientist, and artist
- Eights Coast, portion of the coast of West Antarctica
- Eights Station, American research station in Antarctica, operated from 1963 to 1965
- Crazy Eights, a card game
- Eight (rowing), a rowing shell for eight people plus coxswain
- Eights Week, a four-day regatta of bumps races at the University of Oxford

== See also ==
- 8S (disambiguation)
- Eight (disambiguation)
