= Descent (aeronautics) =

Any period of time during an aircraft's flight when its altitude decreases

In aeronautics, a descent is any time period during air travel where an aircraft decreases altitude, and is the opposite of an ascent or climb.

Descents are part of normal procedures, but also occur during emergencies, such as rapid or explosive decompression, forcing an emergency descent to below 3,000 m (10,000 ft) and preferably below 2,400 m (8,000 ft), respectively the maximum temporary safe altitude for an unpressurized aircraft and the maximum safe altitude for extended duration. (Note: See Loss of pressurization: The maximum sustained cabin pressure altitude is 2,400 m (8,000 ft). To counter potential passenger and crew decompression sickness, hypoxia, edemas, and rewarm the cabin, pilots descend to minimum safe altitude which avoids terrain.)

An example of explosive decompression is Aloha Airlines Flight 243. Involuntary descent might occur from a decrease in power, decreased lift (wing icing), an increase in drag, or flying in an air mass moving downward, such as a terrain induced downdraft, near a thunderstorm, in a downburst, or microburst.

== Normal descents ==
Intentional descents might be undertaken to land, avoid other air traffic or poor flight conditions (turbulence, icing conditions, or bad weather), clouds (particularly under visual flight rules), to see something lower, to enter warmer air (see adiabatic lapse rate), or to take advantage of wind direction of a different altitude, particularly with balloons.

Normal descents take place at a constant airspeed and constant angle of descent (3 degree final approach at most airports). The pilot controls the angle of descent by varying engine power and pitch angle (lowering the nose) to keep the airspeed constant. Unpowered descents (such as engine failure) are steeper than powered descents but flown in a similar way as a glider.

== Rapid descents ==
Rapid descents relate to dramatic changes in cabin air pressure—even pressurized aircraft—and can result in discomfort in the middle ear. Relief is achieved by decreasing relative pressure by equalizing the middle ear with ambient pressure ("popping ears") through swallowing, yawning, chewing, or the valsalva maneuver.

Helicopters which lose power do not simply fall out of the sky. In a maneuver called autorotation, the pilot configures the rotors to spin faster driven by the upward moving air, which limits the rate of descent. Very shortly before meeting the ground, the pilot changes the momentum stored in the rotor to increase lift to slow the rate of descent to a normal landing (but without extended hovering).

=== Tactical descent ===
A tactical descent is a maneuver typically used only by military aircraft. It consists of a steep angle dive to lose altitude rapidly, with the use of thrust reversers to prevent excessive speed.

=== Dives ===
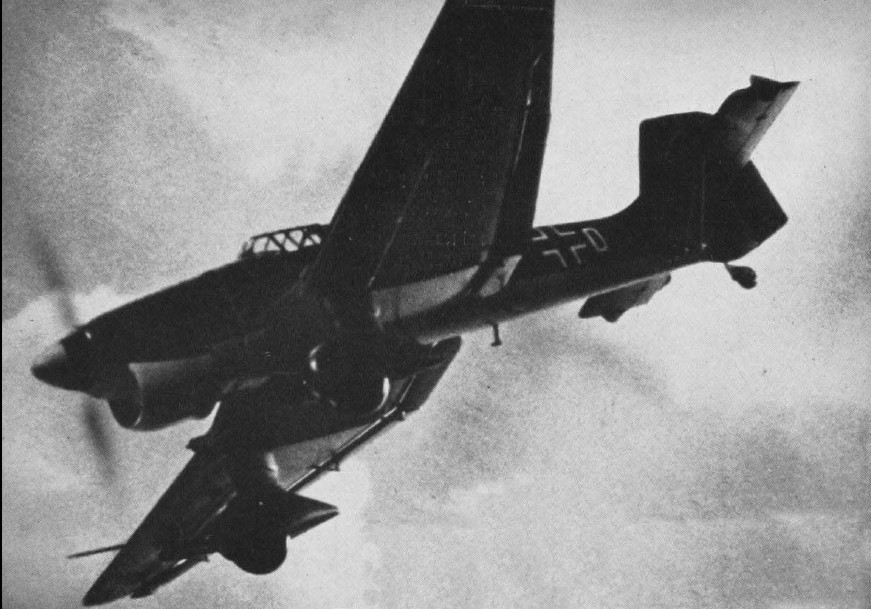
Ju 87B "Stuka" dive bomber

A dive or nosedive is "a steep descending flight path". While there is no specific definition for what degree of steepness transforms a downward trajectory into a dive, it is necessarily a rapid, nose-forward descent. Dives are used intentionally in aerobatic flying to build speed for the performance of stunts, and by dive bombers to approach a target quickly while minimizing exposure to enemy fire before the dive, and in order to increase accuracy of the bombing. A dive may also be used as an emergency maneuver, for example to extinguish an engine fire.

Pilots of the World War II dive bomber known as the Stuka particularly noted the effects of the dive. Beginning at a height of 4,600 m (15,000 ft), the Stuka would roll 180°, automatically nosing into a dive. The aircraft would then dive at a 60-90° angle, holding a constant speed of 500 to 600 km/h (270 to 320 kn; 310 to 370 mph), until it had gone some 90% of the way to the ground, releasing its bombs at a minimum height of 450 m (1,480 ft). Once the pilot released the bomb and initiated an automatic pull-out mechanism by depressing a knob on the control column, the aircraft automatically began a six g pullout. The tremendous g-forces to which pilots were subjected during this maneuver could lead to momentary blackouts, necessitating the inclusion of mechanisms to automate pullout from the dive while the pilot was unconscious.

== See also ==
- Corkscrew landing – Rapid spiraling descent typically used for avoiding ground-to-air weapons during conflicts
- Teardrop penetration – Combines a teardrop turn with a descent, usually under instrument flight rules
- Takeoff
- Cruise
