= Teardrop turn =

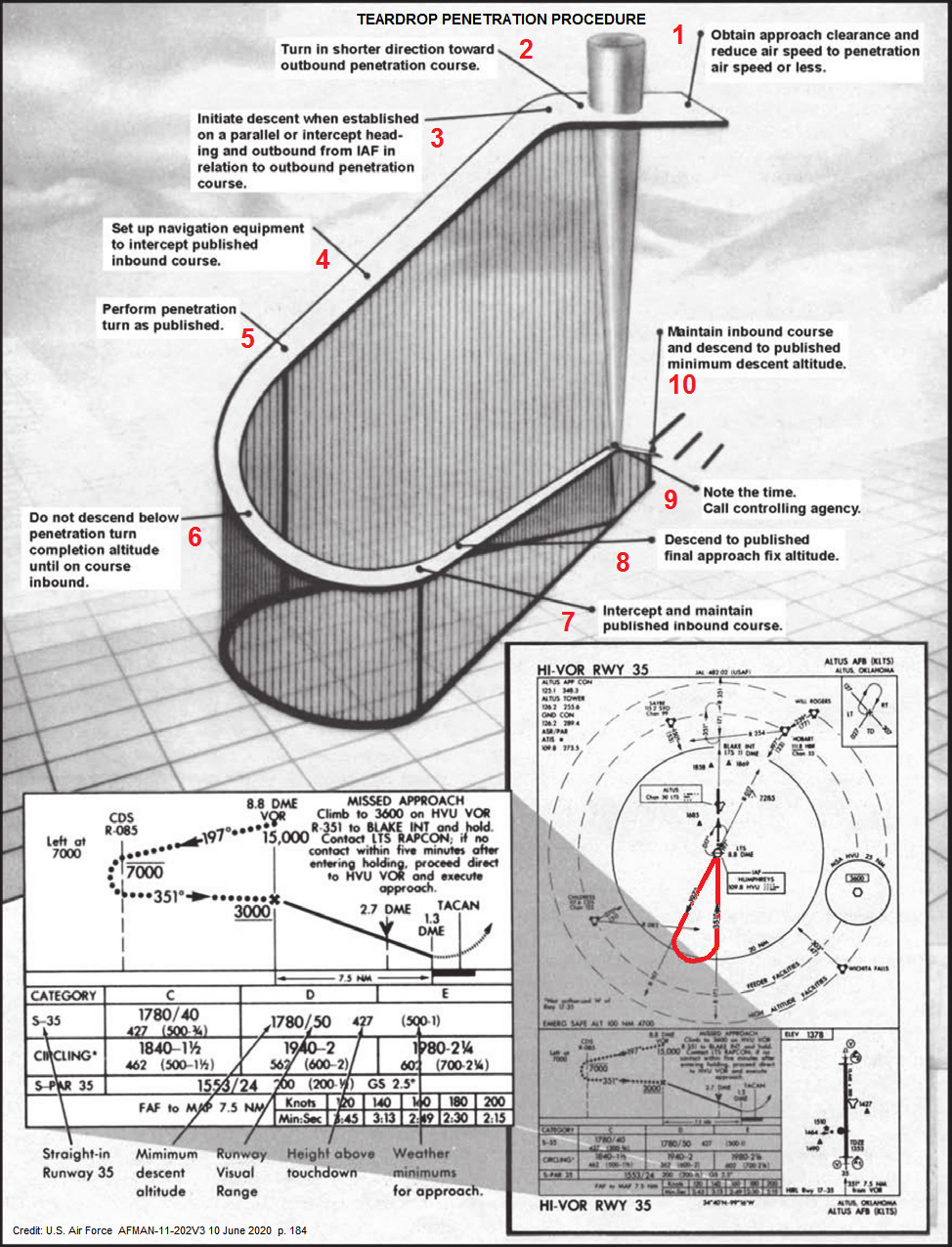
Teardrop penetration procedure diagram

A teardrop turn is a method of reversing the course of an aircraft or vessel so that it returns on its original path, travelling in the opposite direction, and passes through a specified point on the original path.

== Concept ==
Aircraft
The teardrop turn has been described as a difficult maneuver which provides little margin for error, especially as an aviation procedure where a misjudgment can result in a stall and crash. The name comes from the overhead view of the track, which resembles an idealized teardrop. Teardrop turns are commonly used during air shows to make several passes over the runway, flying in opposite directions. Aircraft can use the teardrop turn to return to a fix while descending, a procedure called a teardrop penetration. Teardrop penetrations are typically performed under instrument flight rules.

Watercraft
Ships and power boats generally use one of two types of teardrop turn to recover a man overboard: the Williamson turn or the Scharnow turn, which differ primarily in the direction of the path around the teardrop and the distance from the point of interest when the manoeuvre is begun.

== See also ==
- Man overboard rescue turn
