= Sri Lanka Railways M8 =

Class M8
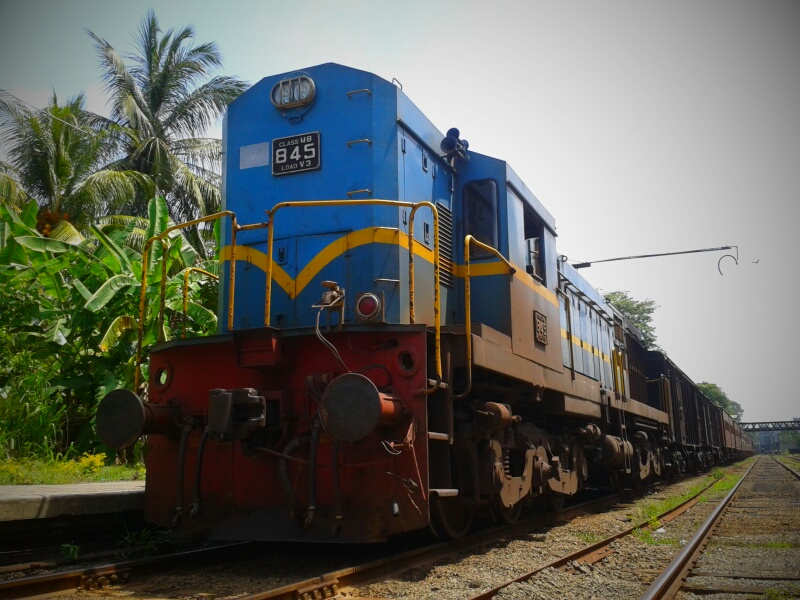
- Class M8 No. 846
Type and origin
- Power type: Diesel
- Builder: Banaras Locomotive Works
- Model: M8 (WDM-2), M8A(?)
- Build date: 1995-2001
- Total produced: M8(8), M8A (2)
Specifications
- Configuration
  - UIC: Co'Co'
- Gauge: 1,676 mm (5 ft 6 in)
- Wheel diameter: 1,092 mm (3 ft 7 in)
- Wheelbase: 12.834 m (42 ft 1 1/4 in)
- Length: 17.12 m (56 ft 2 in)
- Width: 2.864 m (9 ft 4 3/4 in)
- Height: 4.185 m (13 ft 8 3/4 in)
- Axle load: 18,800 kg (41,400 lb)
- Loco weight: 112,800 kg (248,700 lb)
- Fuel capacity: 5,000 L (1,100 imp gal; 1,300 US gal)
- Prime mover: ALCO 251-B
- RPM range: 400 - 1000 rpm
- Engine type: M8 V16 diesel M8A V12 diesel
- Aspiration: Turbo-supercharged
- Cylinders: M8 (16), M8A (12)
- Cylinder size: M8 228 mm × 266 mm (8.98 in × 10.47 in); M8A?
- Train brakes: Air, Vacuum
Performance figures
- Maximum speed: 120 km/h (75 mph)
- Power output: M8(2,800 hp (2,100 kW)); M8A(2,200 hp (1,600 kW))
- Factor of adh.: 0.27
Career
- Operators: Sri Lanka Railways
- Numbers: M8 (841-848), M8A(877,878)
- Locale: Sri Lanka
- Delivered: M8 (1996), M8A (2001)
- Current owner: Sri Lanka Railways
- Disposition: active

Sri Lanka Railways Class M8 is a class of Sri Lankan diesel-electric locomotive that was developed by Banaras Locomotive Works at Varanasi, India, in 1996. This class of locomotives was fitted with 2,800 hp (2,100 kW) V16 power units. This is used on both passenger and freight trains on Sri Lanka Railways.

== Performance ==
This locomotive is capable of hauling 20 carriages at once but usually not used to haul more than 18 carriages. Major problems that are seen in this class are maintenance difficulties and corrosion.

== Sub classes ==
=== M8A ===
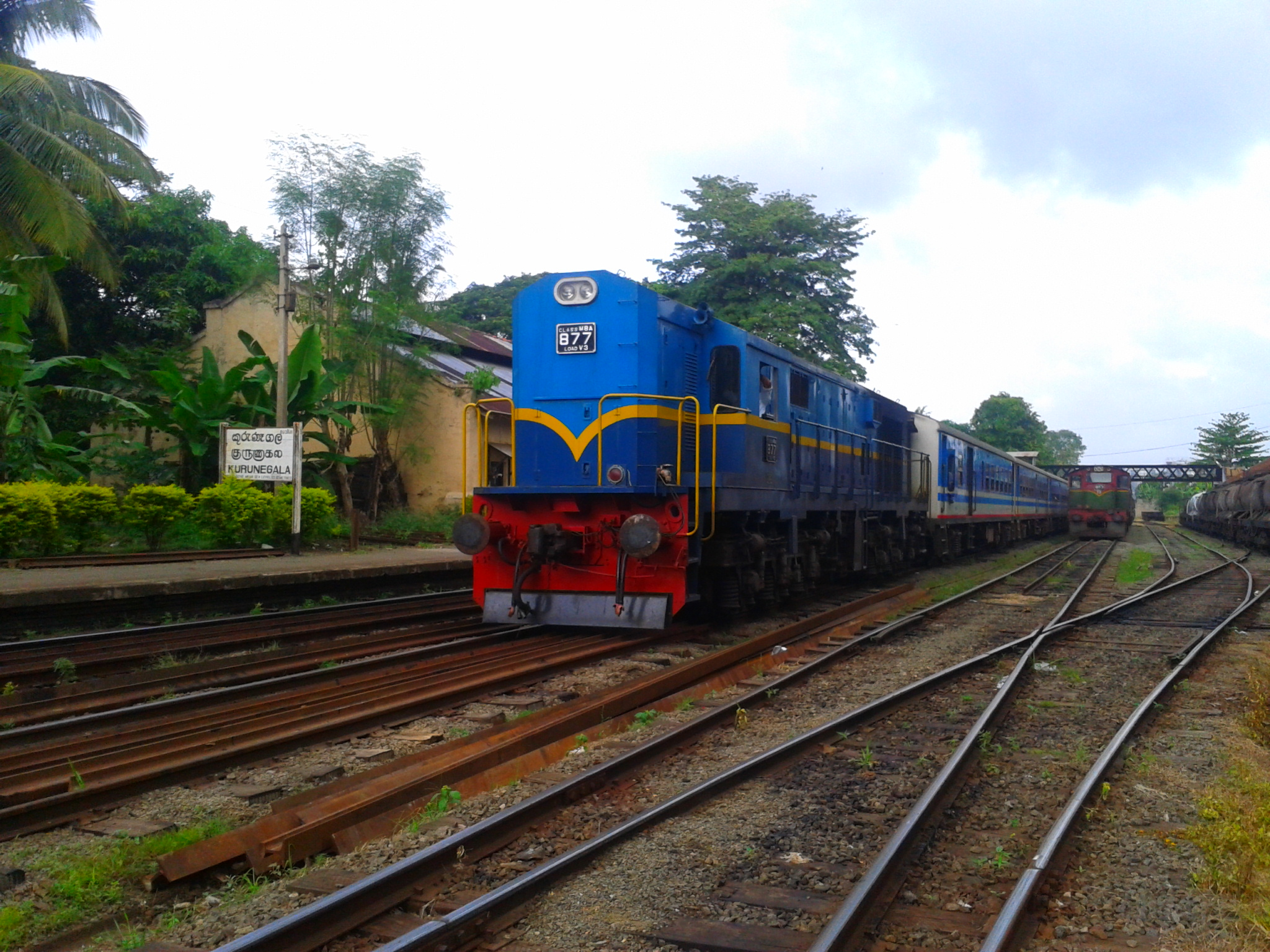
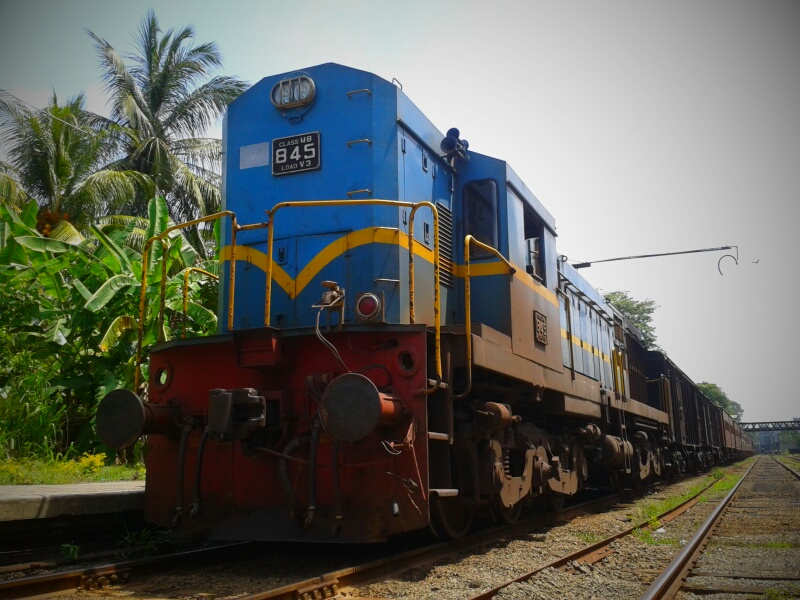
Left:Class M8A, Right:Class M8

Two (877 & 878) short truck M8A locomotives were delivered in 2001. They were imported to use on Upcountry main line, but it was impossible to run them due to their wheel design of HAHS bogie without equaliser beams. M8A locomotives were built using 2,200 hp (1,600 kW) V12 power units.

== Current operation ==
M8 and M8A are not used on the Main Line above Nawalapitiya and on the Kelani Valley Line but are operated on other lines. This locomotive is used when it need to pull much heavy load. Mainly used in flat lines like Northern Line, Trincomalee Line, Batticaloa Line and Coastal Line.

Depot for the M8s is Diesel Electric Locomotive Shed at Maradana.

== Accidents and incidents ==
- M8A No. 878 was seriously damaged in an accident with a concrete mixing transport truck. Since the accident, the locomotive has been repaired and put back into service.

== See also ==
- Sri Lanka Railways

== Notes and references ==
- Hyatt, David. Railways of Sri Lanka.
