= 8 (2023 film) =

2023 Indian film

- Poster
- Directed by: Roshin A Rahman
- Produced by: Muhsina Koyakutty
- Starring: Favaz Jalaludeen; Aneesha Ummer; Irfan Imam
- Cinematography: Bharat R Sekhar
- Edited by: Vishnu Venugopal
- Music by: Santhi Krishnan
- Release date: September 29, 2023
- Running time: 75 minutes
- Country: India
- Language: Malayalam

8 is a 2023 Indian Malayalam-language crime-thriller film directed by Roshin A Rahman and produced by Muhsina Koyakutty. The film stars Favaz Jalaludeen, Irfan Imam, Aneesha Ummer, Vinod Guinness, Ambi Neenasam, Althwaf S, Aiswarya, Sarika etc. The lead actor was also known for being the first actor to buy land on the Moon, purchasing 8 acres of land on behalf of the movie.

== Cast ==
- Favaz Jalaludeen
- Irfan Imam
- Aneesha Ummer
- Vinod Guinness
- Ambi Neenasam
- Aiswarya
- Sarika

== Plot ==
As the police solve the mystery of two friends' deaths, a voicemail from a girl comes in, complicating the case even more.

== Release ==
The film was released in theatres on 29 September 2023.
