= Eighth Amendment =

Eighth Amendment may refer to:

- Eighth Amendment to the United States Constitution, part of the United States Bill of Rights
- Eighth Amendment of the Constitution of India, extended the period of reserved seats in the parliament
- Eighth Amendment of the Constitution of Ireland, which recognized the equal right to life of an unborn child
- Eighth Amendment to the Constitution of Pakistan, which changed Pakistan's government from a parliamentary system to a semi-presidential system
- Eighth Amendment of the Constitution of South Africa, which allowed members of municipal councils to cross the floor from one political party to another without losing their seats
