= Man overboard rescue turn =

Sailing maneuver on learning of a man overboard

A man overboard rescue turn (or person overboard) is a shiphandling manoeuvre usually implemented immediately upon learning of a person having gone overboard into the sea. To bring a vessel closer to the person's location, implementations of the principles described are: the Anderson turn (or single turn), the quick turn (also known as the Q-turn or the figure eight turn), the Williamson turn, and the Scharnow turn.

The choice of manoeuvre is dependent on several factors, including:

- Location of the casualty
- Whether the casualty is seen going overboard immediately or if their missing is delayed
- Whether the ship is using engines or using sails
- The space available for the vessel to steer
- The training of the crew involved.

Ideally, in any man overboard scenario, the casualty should be approached with the vessel downwind of the persons position, with the vessel moving upwind.

The man overboard rescue turn is often carried out as part of regular drills on merchant ships as a requirement of the SOLAS Convention.

== Anderson (single) turn ==
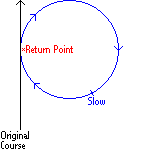

The Anderson turn (also known as a single turn) is a manoeuvre commonly used to bring a ship or boat with engines back to a point it previously passed through, often for the purpose of recovering a casualty in the quickest time possible.

The Anderson turn is most appropriate when the point to be reached remains clearly visible. For other situations, a Scharnow turn or a Williamson turn might be more appropriate. Both require more time to return to the target point.

An Anderson turn consists of 1.) putting the rudder hard over to the side of the casualty, 2.) deviating 250 degrees from the original course, 3.) placing the rudder amidships and maintaining speed throughout the turn, 4.) stopping the vessel when the casualty is approximately 15 degrees off the bow.

Ideally, if dealing with a man overboard, the vessel should always be manoeuvred upwind of the person. The vessel engines should be stopped with the person well forward of the propellers to prevent injury.

== Quick turn ==
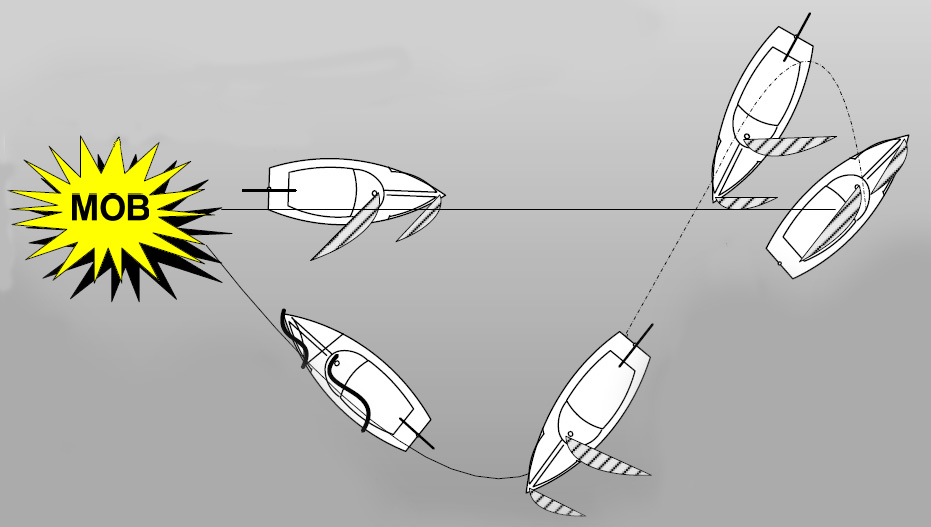
Quick turn

For Sailing ships, the quick turn is the traditional response to a man overboard emergency on a sailboat. Despite other approaches, it is still a robust strategy and can be the best method, depending on the situation. Certainly when the crew is shorthanded, or when the vessel is in heavy weather, the quick turn method has a lot of merit because it avoids a jibe. The quick turn is essentially a figure eight. On a sailboat it consists of the following steps:

1. Change course to a beam reach and hold for 15 seconds
2. Head into the wind and tack, leave the jib fluttering
3. Veer off until the boat is at a broad reach
4. Turn upwind until the vessel is pointing at the victim; at this point the vessel should be on a close reach.
5. Slacken the mainsail until the vessel comes to a stop with the victim in the lee side of the boat.

== Williamson turn ==
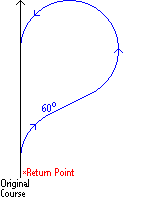

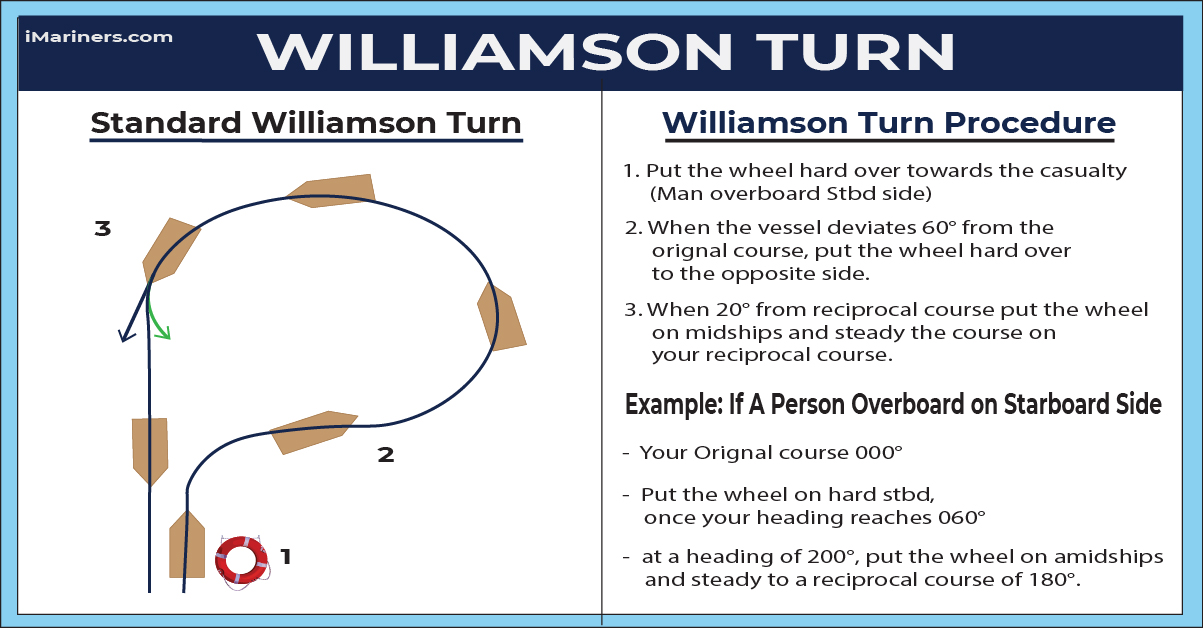

The Williamson turn is an alternative manoeuvre used to bring a ship or boat under power back to a point it previously passed through, often for the purpose of recovering a casualty at sea. It was named for John Williamson, USNR, who used it in 1943 to recover a man who had fallen overboard. However, according to Uncommon Carriers by John McPhee, the maneuver was originally called the "Butakov pipe" and was used in the Russo-Japanese War as a way of keeping guns at the same distance from an enemy. It was also used by U.S. Navy nuclear submarines to clear their sonar dead zones.

The Williamson turn is the most preferred maneuver by navigating officers onboard ship as it can be used in any condition of visibility and weather. The suitability of the turn depends on the situation:

- Immediate Action Situation: Not as quick as the single turn in an immediate action situation and take the ship further away from the casualty, but it is effective.
- Delayed Action Situation: Mostly it will take the ship to the casualty
- Person Missing Situation: Recommended as it will bring the vessel to its reciprocal course.

A Williamson turn generally consists of:

1. Placing the rudder full over to the side of the casualty
2. Deviating 60 degrees from the original course and then shifting the rudder full over to the opposite side
3. When the heading is approximately 20 degrees short of the reciprocal course, the rudder should be placed amidships and the vessel steadied up
4. The engines should be stopped in the water with the person alongside, well forward of the propellers.

As Williamson turns can be used in any situation, they may be incorporated in a marine Safety Management System (SMS). The SMS may include a drill matrix, requiring that the ship's company conduct man overboard drills and Williamson turn drills at regular intervals such as every three months.

== Scharnow turn ==
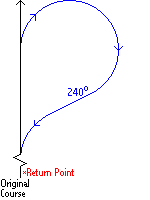

The Scharnow turn is a manoeuvre used to bring a ship or boat back to a point it previously passed through and was developed by and named for Ulrich Scharnow. The primary advantage of the Scharnow turn is that after the turn has been completed, the vessel will be proceeding on a reciprocal course in its own wake.

The Scharnow turn is most appropriate when the point to be reached is significantly further astern than the vessel's turning radius. For other situations, an Anderson turn or a Williamson turn might be more appropriate.

Generally, a Scharnow turn involves 1.) placing the rudder hard over in any direction, 2.) deviating 240 degrees from the original course and then placing the rudder hard over to the opposite, 3.) when the heading is 20 degrees from the reciprocal course, the rudder should be placed amidships and engines stopped to bring the vessel alongside the casualty.

== See also ==
- Seamanship
- Teardrop turn
