= Wolseley Eight =

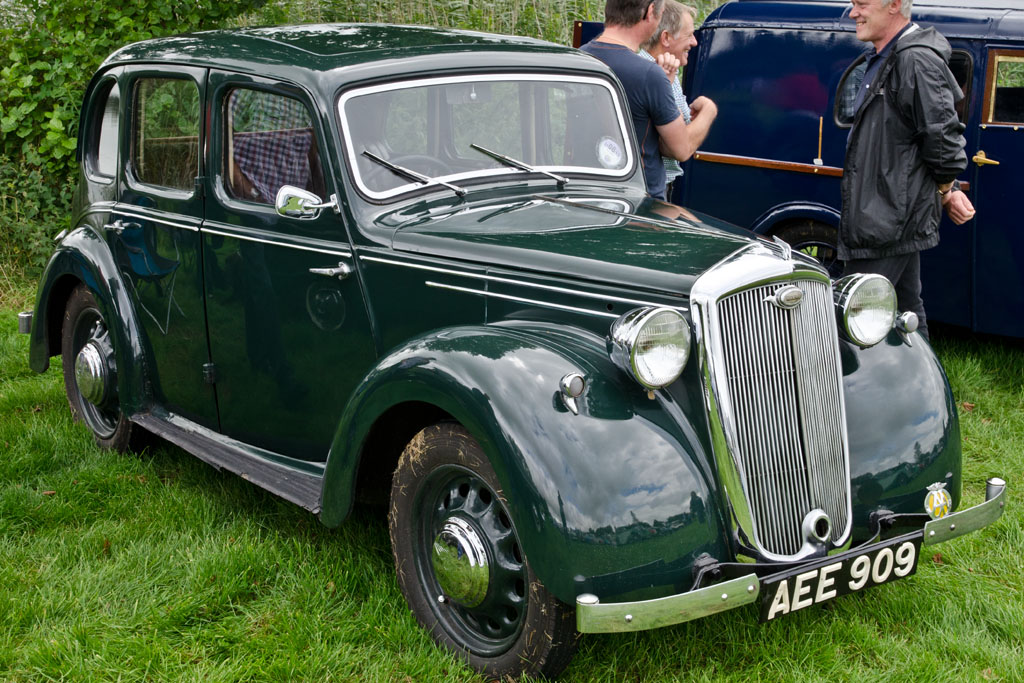
- Wolseley Eight (1947)

Overview
- Manufacturer: Wolseley Motors
- Production: 1946–1948; 5344 made
- Assembly: United Kingdom: Birmingham, England (Ward End Works)

Body and chassis
- Body style: 4-door saloon

Powertrain
- Engine: 918 cc overhead valve, straight-4
- Transmission: 4-speed manual

Dimensions
- Wheelbase: 89 in (2,300 mm)
- Length: 145 in (3,700 mm)
- Width: 56 in (1,400 mm)

The Wolseley Eight is a four-door, light saloon car which was produced by Wolseley Motors from 1946 until 1948. It was based on the Morris Eight Series E and also shared many body panels with the MG Y-type. At the time it was said to be Lord Nuffield's favourite car. The car was designed before World War II and was originally intended to have been launched in 1940. In line with the prevailing economic directives from the United Kingdom government, the majority of cars were exported.

Although based on the 1938 Morris Eight, the car was given a very different external appearance by having a traditional Wolseley bonnet and grille and the boot lid was bottom rather than top hinged. The engine was converted from the side valve original to an overhead valve type and the power output consequently increased from the original 29 bhp (22 kW) to 33 bhp (25 kW). The suspension was non-independent and used half elliptic leaf springs front and rear and the brakes were drums all round, hydraulically actuated. The electrical system was 6 volt.

The car had an up-market interior with leather upholstery, pile carpets and walnut trim. Another traditional feature was an opening windscreen. All models had four doors, the two-door version of the Morris body was not offered as a Wolseley. At launch the car was priced at £416, £115 more than the Morris.
