= The Eighth Day =

The Eighth Day may refer to:

== Observances ==
- Octave (liturgy)
- Shemini Atzeret, the eighth day of the Jewish Feast of Tabernacles
- The eighth day (Christian)

== Film ==
- Gattaca, a 1997 film with working title The Eighth Day
- On the 8th Day (1984 film), a documentary about nuclear winter
- The Eighth Day (1996 film), a Belgian film, directed by Jaco Van Dormael

== Literature ==
- The Eighth Day (Wilder novel), a 1967 novel by Thornton Wilder
- The Eighth Day (Westphal book), by Euler Renato Westphal
- The Eighth Day (Kakuta novel), 2007, by Mitsuyo Kakuta

== Music ==
- 8th Day (Jewish band), an American Hasidic pop rock band
- 8th Day (R&B group), an American R&B group active in the 1970s
- "8th Day" (song), by Canadian country music artist Dean Brody
- "The Eighth Day" (The Damned song), a song by The Damned on their 1985 album Phantasmagoria
- "Eighth Day (Hazel O'Connor song)", a song by Hazel O'Connor from the album Breaking Glass
- The 8th Day (album), by American underground nerdcore rapper Raheem Jarbo
- "The Eighth Day", a song recorded by Screamin' Jay Hawkins

== See also ==
- Eighth Day Books, a bookstore in Wichita, Kansas
- Octava Dies
