= The 8th (film) =

2020 Irish documentary film

- Directed by: Aideen Kane; Lucy Kennedy; Maeve O'Boyle
- Starring: Wendy Grace; Andrea Horan; Ailbhe Smyth; Maria Steen
- Release date: 2020
- Running time: 94 minutes
- Country: Ireland
- Language: English

The 8th is a 2020 documentary film about the campaign to repeal the Thirty-sixth Amendment of the Constitution of Ireland, which gave equal rights to the lives of a pregnant woman and her unborn child. Consequently, the repeal of this amendment repealed the ban on abortion.

== Reception ==
On Rotten Tomatoes, the film holds an approval rating of 100% based on 14 reviews, with an average rating of 8.40/10.
