= Line 8 =

Line 8 or 8 Line may refer to:

== Asia ==
=== China ===
- Line 8 (Beijing Subway)
- Line 8 (Changchun Rail Transit)
- Line 8 (Chengdu Metro)
- Line 8 (Guangzhou Metro)
- Line 8 (Hangzhou Metro)
- Line 8 (Hefei Metro)
- Line 8 (Jinan Metro)
- Line 8 (Ningbo Rail Transit)
- Line 8 (Qingdao Metro)
- Line 8 (Shanghai Metro)
- Line 8 (Shenzhen Metro)
- Line 8 (Suzhou Metro)
- Line 8 (Tianjin Metro) (currently known as Phase 2 of Line 6)
- Line 8 (Wuhan Metro)
- Line 8 (Xi'an Metro)

=== India ===
- Line 8 (Delhi Metro), or Magenta Line
- Line 8 (Mumbai Metro)

=== Japan ===
- Line 8 (Osaka), or Imazatosuji Line

=== Malaysia ===
- KL Monorail, numbered 8

=== Philippines ===
- MRT Line 8, Metro Manila

=== South Korea ===
- Seoul Subway Line 8

=== Thailand ===
- Bus Line 8 (Bangkok)

== Australia ==
- T8 Airport & South Line, Sydney Trains service

== Europe ==
=== France ===
- Paris Metro Line 8

=== Russia ===
- Line 8 (Moscow Metro) and 8A, or Kalininsko–Solntsevskaya line

=== Spain ===
- Barcelona Metro line 8
- Line 8 (Madrid Metro)

=== Switzerland ===
- S8 (ZVV), Zurich

== North America ==
=== Cuba ===
- Line 8 (Havana Suburban Railway)

=== Mexico ===
- Mexico City Metro Line 8

=== Panama ===
- Line 8 (Panama Metro) (planned)

=== United States ===
- 8 (Los Angeles Railway) (defunct)
- 8 (New York City Subway service) (defunct)
- Route 8 (Baltimore), a bus route, now subsumed by CityLink Red

== South America ==
=== Brazil ===
- Line 8 (CPTM), São Paulo

=== Chile ===
- Santiago Metro Line 8, a line that is in planning

== See also ==
- List of public transport routes numbered 8
