= 08 =

08 may refer to:

- The year 2008, or any year ending with 08
- The month of August
- 8 (number)
- 08, the telephone area code for Stockholm
- 08, the number of the French department Ardennes
- The telephone area code for South Australia, Western Australia and Northern Territory
- Lynk & Co 08, a mid-size crossover SUV
- British Rail Class 08, a class of locomotive built by British Railways

== See also ==
- O8 (disambiguation)
