= Eight, West Virginia =

Unincorporated community in West Virginia, United States

Eight
- Unincorporated community
- Location within the state of West Virginia Eight (the United States)
- Coordinates: 37°15′47″N 81°36′12″W
- Country: United States
- State: West Virginia
- County: McDowell
- Elevation: 1,683 ft (513 m)
- Time zone: UTC-5 (Eastern (EST))
  - Summer (DST): UTC-4 (EDT)
- FIPS code: 2747239

Eight is an unincorporated community located in McDowell County, West Virginia, United States. The Eight post office closed in 1936.

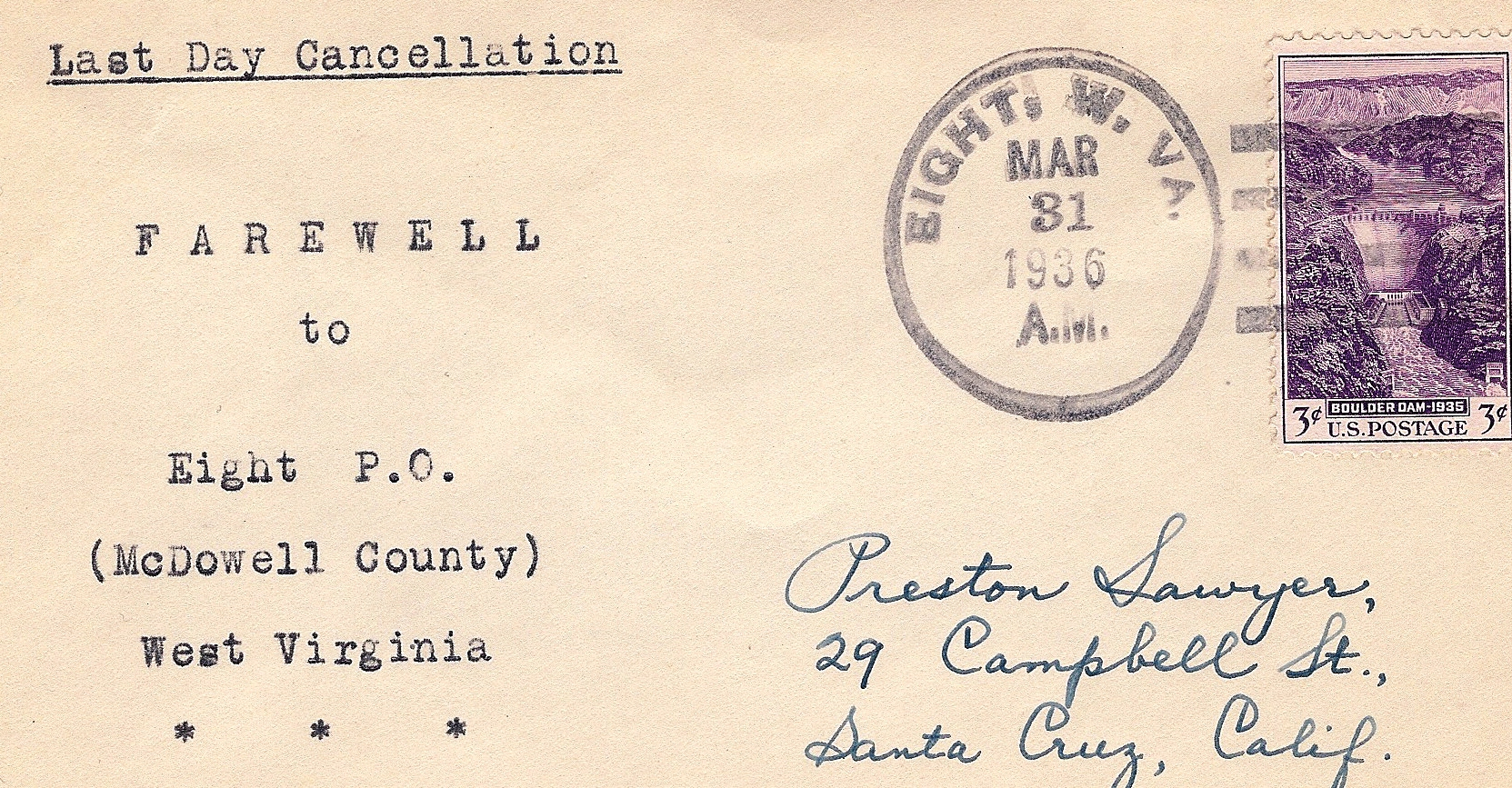
Letter postmarked in Eight at the time of post office's closure.

== See also ==
- List of places with numeric names
