= Number 8, Pershore =

Community arts centre in Pershore, England

Coordinates: 52.1102°N 2.0750°W

Number 8 is a community arts centre in the English town of Pershore. It includes a 250-seat auditorium used for music, theatre and cinema events, a small dance and rehearsal space, conference facilities, a gallery, café and bar. It opened in 2004 in a renovated 18th-century building at 8 High Street. Number 8 is also the home of the local arts group PODS (The Pershore Operatic and Dramatic Society), and more recently PODYS (Pershore Operatic and Dramatic Youth Society), who regularly perform there.
