= Octet (Lachner) =

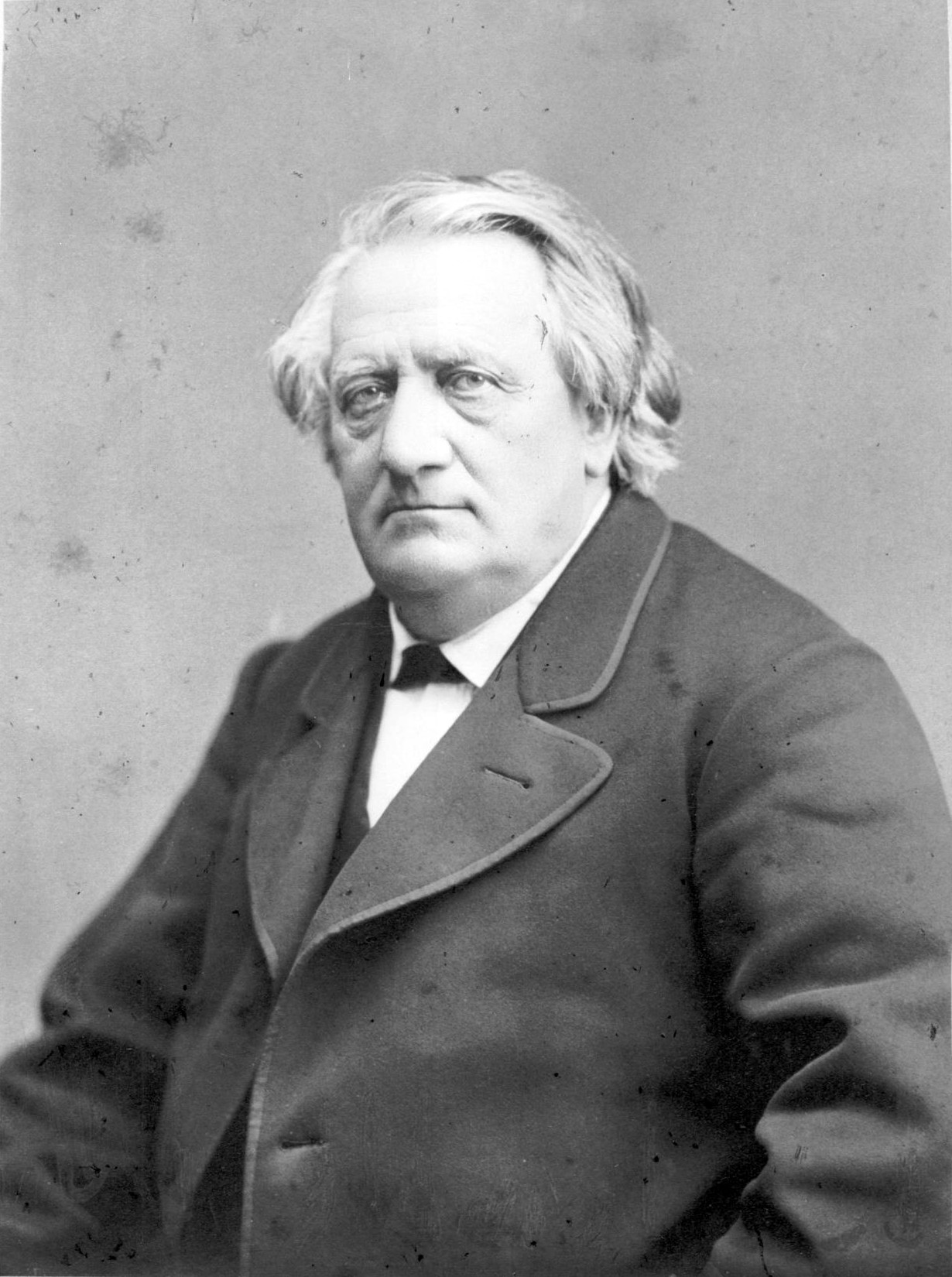
Franz Lachner

Franz Lachner's Octet in B♭ major, Op. 156 is a composition for eight wind instruments composed around 1850. While scored for a chamber ensemble, the work is considered to be symphonic in scope.

== Instrumentation ==
The composition is scored for flute, oboe, 2 clarinets, 2 horns and 2 bassoons. This scoring is shared with the octets composed by Theodore Gouvy (Op. 71) and Carl Reinecke (Op. 216). It is unclear why Lachner elected to replace one of the oboes in the standard Harmonie with a flute, but Rentería notes that, at the time the Octet was composed flutes were beginning to be made out of metal, producing a stronger sound that better blended with the other instruments.

== Structure ==
The composition is in four movements:

1. Allegro moderato
2. Adagio
3. Scherzo: Allegro assai
4. Finale: Allegro non troppo

A typical performance takes around 25 minutes.
