= The Soul Collector (2019 film) =

2019 South African film

The Soul Collector; 8: A South African Horror Story; 8
- Film poster
- Directed by: Harold Holscher
- Written by: Harold Holscher; Johannes Ferdinand Van Zyl
- Starring: Garth Breyetenbach; Inge Beckmann; Keita Luna; Tshamano Sebe
- Cinematography: David Pienaar
- Edited by: Jacques Le Roux
- Music by: Elben Schutte
- Production company: Man Makes A Picture Production
- Distributed by: Netflix
- Release dates: 20 July 2019 (Fantasia Film Festival); 19 June 2020 (Africa)
- Running time: 98 min.
- Country: South Africa
- Language: English
- Box office: $142,725

The Soul Collector (also known as 8: A South African Horror Story or simply 8) is a 2019 South African supernatural thriller film written by Johannes Ferdinand Van Zyl and Harold Holscher, who is also the director. The film stars Garth Breyetenbach, Inge Beckmann, Keita Luna and Tshamano Sebe.

== Plot ==
Finding himself bankrupt, William Ziel is forced to return to the farm he inherited from his father to start a new life with his fragmented family. He finds the farm has no electricity or water and tries to turn on the lights and fails and opts to spend the night with candles on. They sleep by the fire place. The next day he tries to fix the generator but fails, meanwhile his daughter Mary wanders off in the forest and meets a strange man who introduces himself as Lazarus. Mary tells Lazarus that she has lost her way and needs help finding her way back home. So Lazarus helps Mary and take her back to her family. Upon reaching there William and his wife have contrasting reactions towards Lazarus. Lazarus tells them that he used to work for William's grandfather, and he could be of assistance to William as he is struggling to set up the place but his wife dismiss Lazarus. Later that evening while they are having supper, the lights turn on and when William goes out to check what happened he finds Lazarus who had then fixed the Generator. William then ask Lazarus if he could help him around the farm and offers him the shed as a room then Lazarus ends up stealing their souls.

== Cast ==
- Garth Breyetenbach as William Ziel
- Inge Beckmann as Sarah
- Keita Luna as Mary
- Tshamano Sebe as Lazarus

== Release ==
The film had its world premiere at the 2019 Fantasia Film Festival on 20 July 2019.

Since 19 June 2020, the film is available on Netflix. It is also available on Shudder.
