= List of public transport routes numbered 8 =

In public transport, Route 8 may refer to:

- Route 8 (MTA Maryland), a bus route in Baltimore, Maryland and its suburbs
- Barcelona Metro line 8
- Line 8 (Madrid Metro)
- NWFB Route 8, a bus route in Hong Kong
- London Buses route 8
- Seoul Subway Line 8
- Melbourne tram route 8, ceased in April 2017
- Mexico City Metro Line 8

== See also ==
- Line 8 (disambiguation)
