= Octet (Reinecke) =

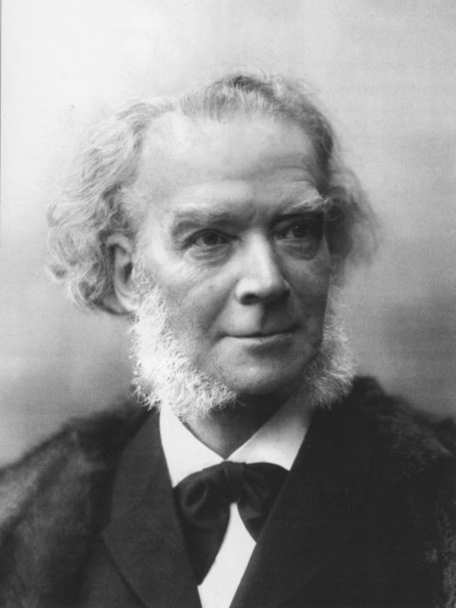
Carl Reinecke in c. 1890

Carl Reinecke's Octet in B♭ major, Op. 216 is a composition for eight wind instruments composed around 1892.

The exact reason for the composition of the Octet is not known, though Hoover speculates that it may have been intended for the Société de Musique de Chambre pour Instruments à Vent founded by flutist Paul Taffanel.

== Music ==
The composition shares with the Lachner (Op. 156) and Gouvy (Op. 71) octets scoring for flute, oboe, 2 clarinets, 2 horns, and 2 bassoons.

The composition is in four movements:

1. Allegro moderato
2. Scherzo: Vivace
3. Adagio ma non troppo
4. Finale: Allegro molto e grazioso

A typical performance takes around 22 – 23 minutes.
