= 8th Division =

8th Division, 8th Infantry Division or 8th Armored Division may refer to:

== Infantry divisions ==
- 8th Division (Australia)
- 8th Infantry Division (Belgium)
- 8th Canadian Infantry Division
- 8th Division (1st Formation) (People's Republic of China), 1949–1952
- 8th Motorized Infantry Division, People's Republic of China
- 8th Infantry Division (France)
- 8th Division (German Empire)
- 8th Ersatz Division, German Empire
- 8th Landwehr Division, German Empire
- 8th Bavarian Reserve Division, a unit of the Imperial German Army in World War I
- 8th Infantry Division (Greece)
- 8th (Lucknow) Division, a unit of the British Indian Army before and during World War I
- 8th Infantry Division (India)
- 8th Marching Division, Italy
- 8th Najaf Ashraf Division, Iran
- 8th Division (Iraq)
- 8th Division (Imperial Japanese Army)
- 8th Division (Japan)
- 8th Division (Nigeria)
- 8th Division (North Korea)
- 8th Infantry Division (Pakistan), part of XXX Corps
- 8th Infantry Division (Philippines)
- 8th Infantry Division (Poland)
- 8th Infantry Division (Russian Empire)
- 8th Siberian Rifle Division, Russian Empire
- 8th Maneuver Division, South Korea
- 8th Rifle Division (Soviet Union), Soviet Union
- 8th Guards Airborne Division, Soviet Union
- 8th Guards Rifle Division, later 8th Guards Motor Rifle Division, Soviet Union
- 8th Motor Rifle Division NKVD
- 8th Infantry Division (United Kingdom)
- 8th Infantry Division (United States)
- 8th Jäger Division, Wehrmacht
- 8th Luftwaffe Field Division, Wehrmacht
- 8th Mountain Division, Wehrmacht
- 8th Parachute Division, Wehrmacht
- 8th Division (Yugoslav Partisans)

== Cavalry divisions ==
- 8th Cavalry Division (German Empire)
- 8th SS Cavalry Division Florian Geyer, Germany
- 8th Cavalry Division (Russian Empire)
- 8th Guards Cavalry Division, Soviet Union

== Armoured divisions ==
- 8th Armored Brigade (People's Republic of China), originally the 8th Tank Division
- 8th Armoured Division (South Africa)
- 8th Armoured Division (Syria)
- 8th Armoured Division (United Kingdom)
- 8th Armored Division (United States)
- 8th Panzer Division, Wehrmacht, Germany

== Aviation divisions ==
- 8th Bomber Division, People's Republic of China
- 8th Fighter Division, Germany
- 8th Air Division, United States

== Other divisions ==
- 8th Division of Xinjiang Production and Construction Corps, People's Republic of China
- 8th Flak Division, Germany
- 8th Rocket Division, Soviet Union
- 8th Anti-Aircraft Division, United Kingdom
- 8th Naval Raid Protection Ships Division, Ukraine

== Non-military uses ==
- Butterfield Overland Mail 8th Division
- Division 8 (Swedish football)
- (various places in Canada)

== See also ==
- Eighth Army (disambiguation)
- VIII Corps (disambiguation)
- 8th Brigade (disambiguation)
- 8th Regiment (disambiguation)
- 8 Squadron (disambiguation)
