= VIII Corps =

8th Corps, Eighth Corps, or VIII Corps may refer to:

== Germany ==
- VIII Army Corps (German Confederation)
- VIII Corps (German Empire), Imperial German Army, prior to and during World War I
- VIII Reserve Corps, Imperial German Army, World War I
- 8th Air Corps
- VIII Army Corps (Wehrmacht)

== Russia and Soviet Union ==
- 8th Army Corps (Russian Empire)
- 8th Air Defence Corps
- 8th Cavalry Corps
- 8th Guards Mechanized Corps
- 8th Mechanized Corps
- 8th Estonian Rifle Corps

== Ukraine ==
- 8th Air Assault Corps
- 8th Army Corps (Ukraine)

== United Kingdom ==
- VIII Corps (United Kingdom)

=== Artillery Volunteer Corps ===
- 8th (South Hall) Argyllshire Artillery Volunteer Corps
- 8th (Hayle Foundry) Cornwall Artillery Volunteer Corps
- 8th (Woodbury) Devonshire Artillery Volunteer Corps
- 8th (Leven) Fife Artillery Volunteer Corps
- 8th (Ironmongers) Lanarkshire Artillery Volunteer Corps
- 8th (Evie) Orkney Artillery Volunteer Corps
- 8th (Halifax) Yorkshire (West Riding) Artillery Volunteer Corps

=== Rifle Volunteer Corps ===
- 8th (Llanrwst) Denbighshire Rifle Volunteer Corps
- 8th (Dove Valley) Derbyshire Rifle Volunteer Corps
- 8th (Buckerell) Devonshire Rifle Volunteer Corps
- 8th (Driffield) Yorkshire (East Riding) Rifle Volunteer Corps
- 8th (Tewkesbury) Gloucestershire Rifle Volunteer Corps
- 8th (Freshwater) Isle of Wight Rifle Volunteer Corps
- 8th Kent (Sydenham) Rifle Volunteer Corps
- 8th Lanarkshire Rifle Volunteer Corps
- 8th (Ashby de la Zouch) Leicestershire Rifle Volunteer Corps
- 8th (Daventry) Northamptonshire Rifle Volunteer Corps
- 8th (Walker) Northumberland Rifle Volunteer Corps
- 8th Surrey Rifle Volunteer Corps
- 8th (Storrington) Sussex Rifle Volunteer Corps
- 8th Yorkshire West Riding Rifle Volunteer Corps

== United States ==
- VIII Corps (United States)
- VIII Corps (Union Army), a unit in the American Civil War
- Eighth Army Corps (Spanish–American War)

== Other countries ==
- 8th Army Corps (Republic of China)
- VIII Corps (Grande Armée), a unit of the Imperial French army during the Napoleonic Wars
- VIII Army Corps (Italy)
- VIII Corps (Ottoman Empire)
- 8th Corps (Turkey)
- 8th Corps (Yugoslav Partisans)

== See also ==
- List of military corps by number
- 8th Army (disambiguation)
- 8th Brigade (disambiguation)
- 8th Division (disambiguation)
- 8th Regiment (disambiguation)
- 8th Squadron (disambiguation)
- 8th (disambiguation)
