= Eighth Army =

Eighth Army may refer to:

== Germany ==
- 8th Army (German Empire)
- 8th Army (Wehrmacht)

== Russia/Soviet Union ==
- 8th Army (RSFSR), a unit of the Red Army during the Russian Civil War
- 8th Army (Russian Empire)
- 8th Army (Soviet Union)
- 8th Air Defence Army
- 8th Air Army
- 8th Guards Combined Arms Army, a unit of the Soviet Army
- 8th Guards Combined Arms Army (Russia)
- 8th Tank Army

== Other countries ==
- Eighth Route Army, a unit of the National Revolutionary Army during World War II
- Eighth Area Army, a unit of the Imperial Japanese Army during World War II
- 8th Army (France)
- 8th Army (Italy)
- Eighth Army (Ottoman Empire)
- Eighth Army (United Kingdom)
- Eighth Army (United States)

== Other uses ==
- 8th Army (board game), a 1982 board wargame
- Eighth Army of Liberation, a political party in Saint Vincent and the Grenadines
- Little 8th Route Army, a 1973 Chinese animated film

== See also ==
- List of armies by number
- VIII Corps (disambiguation)
- 8th Division (disambiguation)
- 8th Brigade (disambiguation)
- 8th Regiment (disambiguation)
- 8th Squadron (disambiguation)
- 8th (disambiguation)
