= 8th Rifle Division =

8th Rifle Division can refer to:

- 8th Guards Motor Rifle Division
- 8th Motor Rifle Division NKVD
- 8th Rifle Division (Soviet Union)
- 8th Siberian Rifle Division

== See also ==
- 8th Division (disambiguation)
- 8th Rifle Corps, Soviet Union
