= 8th Infantry =

8th Infantry may refer to:

- 8th Infantry Regiment (disambiguation)
- 8th Infantry Brigade (disambiguation)
- 8th Infantry Division (disambiguation)

== See also ==
- 8th (disambiguation)
