= Alberto Ferrero (general) =

Italian general (1885–1969)

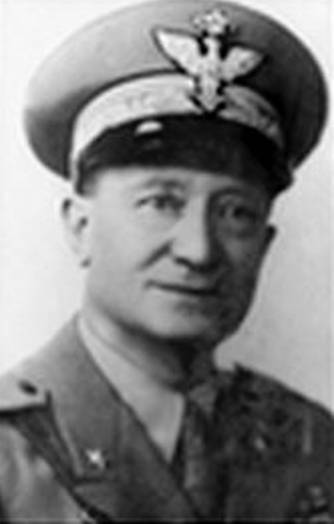
- Born: 27 October 1885; Bricherasio, Kingdom of Italy
- Died: 9 March 1969 (aged 83); Turin, Italy
- Military career
- Allegiance: Kingdom of Italy
- Branch: Royal Italian Army
- Rank: Lieutenant General
- Commands: 1st Alpini Regiment; 4th Alpine Division "Cuneense"; XXIII Army Corps
- Conflicts: Italo-Turkish War; Battle of Rhodes; World War I; World War II; Battle of the Western Alps; Greco-Italian War
- Awards: Bronze Medal of Military Valor

Alberto Ferrero (Bricherasio, 27 October 1885 – Turin, 9 March 1969) was an Italian general during World War II.

== Biography ==
After entering the Military Academy of Modena on 3 November 1905, he graduated as second lieutenant on 5 September 1907, assigned to the 3rd Alpini Regiment. As a lieutenant he participated in the Italo-Turkish War with the "Fenestrelle" Alpini Battalion in Cyrenaica in 1911–1912, and later in the Dodecanese, participating in the capture of Rhodes where he earned a Bronze Medal of Military Valor. He then participated in the Great War with the 5th Alpini Regiment, as a captain and later major (from 1917); in 1919–1920 he served in the 1st Alpini Regiment before being assigned to the Army Staff in Rome.

After a long period of illness, he resumed service at the headquarters of the Army Corps of Turin in 1924; in 1926 he was promoted to lieutenant colonel and then transferred to the War School, where he became a teacher. As a colonel he commanded the 1st Alpini Regiment in 1933, and from 20 October 1936 he was the Head of the Services Office of the General Staff in Rome. After promotion to brigadier general in 1937 he became acting commander of the 4th Alpine Division "Cuneense" until 9 December 1938, when he was assigned to the Ministry of War.

Following his promotion to major general on 10 June 1940, he returned to the command of the "Cuneense", participating in operations against France after Italy's entry into the Second World War and then on the Greek-Albanian front from December 1940 to 16 March 1941, when he left this command to take on the post of Chief of Staff of the Armed Forces High Command of Albania, receiving the surrender of the Greek Army on the following 23 April, along with General Alfred Jodl, after the German intervention. From 5 June 1941 he commanded the Higher Institute of War, and from 18 June 1942 he assumed command of the newly established XXIII Army Corps, stationed in Istria and the Julian March (being promoted to lieutenant general for war merit on 7 December 1942), until the proclamation of the armistice of Cassibile on 8 September 1943.

After the proclamation of the armistice, he rejected offers local anti-Fascist volunteers to fight against the Germans (he claimed that he would have armed them, provided that they fought in uniform, but that both the uniforms and the weapons for them were kept in depots whose keys had been lost), entered into negotiations with the Germans and relocated his headquarters from Trieste, which he deemed indefensible, to Cervignano and later to San Donà di Piave. Trieste was then occupied without resistance, and Ferrero's 55,000 troops, left without orders, were disarmed and deported to Germany.
