= 4th Alpine Division "Cuneense" =

Unit of the Royal Italian Army(1935-1943)

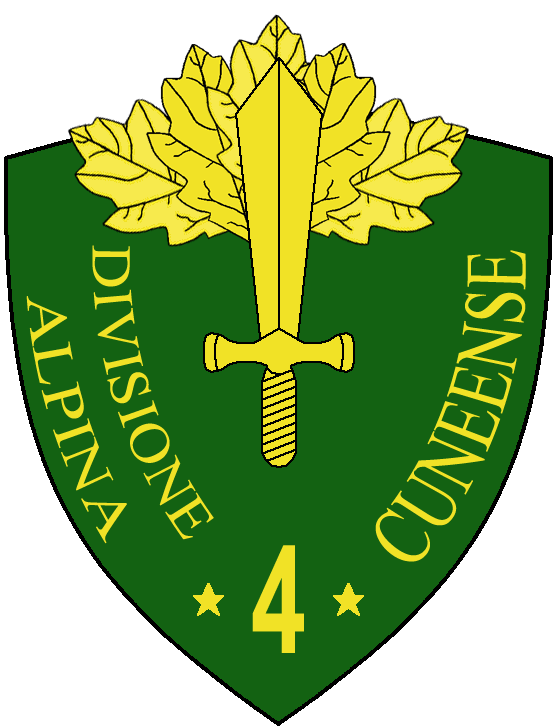
- 4th Alpine Division "Cuneense" insignia
- Active: 31 October 1935 – 28 January 1943
- Country: Kingdom of Italy
- Branch: Royal Italian Army
- Type: Alpini
- Role: Mountain Infantry
- Size: 17,460 men
- Part of: Italian Alpine Corps; 1942-1943
- Garrison/HQ: Cuneo
- Engagements: World War II; Greco-Italian War; Italian War in Soviet Union

Commanders
- Notable commanders: General Emilio Battisti

Insignia
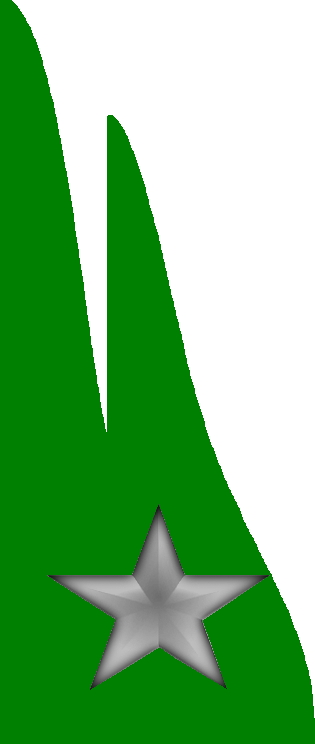
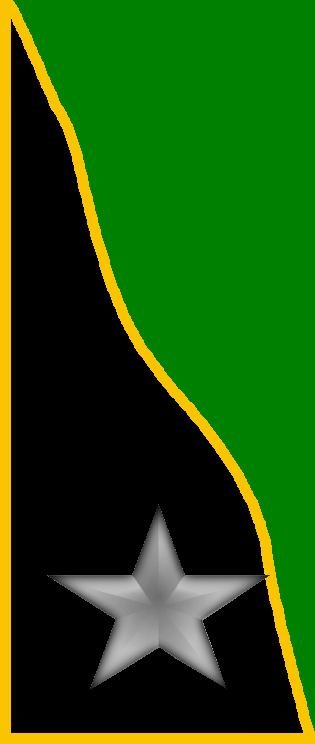
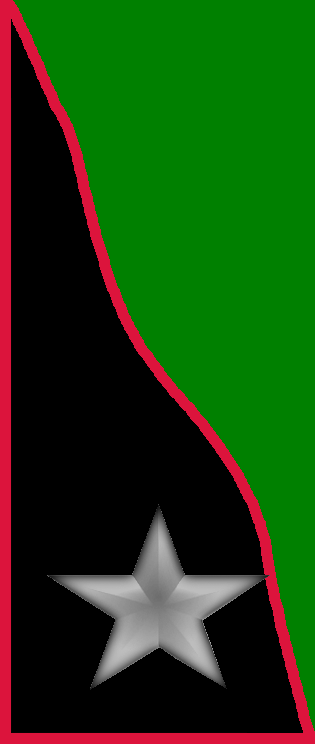
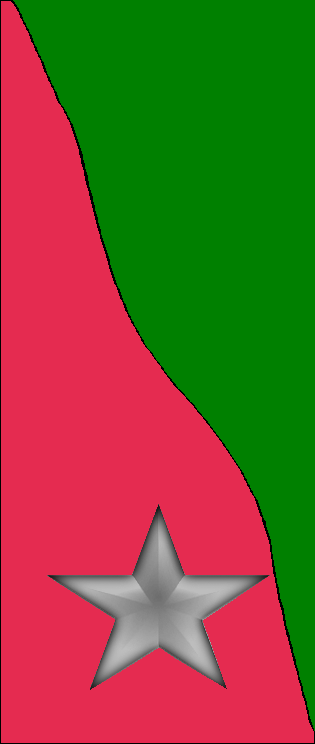
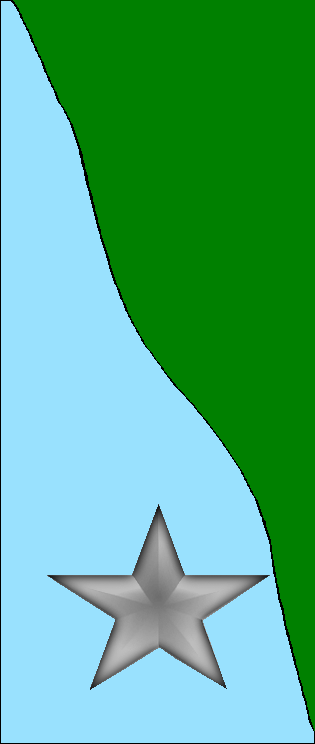
- Identification symbol: Cuneense Division gorget patches

The 4th Alpine Division "Cuneense" (Italian: 4ª Divisione alpina "Cuneense") was a division of the Royal Italian Army during World War II, which specialized in mountain warfare. The headquarters of the division was in the city of Cuneo, and the majority of its Alpini soldiers were drafted from the surrounding Province of Cuneo - hence the division's name "Cuneense". The division participated in all Italian World War II campaigns with the exception of the North African Campaign. The division was annihilated during Operation Little Saturn by Soviet forces in January 1943.

== History ==
The division's lineage begins on 19 October 1933 when the 1st Alpini Regiment in Mondovì and 2nd Alpini Regiment in Cuneo left the 1st Alpine Division "Taurinense" and entered the newly raised IV Alpine Brigade in Cuneo. On 1 January 1934 the newly formed 4th Mountain Artillery Regiment in Cuneo joined the brigade. On 27 October 1934 the brigade changed its name to IV Superior Alpine Command, which received the name Cuneense in December of the same year (Italian: IV Comando Superiore Alpino "Cuneense").

On 31 October 1935 the IV Superior Alpine Command "Cuneense" was reorganized as 4th Alpine Division "Cuneense" with the 1st and 2nd Alpini regiments and the 4th Alpine Artillery Regiment "Cuneense". On 25 December 1935 the Cuneense temporarily transferred its Alpini battalions "Pieve di Teco" and "Saluzzo" and its 11th Mountain Artillery Battery to the 5th Alpine Division "Pusteria" for the Second Italo-Ethiopian War.

=== World War II ===
==== Invasion of France ====
The division participated in the Italian invasion of France in June 1940. On 22 June it entered French territory in the Chabriere and Mary valleys.

==== Greco-Italian War ====
In December 1940 the division was sent as reinforcements to Albania for the Greco-Italian War. Between 15 and 17 December 1940 the division's units entered the front in the upper Devoll valley. On 18 March 1941 the division was taken out of the front and sent to Berat. At the end of March the division deployed to the Yugoslav-Albanian border for the upcoming Invasion of Yugoslavia. On 10 April the division crossed the border and advanced to Debar in Macedonia. After the war's conclusion the division returned to Italy in May 1941.

==== Soviet Union ====
The Cuneense was one of the ten Italian divisions of the Italian Army in Russia, which fought on the Eastern Front. In July 1942 the division, together with the 2nd Alpine Division "Tridentina" and the 3rd Alpine Division "Julia" formed the Alpine Army Corps, which was transferred to Eastern Ukraine. In July 1942 the division arrived in Izium from where it marched eastwards to Millerovo and then onward to the Don river. The Italian units covered part of the left flank of the German 6th Army, which spearheaded the German summer offensive of 1942 into the city of Stalingrad.

On 12 December 1942 the Red Army's Operation Little Saturn commenced, which in its first stage attacked and encircled the Italian Army in Russia's II Army Corps and XXXV Army Corps. On 13 January 1943, the Red Army launched the second stage of Operation Little Saturn: four armies of General Filipp Golikov's Voronezh Front attacked, encircled, and destroyed the Hungarian Second Army near Svoboda on the Don to the northwest of the Alpine Army Corps and pushed back the remaining units of the German XXIV Army Corps on the Alpine Army Corps' left flank, thus encircling the Alpine Army Corps.

On the evening of 17 January, the Alpine Army Corps commander, General Gabriele Nasci, ordered a full retreat. At this point only the Tridentina division was still capable of conducting effective combat operations. The 40,000-strong mass of stragglers — Alpini and Italians from other commands, plus German and Hungarian Hussars — formed two columns that followed the Tridentina division which, supported by a handful of German armored vehicles, led the way westwards to the Axis lines. As the Soviets had already occupied every village bitter battles had to be fought to clear the way. On the morning of 28 January the Cuneense had walked 200 km, fought 20 battles, lost 80% of its men and spent 11 nights camped out in the middle of the Russian Steppe. Temperatures during the nights were between −30 °C and −40 °C. On 28 January the last remnants of the division were annihilated by Cossack forces. The last survivors of the 1st Alpini regiment burned the regiment's flag to prevent it from falling into enemy hands. The Cuneense then ceased to exist.

==== Casualties ====
On 11 February 1943 the count of the survivors gave the following result:

- 1st Alpini Regiment out of 5,282 men: 722 survivors; none of the soldiers of the battalions Ceva, Pieve di Teco and Mondovì survived.
- 2nd Alpini Regiment out of 5,229 men: 208 survivors; none of the soldiers of the battalions Borgo San Dalmazzo and Saluzzo survived.
- 4th Alpine Artillery Regiment out of 3,616 men: 379 survivors; none of the soldiers of the Artillery Group "Mondovì" survived.
- 4th Mixed Engineer Battalion out of 1,240 men: 139 survivors
- Support units out of 1,313 men: 159 survivors

In total 1,607 men of the division's total of 17,460 survived Operation Little Saturn.

==== Return to Italy ====
The remnants of the division were repatriated in March 1943 and the division was reformed on 1 May 1943 in Bolzano with troops of the 1st Alpini "Valley" Group of the 6th Alpine Division "Alpi Graie" and with the 104th Marching Alpini Regiment of the 8th Marching Division. After the announcement of the Armistice of Cassibile on 8 September 1943 the invading German forces disbanded the division.

== Organization ==
4th Alpine Division "Cuneense" organization during the campaign on the Eastern Front

In late 1942 the division consisted of the following units:

- 4th Alpine Division "Cuneense", in Cuneo
  - Headquarters
    - Command Company
    - 413th Carabinieri Section, in Cuneo
    - 414th Carabinieri Section, in Cuneo
    - 203rd Field Post Office, in Cuneo
    - 4th Alpine Division Command Transport Squad, in Cuneo
  - 1st Alpini Regiment, in Mondovì
    - Command Company, in Mondovì
    - Alpini Battalion "Ceva", in Ceva
      - Command Company, in Ceva
      - 1st Company, in Ceva
      - 4th Company, in Bagnasco
      - 5th Company, in Ceva
      - 101st Support Weapons Company, in Ceva (Breda M37 machine guns, 45mm mod. 35 and 81mm mod. 35 mortars)
    - Alpini Battalion "Pieve di Teco", in Chiusa Pesio
      - Command Company, in Chiusa Pesio
      - 2nd Company, in Chiusa Pesio
      - 3rd Company, in Chiusa Pesio
      - 8th Company, in Roccaforte Mondovì
      - 102nd Support Weapons Company, in Chiusa Pesio (Breda M37 machine guns, 45mm mod. 35 and 81mm mod. 35 mortars)
    - Alpini Battalion "Mondovì", in Mondovì
      - Command Company, in Mondovì
      - 9th Company, in Torre Mondovì
      - 10th Company, in San Michele Mondovì
      - 11th Company, in Vicoforte
      - 103rd Support Weapons Company, in Vicoforte (Breda M37 machine guns, 45mm mod. 35 and 81mm mod. 35 mortars)
    - 84th Cannons Company, in Mondovì (47/32 mod. 35 anti-tank guns; formed by the regiment for the campaign in the Soviet Union)
    - 1st Supply Section, in Beinette
    - 21st Train Section, in San Bernolfo Mondovì (equipped with mules)
    - 1st Medical Section (includes the 612th Field Hospital), in Mondovì
  - 2nd Alpini Regiment, in Cuneo
    - Command Company, in Cuneo
    - Alpini Battalion "Borgo San Dalmazzo", in Cuneo
      - Command Company, in Cuneo
      - 13th Company, in Cuneo
      - 14th Company, in Cuneo
      - 15th Company, in Cuneo
      - 104th Support Weapons Company, in Cuneo (Breda M37 machine guns, 45mm mod. 35 and 81mm mod. 35 mortars)
    - Alpini Battalion "Dronero", in Dronero
      - Command Company, in Dronero
      - 17th Company, in Dronero
      - 18th Company, in San Damiano Macra
      - 19th Company, in Dronero
      - 105th Support Weapons Company, in Dronero (Breda M37 machine guns, 45mm mod. 35 and 81mm mod. 35 mortars)
    - Alpini Battalion "Saluzzo", in Vinadio
      - Command Company, in Vinadio
      - 21st Company, in Vinadio
      - 22nd Company, in Demonte
      - 23nd Company, in Demonte
      - 106th Support Weapons Company, in Demonte (Breda M37 machine guns, 45mm mod. 35 and 81mm mod. 35 mortars)
    - 14th Cannons Company, in Cuneo (47/32 mod. 35 anti-tank guns; formed by the regiment for the campaign in the Soviet Union)
    - 2nd Supply Section, in Dronero
    - 22nd Train Section, in Bene Vagienna (equipped with mules)
    - 2nd Medical Section (includes the 615th Field Hospital), in Cuneo
  - 4th Alpine Artillery Regiment, in Cuneo
    - Command Unit, in Cuneo
    - Alpine Artillery Group "Pinerolo", in Beinette (75/13 mod. 15 mountain guns)
      - 7th Battery, in Beinette
      - 8th Battery, in Borgo San Dalmazzo
      - 9th Battery, in Boves
      - Ammunition and Supply Unit, in Crava
    - Alpine Artillery Group "Mondovì", in Mondovì (75/13 mod. 15 mountain guns)
      - 10th Battery, in Villanova Mondovì
      - 11th Battery, in Mondovì
      - 12th Battery, in Villanova Mondovì
      - Ammunition and Supply Unit, in Magliano Alpi
    - Alpine Artillery Group "Val Po", in Piasco (assigned in April 1942 for deployment to the Soviet Union; 105/11 mod. 28 mountain guns)
      - 72nd Battery, in Piasco
      - 73rd Battery, in Verzuolo
      - Ammunition and Supply Unit, in Manta
    - 64th Anti-aircraft Battery, in Fontanelle Boves (20/65 mod. 35 anti-aircraft guns; assigned for the campaign in the Soviet Union)
    - 78th Anti-tank Battery (75/39 anti-tank guns; assigned for the campaign in the Soviet Union)
    - 116th Anti-aircraft Battery, in Fontanelle Boves (20/65 mod. 35 anti-aircraft guns; assigned for the campaign in the Soviet Union)
  - IV Mixed Engineer Battalion, in Peveragno
    - Command Platoon, in Peveragno
    - 104th Searchlight Section, Peveragno
    - 114th Telegraph and Radio Operators Company, in Peveragno
    - 124th Engineer Company, in Peveragno
  - 2nd Train Column (expanded to 2nd Train Unit for the campaign in the Soviet Union; both units equipped with mules)
  - 107th Supply Section, in Chiusa Pesio
  - 201st Mixed Transport Unit
    - 121st Mixed Transport Section
    - 701st Heavy Transport Section
    - 702nd Heavy Transport Section
    - 947th Heavy Transport Section
  - 306th Medical Section, in Cuneo
    - 613th Field Hospital, in Cuneo
    - 614th Field Hospital, in Cuneo
    - 616th Field Hospital, in Cuneo
    - 617th Field Hospital, in Cuneo

The division strength was 573 officers and 16,887 NCOs and soldiers for a total strength of 17,460 men. The division also had 176 horses, 4,698 mules and 584 transport vehicles at its disposal.

== Military honors ==
For their conduct during the Italian campaign in the Soviet Union the President of Italy awarded on 31 December 1947 to the three regiments of the 4th Alpine Division "Cuneense" Italy's highest military honor, the Gold Medal of Military Valor.

- 1st Alpini Regiment on 5 March 1949
- 2nd Alpini Regiment on 5 March 1949
- 4th Alpine Artillery Regiment on 5 March 1949

== Commanding officers ==
The division's commanding officers were:

- Generale di Divisione Umberto Testa (1935 - 1937)
- Generale di Brigata Alberto Ferrero (1937 - 9 September 1938)
- Generale di Brigata Giovanni Maccario (10 September 1938 - 9 September 1939)
- Generale di Brigata Achille d'Havet (10 September 1939 - 10 June 1940)
- Generale di Divisione Alberto Ferrero (11 June 1940 - 15 February 1941)
- Colonel Armando Pezzana (acting, 16 February 1941 - 10 March 1941)
- Generale di Divisione Emilio Battisti (11 March 1941 - 27 January 1943) POW
- Generale di Divisione Carlo Fassi (15 May 1943 - 9 September 1943)

== Sources ==
- Homepage of the 4th Alpine Division Cuneense
