= 2nd Alpini Regiment =

Active Italian Army mountain infantry unit

- 2° Reggimento Alpini
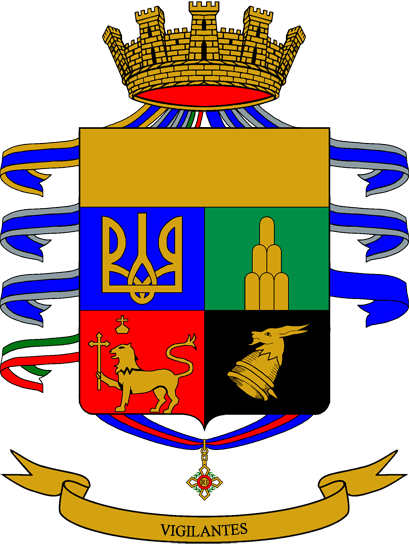
- Regimental coat of arms
- Active: 1 Nov. 1882 – 10 Sept. 1943; 1 July 1963 – 31 Oct. 1974; 10 Oct. 1975 – today
- Country: Italy
- Branch: Italian Army
- Type: Mountain Infantry
- Part of: Alpine Brigade "Taurinense"
- Garrison/HQ: Cuneo
- Motto: "Vigilantes"
- Anniversaries: 6 June 1916
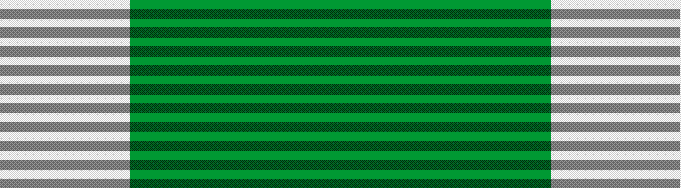
- Decorations: 1× Military Order of Italy; 1× Gold Medal of Military Valor; 4× Silver Medals of Military Valor; 1× Bronze Medal of Military Valor; 1× Bronze Medal of Civil Valor; 1× Italian Red Cross Bronze Medal of Merit; 1× Silver Medal of Merit

Insignia
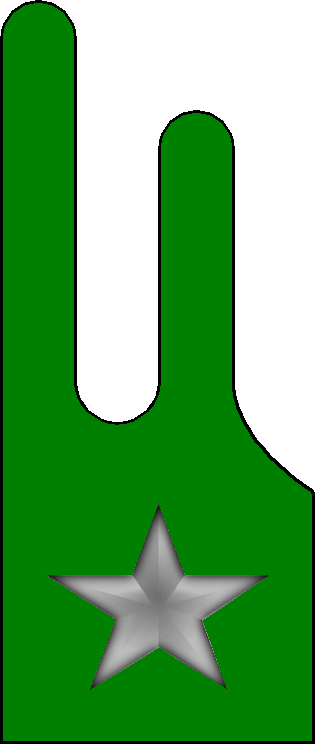
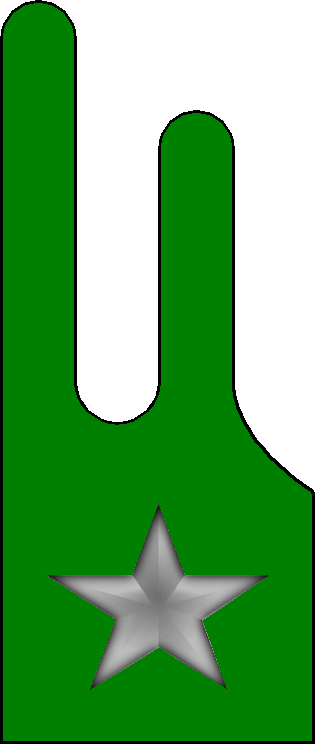
- Alpini gorget patches

The 2nd Alpini Regiment (Italian: 2° Reggimento Alpini) is a mountain warfare regiment of the Italian Army based in Cuneo in Piedmont. The regiment belongs to the Italian Army's Alpini infantry speciality and is assigned to the Alpine Brigade "Taurinense". On 1 November 1882, the Royal Italian Army formed the 2nd Alpini Regiment, which had its recruiting area in the Maritime Alps and Cottian Alps. During World War I the regiment expanded to ten battalions, which fought separately in the alpine areas of the Italian front.

In 1935 the regiment was assigned to the 4th Alpine Division "Cuneense", with which it served during World War II in the invasion of France and the Greco-Italian War. In summer 1942 the division was transferred to the Eastern Front in the Soviet Union, where it was destroyed in winter 1942–43 during the Soviet Operation Little Saturn. The remnants of the division were repatriated in spring 1943. For its service and sacrifice on the Eastern Front the 2nd Alpini Regiment was awarded Italy's highest military honor the Gold Medal of Military Valor. On 8 September 1943, the Armistice of Cassibile was announced and two days later, on 10 September 1943, invading German forces disbanded the 2nd Alpini Regiment.

In 1963 the regiment was reformed as a training unit in Cuneo. In 1974, the regiment was disbanded, and two years later the flag and traditions of the regiment were assigned to the Alpini Battalion "Saluzzo", which had become an autonomous unit in October 1975 and was assigned to the Alpine Brigade "Taurinense". In 1992, the regiment was reformed. The regiment's anniversary falls on 6 June 1916, the height of the Battle of Asiago, during which four of the regiment's battalions earned a Silver Medal of Military Valor for holding Monte Fior and Monte Castelgomberto.

== History ==
On 15 October 1872, the Royal Italian Army formed 15 locally recruited Alpini companies in the alpine regions of Northern Italy. Nine more companies were formed the following year. In 1875 the 24 companies were organized into seven battalions, and in 1878 the companies were increased to 36 and the battalions to ten. On 1 November 1882, the Alpini companies were increased to 72 and grouped into 20 battalions. On the same date the battalions were assigned to six newly formed Alpini regiments, which were numbered 1st to 6th from West to East, while companies were numbered from 1 to 72 from to West to East. Upon entering the regiments, the battalions, which until then had been designated by a Roman numeral, were named for their recruiting zone, while the Alpini companies were renumbered sequentially from 1st to 72nd. One of the six Alpini regiments formed on 1 November 1882 was the 2nd Alpini Regiment, which was formed in Bra in Southern Piedmont. The new regiment received the Battalion "Val Pesio", which recruited along the Pesio river in Southern Piedmont, the Battalion "Col Tenda", which recruited in the Vermenagna Valley that leads to the Col de Tende pass, and the Battalion "Val Schio", which recruited in the Schio Valley in Veneto.

- 2nd Alpini Regiment, in Bra
  - Battalion "Val Pesio", in Mondovì
    - 8th, 9th, 10th, and 11th Company
  - Battalion "Col Tenda", in Borgo San Dalmazzo
    - 12th, 13th, 14th, and 15th Company
  - Battalion "Val Schio", in Vicenza
    - 59th, 60th, and 61st Company

On 1 April 1885, the regiment transferred the Battalion "Val Pesio" to the 1st Alpini Regiment and the Battalion "Val Schio" to the 6th Alpini Regiment. In turn the regiment received from the 3rd Alpini Regiment the Battalion "Val Stura", which recruited in the Stura Valley, and the Battalion "Val Maira", which recruited in the Maira Valley. The Battalion "Val Stura" had been awarded a Bronze Medal of Civil Valor in 1883, which was affixed to the flag of the 2nd Alpini Regiment, when the battalion joined the regiment. On 1 November 1886, the battalions changed their names from their recruiting zones to the cities and towns, where their base was located. At the same time Alpini soldiers and non-commissioned officers were issued thread tufts, called Nappina in Italian, which were clipped to the Cappello Alpino headdress, and colored white for the troops of a regiment's first battalion, red for the troops of a regiment's second battalion, green for the troops of a regiment's third battalion, and blue for the troops of a regiment's fourth battalion. The 2nd Alpini Regiment consisted afterwards of the following units:

- 2nd Alpini Regiment, in Bra
  - Alpini Battalion "Borgo San Dalmazzo", in Borgo San Dalmazzo (former Battalion "Col Tenda")
    - 12th, 13th, 14th, and 15th Alpini Company
  - Alpini Battalion "Vinadio", in Vinadio (former Battalion "Val Stura")
    - 16th, 17th, 18th, and 19th Alpini Company
  - Alpini Battalion "Dronero", in Dronero (former Battalion "Val Maira")
    - 20th, 21st, 22nd, and 23rd Alpini Company

In 1895–96 the regiment provided 22 officers and 611 troops to help form the I, III and IV provisional Alpini battalions, which were deployed to Eritrea for the First Italo-Ethiopian War. In 1901 the regiment moved from Bra to Cuneo. The same year the regiment as assigned together with the 1st Alpini Regiment to the I Alpini Group, which on 9 August 1910 was renamed I Alpine Brigade. In 1904 the Alpini Battalion "Vinadio" moved from Vinadio to Dronero, while the Alpini Battalion "Dronero" moved from Dronero to Saluzzo. Consequently the two battalions were renamed Alpini Battalion "Dronero" and Alpini Battalion "Saluzzo". In January 1908, the regiment transferred the 12th Alpini Company of the Alpini Battalion "Borgo San Dalmazzo" to 7th Alpini Regiment to help form the Alpini Battalion "Tolmezzo". In December 1908 the regiment was deployed to the area of the Strait of Messina for the recovery efforts after the 1908 Messina earthquake. For its service the regiment was awarded a Silver Medal of Merit, which was affixed to the regiment's flag. In October 1909, the regiment transferred the 16th Alpini Company of the Alpini Battalion "Dronero" and the 20th Alpini Company of the Alpini Battalion "Saluzzo" to 8th Alpini Regiment to help form the Alpini Battalion "Cividale". In 1911, the Alpini Battalion "Saluzzo" was deployed to Libya for the Italo-Turkish War, where it fought in the Battle of Derna. During the war the 2nd Alpini Regiment also provided 1 officer and 207 troops to augment other units fighting in the war.

=== World War I ===
At the outbreak of World War I the Alpini speciality consisted of eight regiments, which fielded 26 battalions with 79 companies. Each Alpini battalion, with the exception of the Alpini Battalion "Verona", fielded three Alpini companies, while the Alpini Battalion "Verona" fielded four companies. Each company consisted of one captain, four lieutenants and 250 other ranks. After Italy's initial declaration of neutrality 38 additional Alpini companies were formed during the autumn of 1914 with men, who had completed their military service in the preceding four years. These companies were numbered from 80th to 117th and assigned to the existing Alpini battalions. In January 1915, each Alpini battalion formed a reserve battalion, with men, who had completed their military service at least four years, but not more than eleven years prior. These reserve battalions were named for a valley (Italian: Valle; abbreviated Val) located near their associated regular Alpini battalion's base, and the reserve battalions received the same Nappina as their associated regular Alpini battalion. The companies of the Valle battalions were numbered from 201st to 281st, with the numbers 227th, 233rd, 237th, 271st, and 273rd unused.

On 23 May 1915, Italy declared war on Austria-Hungary and at the time the 2nd Alpini Regiment consisted of the following units:

- 2nd Alpini Regiment, in Cuneo
  - Alpini Battalion "Borgo San Dalmazzo"
    - 13th, 14th, 15th, 99th, and 117th Alpini Company
  - Alpini Battalion "Dronero"
    - 17th, 18th, 19th, 81st, and 101st Alpini Company
  - Alpini Battalion "Saluzzo"
    - 21st, 22nd, 23rd, 80th, and 100th Alpini Company
  - Alpini Battalion "Val Stura"
    - 213th, 214th, and 215th Alpini Company
  - Alpini Battalion "Val Maira"
    - 217th, 218th, and 219th Alpini Company
  - Alpini Battalion "Val Varaita"
    - 221st, 222nd, and 223rd Alpini Company

By the end of 1915 the Alpini regiments began to form additional companies with recruits born in 1896. These new companies were numbered from 118th to 157th and were used, together with the 38 companies formed earlier, to form an additional reserve battalion for each regular battalion. These new battalions were named for a mountain (Italian: Monte) located near their associated regular Alpini battalion's base, and the reserve battalions received the same Nappina as their associated regular Alpini battalion. The 2nd Alpini Regiment thus added the following Monte battalions:

- Alpini Battalion "Monte Argentera"
  - 99th, 117th, and 122nd Alpini Company
- Alpini Battalion "Bicocca"
  - 81st, 101st, and 123rd Alpini Company
- Alpini Battalion "Monviso"
  - 80th, 100th, and 124th Alpini Company

As the mountainous terrain of the Italian front made the deployment of entire Alpini regiments impracticable, the regimental commands of the eight Alpini regiments were disbanded in March 1916. Likewise in April 1916 the pre-war alpine brigade commands were disbanded, and the personnel of the regimental commands and alpine brigade commands used to from twenty regiment-sized group commands and nine brigade-sized grouping commands. Afterwards Alpini battalions were employed either independently or assigned to groups, groupings, or infantry divisions as needed. In February and March 1917 the Royal Italian Army formed twelve skiers battalions, each with two skiers companies. On 21 May 1917, the VI Skiers Battalion was disbanded and its personnel used to form the Alpini Battalion "Cuneo", which was assigned to the 2nd Alpini Regiment and consisted of the 297th, 298th, and 299th Alpini companies. The battalion was associated with the Alpini Battalion "Borgo San Dalmazzo" and therefore its troops wore a white Nappina.

In November and December 1917, after the disastrous Battle of Caporetto, the following retreat to the Piave river, and the subsequent First Battle of the Piave River and First Battle of Monte Grappa, the Royal Italian Army disbanded twenty Alpini battalions, which had suffered heavy casualties during the battles and retreat. Among the twenty battalions were the following battalions of the 2nd Alpini Regiment:

- Alpini Battalion "Bicocca"; battalion annihilated during the retreat and disbanded on 25 November 1917, with the survivors assigned to the Alpini Battalion "Dronero"
- Alpini Battalion "Val Stura"; battalion annihilated during the retreat and disbanded on 25 November 1917, with the survivors assigned to the Alpini Battalion "Dronero"
- Alpini Battalion "Monte Argentera"; battalion annihilated during the retreat and disbanded on 30 November 1917
- Alpini Battalion "Monviso"; battalion annihilated during the retreat and disbanded on 30 November 1917

After the retreat to the Piave river the Alpini Battalion "Val Varaita" fought in December 1917 for control of Monte Asolone in the Monte Grappa massif, where the battalion suffered again heavy casualties. On 15 February 1918, the Alpini Battalion "Val Varaita" was one of further seven Alpini battalions to be disbanded and its remaining personnel was transferred to the Alpini Battalion "Fenestrelle" of the 3rd Alpini Regiment.

During the war 151 officers and 3,442 soldiers of the 2nd Alpini Regiment were killed in action, while 308 officers and 5,498 soldiers were wounded. For their service and sacrifice during the war six of the regiment's battalions were awarded a Silver Medal of Military Valor:

- the Alpini Battalion "Saluzzo" was awarded a Silver Medal of Military Valor for taking and holding the summit of Monte Čukla on 4–10 May 1916.
- the Alpini Battalion "Val Maira" was awarded a Silver Medal of Military Valor for its conduct on Monte Pasubio on 18–20 October 1916 and its conduct during the First Battle of Monte Grappa in the Val Calcino on 11–13 December 1917.
- the Alpini battalions "Val Maira", "Val Varaita", "Monte Argentera", and "Monviso" were awarded a shared Silver Medal of Military Valor for the battalions "Val Maira" and "Val Varaita" having taken and held the summits of Pal Piccolo, Freikofel and Pal Grande on 24 May – 4 July 1915, and for the four battalions having held their positions on Monte Fior and Monte Castelgomberto during the ferocious Austro-Hungarian Asiago Offensive on 6–8 June 1916.

The three Silver Medals of Military Valor were affixed to the 2nd Alpini Regiment's flag and added to the regiment's coat of arms.

=== Interwar years ===
After the end of the war the Alpini battalions "Val Maira" and "Cuneo" were disbanded, while the regiment's three remaining battalions "Borgo San Dalmazzo", "Dronero", and "Saluzzo" were sent to the Italian Protectorate of Albania to fight in the Vlora War. On 1 January 1920, the regimental command was reformed. The reformed regiment received the Alpini battalions "Ceva" and "Mondovì" from the 1st Alpini Regiment and transferred in turn its battalions "Dronero" and "Saluzzo" to the 1st Alpini Regiment. With the transfer of the battalions also the military awards of the battalions were transferred from regiment to regiment and affixed to the respective regimental flags. From December 1920 to January 1921 the battalions "Dronero" and "Saluzzo" were part of the campaign to defeat the Italian Regency of Carnaro. In 1921, the regiment was assigned to the 1st Alpine Division, which also included the 1st Alpini Regiment, 3rd Alpini Regiment, and 1st Mountain Artillery Regiment. On 1 February 1923, the regiment returned the Alpini battalions "Ceva" and "Mondovì" to the 1st Alpini Regiment and in turn received its two traditional battalions "Dronero" and "Saluzzo". During the same year the 1st Alpine Division was replaced by the I Alpini Grouping, which in 1926 was reorganized as I Alpine Brigade. The brigade included, besides the 2nd Alpini Regiment, also the 1st Alpini Regiment, 3rd Alpini Regiment, 4th Alpini Regiment, and 1st Mountain Artillery Regiment.

On 19 October 1933, I Alpine Brigade was split and the 2nd Alpini Regiment joined, together with the 1st Alpini Regiment, the newly formed IV Alpine Brigade, which was based in Cuneo. On 1 January 1934, the newly formed 4th Mountain Artillery Regiment joined the brigade, which on 27 October 1934 was renamed IV Superior Alpine Command. In December of the same year the command was given the name "Cuneense". On 31 October 1935, the IV Superior Alpine Command "Cuneense" was reorganized as 4th Alpine Division "Cuneense", which included 1st Alpini Regiment, 2nd Alpini Regiment, and 4th Alpine Artillery Regiment "Cuneense".

=== Second Italo-Ethiopian War ===
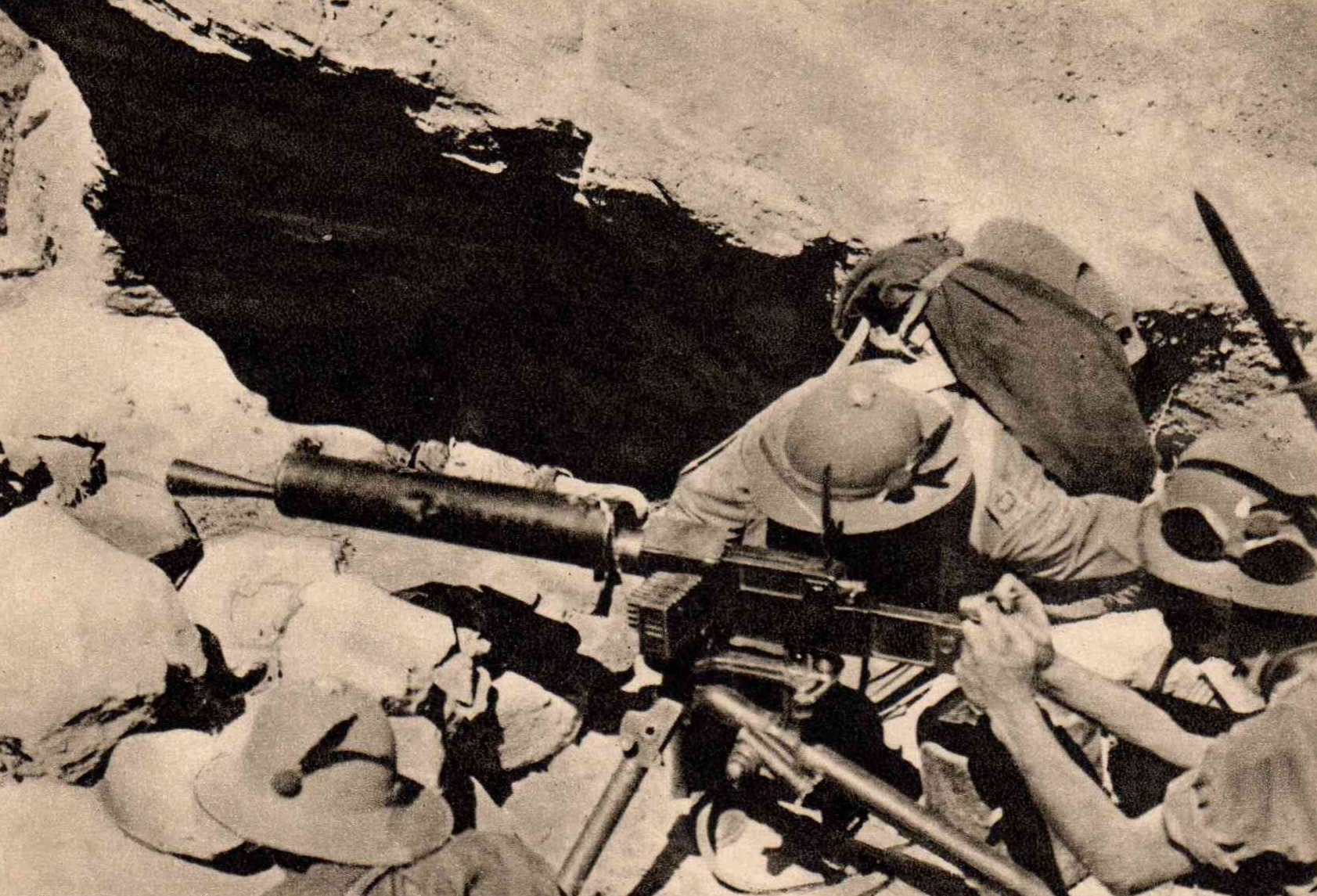
Alpini with a Fiat–Revelli Mod. 1914 machine gun during the Battle of Amba Aradam

On 1 October 1935, the 2nd Alpini Regiment reformed the Alpini Battalion "Val Varaita" in preparation to transfer the Alpini Battalion "Saluzzo" to the newly formed 11th Alpini Regiment, which was formed for the Second Italo-Ethiopian War. On 22 December 1935, the regiment transferred the "Saluzzo" to the 11th Alpini Regiment, which on 31 December of the same year was assigned to the newly formed 5th Alpine Division "Pusteria". On 6 January 1936, the "Pusteria" division's units embarked in Livorno and Naples for the transfer to Massawa in Eritrea. At the same time the 2nd Alpini Regiment provided seven officers and 507 troops to help form the 10th Supply Column and the 609th Company, which was assigned to the XI Replacements Battalion. The XI Replacements Battalion was attached to 11th Alpini Regiment, while the 10th Supply Column was attached to the 5th Alpine Division "Pusteria". Both units were soon shipped to East Africa. In Ethiopia the Alpini Battalion "Saluzzo" fought at Adi Gul, Amba Aradam, Maychew, and Amba Bohorà. For its service and conduct during the campaign the 11th Alpini Regiment was awarded a Bronze Medal of Military Valor. In April 1937, the Alpini Battalion "Saluzzo" returned to Italy and the Alpini Battalion "Val Varaita" was disbanded. With the return of the Alpini Battalion "Saluzzo" to the 2nd Alpini Regiment a duplicate of the Bronze Medal of Military Valor, which had been awarded to the 11th Alpini Regiment, was affixed to the flag of the 2nd Alpini Regiment and added to the regiment's coat of arms.

=== World War II ===
On 25 August 1939, shortly before the German Invasion of Poland, the Alpini battalions "Val Stura" and "Val Maira" were reformed with reservists. On 10 June 1940, the day Italy entered World War II, the regiment fielded 160 officers and 5,046 other ranks for a total strength of 5,206 men. The regiment had 23 horses, 1,242 mules and 109 transport vehicles at its disposal. The regiment's organization at the time was as follows:

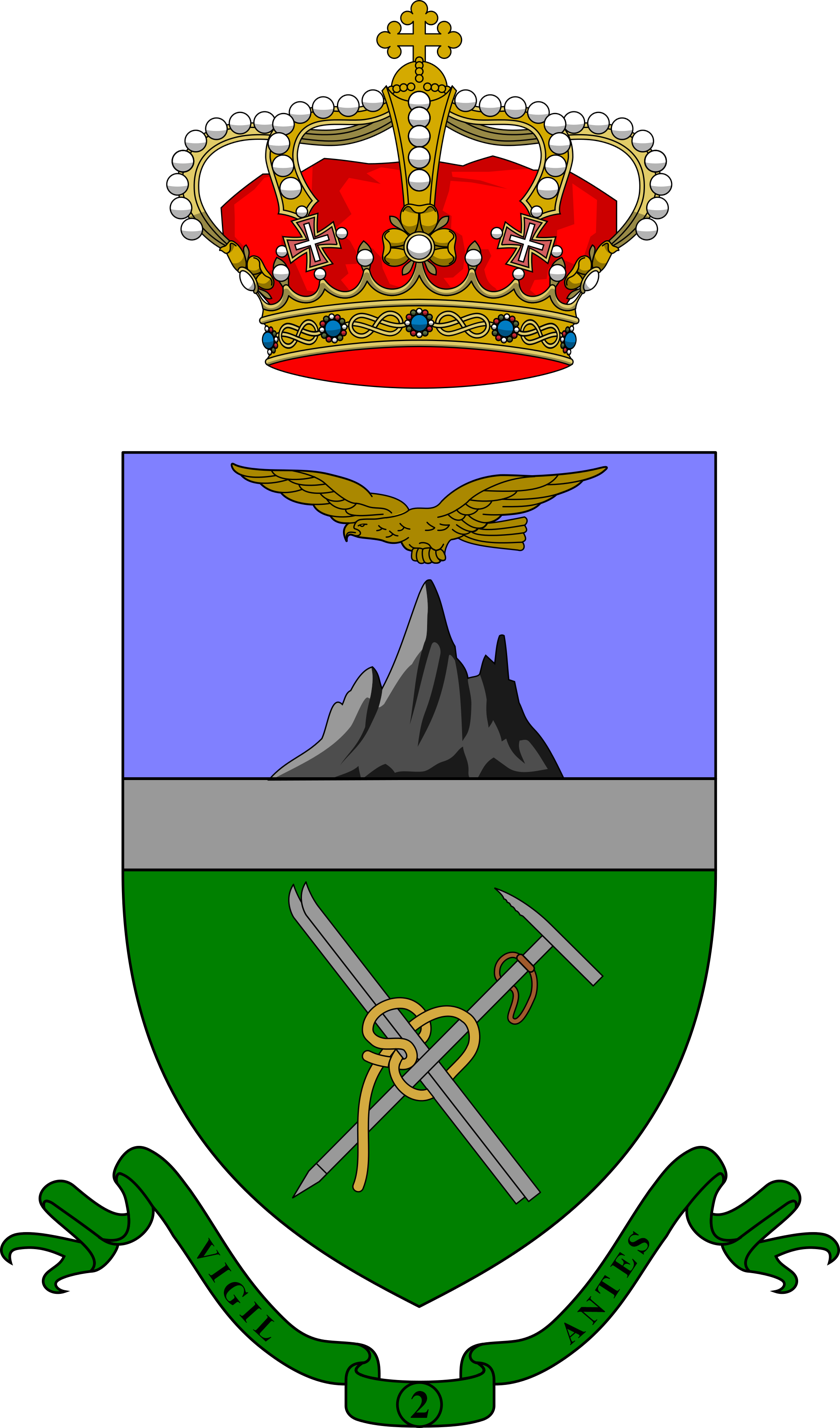
- 2nd Alpini Regiment, in Cuneo
  - Regimental Command Company, in Cuneo
  - Alpini Battalion "Borgo San Dalmazzo", in Cuneo
    - Command Company, in Cuneo, in Cuneo
    - 13th, 14th, and 15th Alpini Company, in Cuneo
  - Alpini Battalion "Dronero", in Dronero
    - Command Company, in Dronero
    - 17th and 19th Alpini Company, in Dronero
    - 18th Alpini Company, in San Damiano Macra
  - Alpini Battalion "Saluzzo", in Vinadio
    - Command Company, in Vinadio
    - 21st Alpini Company, in Vinadio
    - 22nd and 23rd Alpini Company, in Demonte
  - 2nd Supply Section, in Dronero
  - 2nd Medical Section, in Cuneo (includes the 615th Field Hospital in Dronero)
  - 22nd Train Section, in Bene Vagienna (equipped with mules)

In June 1940 the regiment participated in the invasion of France. After the Battle of France the Alpini battalions "Val Stura" and "Val Maira" were disbanded on 31 October 1940.

==== Greco-Italian War ====
In November 1940, the 4th Alpine Division "Cuneense" was transferred to Albania to shore up the crumbling Italian front during the Greco-Italian War. On 15 December 1940 the division entered combat and until 18 March 1941, when the division was taken out of the front in preparation for the Invasion of Yugoslavia, the division was in constant combat with Greek Army units. On 10 April 1941, the division crossed into Macedonia and advanced to Debar. After the war's conclusion the division returned in May 1941 to Italy . For its conduct and service on the Greek front and during the invasion of Yugoslavia the 2nd Alpini Regiment was awarded a Silver Medal of Military Valor, which was affixed to the regiment's flag and added to the regiment's coat of arms.

In November 1941, the regiment formed the XIII Replacements Battalion, which was assigned to the 7th Alpini Valley Group, which fought Yugoslav partisans in Croatia. On 15 February 1942, the regiment formed a support weapons company for each of its three battalions. These companies were equipped with Breda M37 machine guns, and 45mm Mod. 35 and 81mm Mod. 35 mortars. The 104th Support Weapons Company was assigned to the Alpini Battalion "Borgo San Dalmazzo", the 105th Support Weapons Company to the Alpini Battalion "Dronero", and the 106th Support Weapons Company to the Alpini Battalion "Saluzzo".

==== Eastern Front ====
On 2 March 1942, the 4th Alpine Division "Cuneense" was assigned, together with the 2nd Alpine Division "Tridentina" and 3rd Alpine Division "Julia", to the Alpine Army Corps. The corps was assigned to the Italian 8th Army, which was readied to be deployed in summer 1942 to the Eastern Front. In preparation for the deployment to the Soviet Union the 2nd Alpini Regiment's depot formed on 1 April 1942 the 14th Cannons Company, which was equipped with 47/32 mod. 35 anti-tank guns. In May 1942, the XIII Replacements Battalion was disbanded and its remaining personnel assigned to other Alpini battalions deployed in Croatia.

In June 1942, the depots of the 2nd Alpini Regiment formed the II Replacements Battalion, which consisted of the 607th, 608th, and 612th Alpini companies, and the 402nd Support Weapons Company. On 20 June 1942, the II Replacements Battalion was assigned to the newly formed 104th Alpini Marching Regiment, which was assigned to the III Marching Brigade of the 8th Marching Division. The division provided replacement troops for the 8th Army's regiments fighting on the Eastern Front.

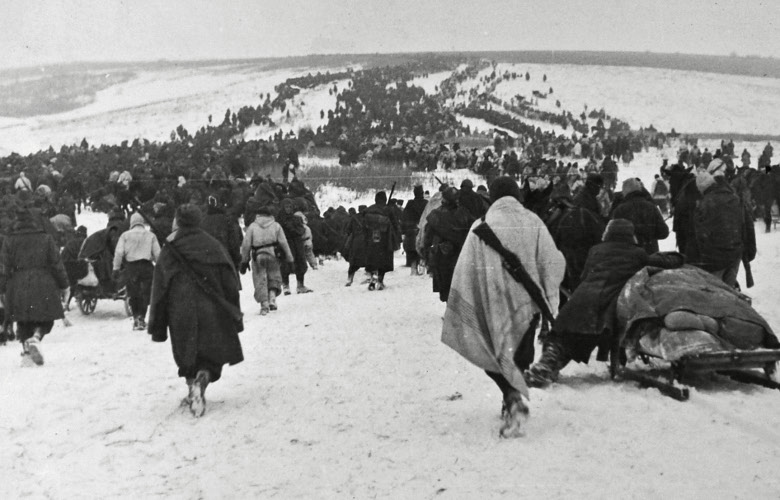
The Alpine Army Corps' retreat in Ukraine in January 1943

In July 1942 the three alpine division arrived in Eastern Ukraine, from where they marched eastwards towards the Don river. The Italian 8th Army covered the left flank of the German 6th Army, which spearheaded the German summer offensive of 1942 towards Stalingrad. On 12 December 1942, the Red Army commenced Operation Little Saturn, which, in its first stage, attacked and encircled the Italian II Army Corps and XXXV Army Corps, to the southeast of the Alpine Army Corps. On 13 January 1943, the Red Army launched the second stage of Operation Little Saturn with the Voronezh Front encircling and destroying the Hungarian Second Army to the northwest of the Alpine Army Corps.

On the evening of 17 January 1943, the Alpine Army Corps commander, General Gabriele Nasci, ordered a full retreat. At this point only the 2nd Alpine Division "Tridentina" was still capable of conducting combat operations. The 40,000-strong mass of stragglers — Alpini and Italians from other commands, plus German and Hungarians — followed the "Tridentina", which led the way westwards to the new Axis lines. As the Soviets had already occupied every village, bitter battles had to be fought to clear the way. By morning of 28 January the "Cuneense" had walked 200 km, fought 20 battles, lost 80% of its men and spent 11 nights camped out in the middle of the Russian Steppe. Temperatures during the nights were between −30 °C and −40 °C. On 28 January the last remnants of the division were overrun by Cossack forces.

On 11 February 1943, the survivors were counted and just 208 men of the regiment had reached Axis lines; none of the soldiers of the battalions "Borgo San Dalmazzo" and "Saluzzo" had made it out of the Soviet encirclement. For its bravery and sacrifice in the Soviet Union the 2nd Alpini Regiment was awarded a Gold Medal of Military Valor, which was affixed to the regiment's flag and is depicted on the regiment's coat of arms.

In January 1943, the regiment's depots in Italy reformed the Alpini Battalion "Bicocca", which was assigned to the 175th Coastal Alpini Regiment. In April 1943, the regiment was sent to the occupied French island of Corsica.

The 2nd Alpini Regiment was still in the process of being rebuilt, when the Armistice of Cassibile was announced on 8 September 1943. Two days later, on 10 September 1943, the regiment was disbanded by invading German forces. After the announcement of the armistice the Alpini Battalion "Bicocca" fought against German forces retreating through Corsica. Afterwards the battalion, along with the rest of the 175th Coastal Alpini Regiment, was transferred to Sardinia, where the battalion "Bicocca" was disbanded on 31 August 1944.

=== Cold War ===
On 23 November 1945, an Alpini regiment was formed in Turin, which was initially designated 1st Alpini Regiment as it was formed within the area overseen by the I Territorial Military Command. The regiment consisted of the I, II, and III Alpini battalions, which had been formed by renaming the 530th, 526th, and 515th guard battalions of the Italian Co-belligerent Army. On 1 January 1946, the I Alpini Battalion was renamed Alpini Battalion "Saluzzo", while the II Alpini Battalion was renamed Alpini Battalion "Susa". On 1 February 1946, the Alpini Battalion "Saluzzo" was transferred to the Special Infantry Regiment "Legnano", which in turn ceded the Alpini Battalion "Piemonte" to the 1st Alpini Regiment. On the same date, 1 February 1946, the Alpini Battalion "Piemonte" was renamed Alpini Battalion "Aosta", while the regiment's III Alpini Battalion was renamed Alpini Battalion "Saluzzo". On 15 April 1946, the regiment was renumbered as 4th Alpini Regiment.

On 15 April 1952, the 4th Alpini Regiment joined the newly formed Alpine Brigade "Taurinense". On 1 January 1953, the regiment began the process of reforming the Alpini Battalion "Mondovì". The 4th Alpini Regiment now consisted of the Alpini Battalion "Mondovì", which was one of the traditional battalions of the 1st Alpini Regiment, the Alpini Battalion "Aosta", which was one of the traditional battalions of the 4th Alpini Regiment, the Alpini Battalion "Saluzzo", which was one of the traditional battalions of the 2nd Alpini Regiment, the Alpini Battalion "Susa", which was one of the traditional battalions of the 3rd Alpini Regiment, and the 4th Mortar Company.

On 16 June 1963, the 12th Recruits Training Center, which consisted of the Recruits Training Battalion "Cadore" and Recruits Training Battalion "Orobica", moved from Montorio Veronese to Cuneo. On 1 July of the same year, the 12th Recruits Training Center was renamed 2nd Alpini Regiment. The regiment consisted of the recruit training battalions "Cadore", "Orobica", "Taurinense", and "Tridentina", which trained the recruits destined for the alpine brigades "Cadore", "Orobica", "Taurinense", and "Tridentina".

On 30 September 1972, the Recruits Training Battalion "Cadore" was disbanded, followed on 30 June 1974 by the Recruits Training Battalion "Tridentina". On 1 July 1974, the remaining two recruit training battalions "Orobica" and "Taurinense" were redesignated as I Battalion and II Battalion. On 3 October 1974, the II Battalion was disbanded and on 4 October the I Battalion became an autonomous unit and was renamed I Alpine Troops Recruits Training Battalion. On 31 October 1974, the 2nd Alpini Regiment was disbanded and the regiment's flag transferred to the Shrine of the Flags in the Vittoriano in Rome. On 1 November 1974, the I Alpine Troops Recruits Training Battalion was renamed Training Battalion "Cuneense", which on 1 October 1975 was renamed Alpini Battalion "Mondovì".

During the 1975 army reform the army disbanded the regimental level and newly independent battalions were granted for the first time their own flags. On 10 October 1975, the 4th Alpini Regiment was disbanded and the next day the regiment's two Alpini battalions "Saluzzo" and "Susa" became autonomous units and were assigned to the Alpine Brigade "Taurinense". The "Saluzzo" battalion was based in Borgo San Dalmazzo and consisted of a command, a command and services company, three Alpini companies, and a heavy mortar company with eight 120mm Mod. 63 mortars. The battalion fielded now 950 men (45 officers, 96 non-commissioned officers, and 809 soldiers).

On 12 November 1976 the President of the Italian Republic Giovanni Leone assigned with decree 846 the flag and traditions of the 2nd Alpini Regiment to the Alpini Battalion "Saluzzo".

=== Recent times ===
On 28 August 1992, the Alpini Battalion "Saluzzo" lost its autonomy and the next day the battalion entered the reformed 2nd Alpini Regiment. In 1992, the "Taurinense" brigade's Anti-Tank Company was disbanded and its personnel, with their TOW anti-tank guided missiles, assigned to the mortar companies of the 2nd Alpini Regiment and of the Alpini Battalion "Susa". Consequently the "Saluzzo" battalion's 106th Mortar Company was renamed 106th Support Weapons Company. In November 1994 the regiment was sent to the Province of Asti, which had been inundated by severe floods. For its work in Asti the Italian Red Cross awarded the 2nd Alpini Regiment a Bronze Medal of Merit, which was affixed to the regiment's flag.

In 2001 the 106th Support Weapons Company was split into the 106th Mortar Company and the 217th Anti-tank Company "Val Maira". In 2011, the 217th Anti-tank Company "Val Maira" was disbanded and its personnel integrated into the 106th Mortar Company, which was renamed 106th Maneuver Support Company.

== Organization ==
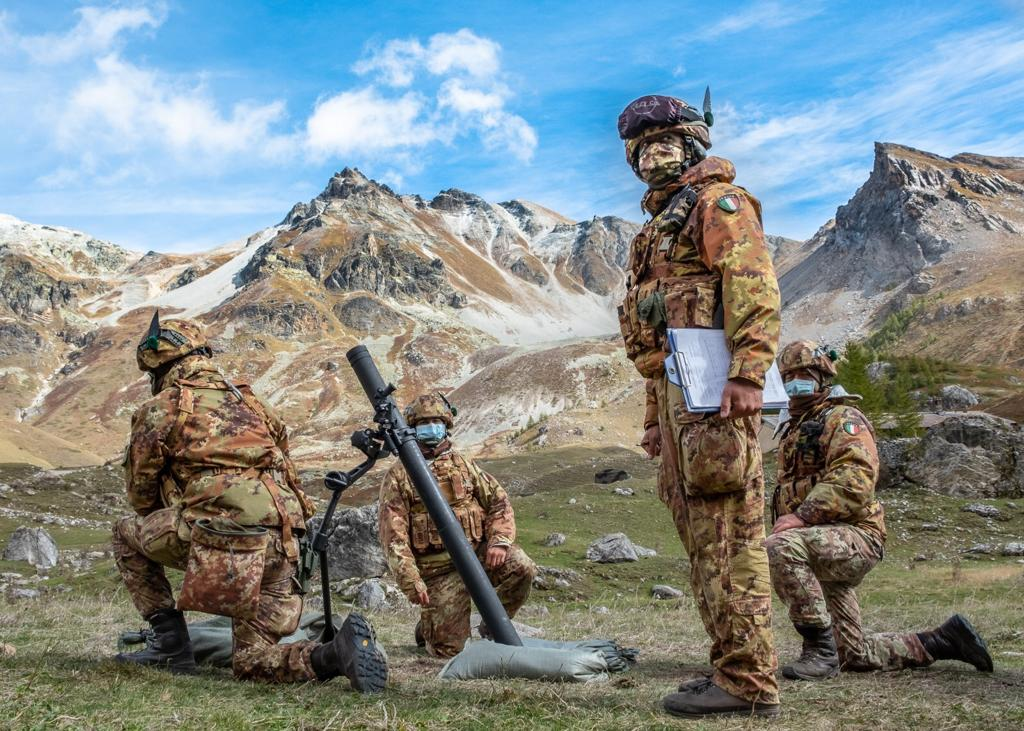
"Saluzzo" battalion troops with an 81mm mortar

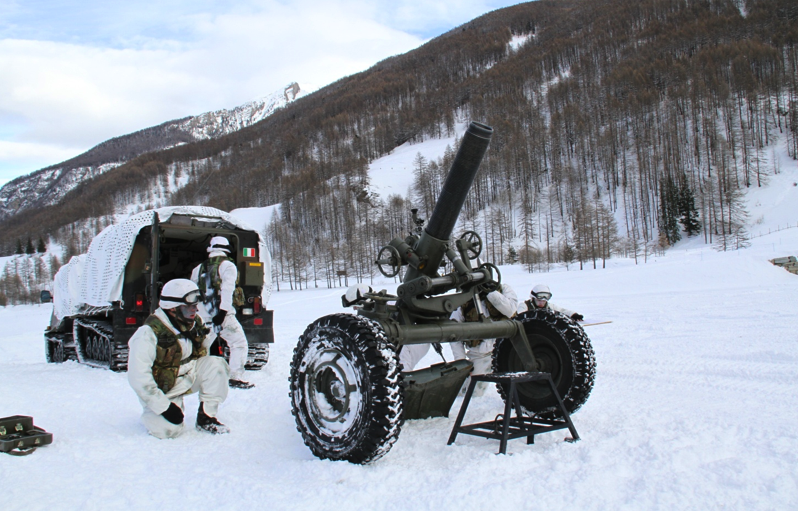
106th Mortar Company with a 120 mm mortar

As of 2024 the 2nd Alpini Regiment is organized as follows:

- 2nd Alpini Regiment, in Cuneo
  - Command and Logistic Support Company
  - Alpini Battalion "Saluzzo"
    - 21st Alpini Company
    - 22nd Alpini Company
    - 23rd Alpini Company
    - 106th Maneuver Support Company

The Alpini companies are equipped with Bv 206S tracked all-terrain carriers and Lince light multirole vehicles. The maneuver support company is equipped with 120 mm mortars and Spike MR anti-tank guided missiles.

== See also ==
- Alpine Brigade "Taurinense"
