= 8 Squadron =

8 Squadron or 8th Squadron may refer to:

- No. 8 Squadron PAF, a unit of the Pakistan Air Force
- No. 8 Squadron RAF, a unit of the Royal Air Force
- No. 8 Squadron RAAF, a unit of the Royal Australian Air Force
- No. 8 Squadron RNZAF, a unit of the Royal New Zealand Air Force
- 8 Squadron SAAF, a unit of the South African Air Force, disbanded in 2001
- 8th Tactical Fighter Squadron (JASDF), a unit of the Japan Air Self-Defense Force
- 8th Fighter Squadron, a unit of the United States Air Force
- 8th Flying Training Squadron, a unit of the United States Air Force
- 8th Special Operations Squadron, a unit of the United States Air Force
- 8th Weapons Squadron, a unit of the United States Air Force
- 8th Airlift Squadron, a unit of the United States Air Force
- HSC-8 (Helicopter Sea Combat Squadron 8), a unit of the United States Navy
- HS-8 (Helicopter Antisubmarine Squadron 8), a unit of the United States Navy
- HT-8 (Helicopter Training Squadron 8), a unit of the United States Navy
- VT-8 (Torpedo Squadron 8), a unit of the United States Navy
