= 8th Marching Division =

- Active: 1 July 1942 – 31 May 1943
- Country: Kingdom of Italy
- Branch: Royal Italian Army
- Type: Infantry
- Size: Division
- Garrison/HQ: Bolzano
- Engagements: World War II

The 8th Marching Division (Italian: 8ª Divisione di marcia) was a short-lived division of the Royal Italian Army during World War II. In the Italian military the term "Marching" refers to temporary units based in Italy to manage replacements for the operational units at the front.

== History ==
In summer 1942 Italy sent the Italian Expeditionary Corps in Russia (CSIR) with three divisions to the Eastern Front and the corps' replacements were managed by the Complementary Troops Command of the Italian Expeditionary Corps in Russia (Italian: Comando Truppe Complementi del Corpo di Spedizione Italiano in Russia). In summer 1942 Benito Mussolini decided to increase the Italian participation in the Eastern Front and ordered that the CSIR be expanded to a field army with ten divisions. Subsequently, the 8th Marching Division was formed in Bolzano on 1 July 1942 to manage replacements for the Italian Army in Russia (ARMIR).

=== Organization ===
The 8th Marching Division was made up of three brigades and eleven marching regiments. The list below provides the names of the marching regiments and the ARMIR units they provided replacements for.

- 8th Marching Division, initially in Bolzano, then in Verona
  - Headquarters
    - Command Company
    - 107th Carabinieri Section
    - 124th Field Post Office
  - 41st Supply Section
  - 1123rd Transport Section
  - I Marching Brigade, in Milan (for the XXXV Army Corps)
    - 8th Marching Regiment (Corps units)
      - CCIX Mortar Replacements Battalion
      - CCLII Mortar Replacements Battalion
      - CVI Anti-tank Replacements Battalion
    - 9th Marching Regiment (for the 9th Infantry Division "Pasubio")
      - LXXIX Fusilier Replacements Battalion (for the 79th Infantry Regiment "Pasubio")
      - LXXX Fusilier Replacements Battalion (for the 80th Infantry Regiment "Pasubio")
      - LXXXIII Fusilier Replacements Battalion (activated 10 November 1942)
      - CLVI Fusilier Replacements Battalion (for the 156th Infantry Division "Vicenza"; activated 10 November 1942)
    - 30th Marching Regiment (for the 3rd Cavalry Division "Principe Amedeo Duca d'Aosta")
      - III Bersaglieri Replacements Battalion (for the 3rd Bersaglieri Regiment)
      - VI Bersaglieri Replacements Battalion (for the 6th Bersaglieri Regiment)
      - VI Bersaglieri Motorcyclist Replacements Battalion
      - VII Bersaglieri Anti-tank Replacements Battalion
    - 52nd Marching Regiment (for the 52nd Infantry Division "Torino")
      - LXXXI Fusilier Replacements Battalion (for the 81st Infantry Regiment "Torino")
      - LXXXII Fusilier Replacements Battalion (for the 82nd Infantry Regiment "Torino")
  - II Marching Brigade, in Bologna (for the II Army Corps)
    - 2nd Marching Regiment (for the 2nd Infantry Division "Sforzesca")
      - LIII Fusilier Replacements Battalion (for the 53rd Infantry Regiment "Sforzesca")
      - LIV Fusilier Replacements Battalion (for the 54th Infantry Regiment "Sforzesca")
      - LXXXIV Fusilier Replacements Battalion (activated 10 November 1942)
    - 3rd Marching Regiment (for the 3rd Infantry Division "Ravenna"
      - XXXVII Fusilier Replacements Battalion (for the 37th Infantry Regiment "Ravenna")
      - XXXVIII Fusilier Replacements Battalion (for the 38th Infantry Regiment "Ravenna")
      - LXXXV Fusilier Replacements Battalion (activated 10 November 1942)
    - 5th Marching Regiment (for the 5th Infantry Division "Cosseria")
      - LXXXIX Fusilier Replacements Battalion (for the 89th Infantry Regiment "Cosseria")
      - XC Fusilier Replacements Battalion (for the 90th Infantry Regiment "Cosseria")
    - 7th Marching Regiment (Corps units)
      - CC Mortar Replacements Battalion
      - CCIII Mortar Replacements Battalion
      - CCV Anti-tank Replacements Battalion
  - III Marching Brigade, initially Bergamo, then in Udine (for the Alpine Army Corps)
    - 102nd Alpini Marching Regiment (for the 2nd Alpine Division "Tridentina")
      - V Alpini Replacements Battalion (for the 5th Alpini Regiment)
      - VI Alpini Replacements Battalion (for the 6th Alpini Regiment)
    - 103rd Alpini Marching Regiment (for the 3rd Alpine Division "Julia")
      - VIII Alpini Replacements Battalion (for the 8th Alpini Regiment)
      - IX Alpini Replacements Battalion (for the 9th Alpini Regiment)
    - 104th Alpini Marching Regiment (for the 4th Alpine Division "Cuneense")
      - I Alpini Replacements Battalion (for the 1st Alpini Regiment)
      - II Alpini Replacements Battalion (for the 2nd Alpini Regiment)

=== Operation Little Saturn ===
Between 12 December 1942 and 18 February 1943 the Italian Army in Russia was destroyed during the Soviet Operation Little Saturn. What little remained of the Italian divisions was repatriated in March and April 1943. As a result, the 8th Marching Division and its units were either disbanded or reassigned.

- I Brigade: The 52nd Marching Regiment was disbanded in April 1943, while the brigade command was reorganized as XXVIII Coastal Brigade and sent to Dalmatia. The 8th Marching Regiment became the 183rd Coastal Infantry Regiment and remained with the brigade, while the 9th Marching Regiment was transferred to Albania to manage replacements for Italian units there. On 30 June 1943 the 30th Marching Regiment was disbanded and its personnel used to fill the ranks of the 6th Motorized Bersaglieri Regiment.
- II Brigade: The brigade command was reorganized as XXIX Coastal Brigade and sent to Palermo in Sicily with two of its regiments, while its remaining units were disbanded.
- III Brigade: In April 1943 the brigade was assigned to the XXIII Army Corps for anti-partisan duties in the area of Tolmin and Cerkno on the Italian-Yugoslav border. The 102nd Regiment and the 104th Regiment were disbanded on 1 May 1943 and used to begin the process of reforming the 2nd Alpine Division "Tridentina", respectively the 4th Alpine Division "Cuneense". On 31 August 1943 the brigade and the 103rd Regiment were disbanded and the remaining personnel assigned to the three reforming alpine divisions.

== 230th Coastal Division ==
The 8th Marching Division was disbanded on 20 May 1943 and on 1 June 1943 the command of the 230th Coastal Division was formed with the 8th Marching Division's personnel.

=== Commanding officers ===
The division's commanding officer was:

- Generale di Divisione Egisto Conti (1 July 1942 - 20 May 1943)

The II Marching Brigade commanding officer was:

- Generale di Brigata Arturo Benigni (20 June 1942 - 22 October 1942)

== Bibliography ==
- George F. Nafziger, Italian Order of Battle. An organizational history of the Italian Army in World War II, 3 voll.
