= 8th Landwehr Division =

8th Landwehr Division (8. Landwehr-Division)
- Active: 1915-1919
- Country: Baden/Germany
- Branch: Army
- Type: Infantry
- Engagements: World War I

The 8th Landwehr Division (8. Landwehr-Division) was a unit of the Prussian/German Army. The division was formed on January 31, 1915, out of the formerly independent 56th Landwehr Infantry Brigade, which had been dissolved on January 25, 1915. The division spent the period from its formation to early 1917 mainly involved in positional warfare in Upper Alsace, after which it occupied the trenchlines near Verdun. It remained in positional warfare in this general region until the end of the war. It participated in no major battles, but was primarily suited to quieter sectors of the line. Allied intelligence rated the division as a fourth class division, though it noted that "in the attack it did fairly well, without heavy loss." The division was disbanded in 1919 during the demobilization of the German Army after World War I.

The 8th Landwehr Division, like the 56th Landwehr Infantry Brigade before it, was raised in the Grand Duchy of Baden. As a Landwehr division, it was primarily composed of older soldiers who had already fulfilled their regular and reserve service obligations.

== Commanding officers ==
The commanding officers of the 8th Landwehr Division were:

- Generalleutnant Albert von Bodungen (January 25, 1915 - January 5, 1917)
- Generalleutnant Otto Hans Eduard Schumann (January 6, 1917 - December 15, 1918)

== Order of battle on March 12, 1915 ==
The order of battle of the division on March 12, 1915, shortly after its formation, was as follows:

- Badisches Landwehr-Infanterie-Regiment Nr. 109
- Badisches Landwehr-Infanterie-Regiment Nr. 110
- Feld-Maschinengewehr-Zug Nr. 27
- Feld-Maschinengewehr-Zug Nr. 29
- Festungs-Maschinengewehr-Trupp/Festung Istein
- Festungs-Maschinengewehr-Trupp/Festung Hüningen
- 2. Landwehr-Eskadron/XIV. Armeekorps
- 3. Landwehr-Eskadron/XIV. Armeekorps
- Ersatz-Abteilung/2. Unter-Elsässisches Feldartillerie-Regiment Nr. 67
- Landwehr-Fußartillerie-Bataillon Nr. 13
- Ersatz-Bataillon/Lauenburgisches Fußartillerie-Regiment Nr. 20
- 2.Reserve-Kompanie/Badisches Pionier-Bataillon Nr. 14
- Lichtsignal-Abteilung Nr. 2/Festung Istein
- Festungs-Luftschiff-Trupp Nr. 13
- Fernsprech-Trupp Nr. 4
- Minenwerfer-Trupp Nr. 4

== Order of battle on January 4, 1918 ==
Divisions underwent many changes during the war, with regiments moving from division to division, and some being destroyed and rebuilt. The 8th Landwehr Division, originally not much bigger than a reinforced brigade, received a third infantry regiment and was reorganized as a standard German infantry division. An artillery command and a divisional signals command were created. The 8th Landwehr Division's order of battle on January 4, 1918, was as follows:

- 56. Landwehr-Infanterie-Brigade
  - Badisches Landwehr-Infanterie-Regiment Nr. 109
  - Badisches Landwehr-Infanterie-Regiment Nr. 110
  - Badisches Landwehr-Infanterie-Regiment Nr. 111
- 1. Eskadron/Jäger-Regiment zu Pferde Nr. 5
- Artillerie-Kommandeur 147 (from June 6, 1917)
  - Landwehr-Feldartillerie-Regiment Nr. 8 (from August 7, 1915)
- Stab Pionier-Bataillon Nr. 408
  - 1.Reserve-Kompanie/Badisches Pionier-Bataillon Nr. 14
  - 2.Reserve-Kompanie/Badisches Pionier-Bataillon Nr. 14
  - Minenwerfer-Kompanie Nr. 308
- Divisions-Nachrichten-Kommandeur 508 (from September 12, 1917)
