= 8th Missouri Infantry Regiment =

The 8th Missouri Infantry Regiment may refer to:

- 8th Missouri Infantry Regiment (Union), a Union regiment during the American Civil War
- 8th Missouri Infantry Regiment (Confederate), a Confederate regiment during the American Civil War
- 11th Missouri Infantry Regiment (Confederate), a Confederate regiment previously designated the 8th Missouri Infantry Regiment

== See also ==
- 8th Missouri Cavalry Regiment
