= 1st Alpini Regiment =

Active Italian Army mountain infantry unit

- 1° Reggimento Alpini
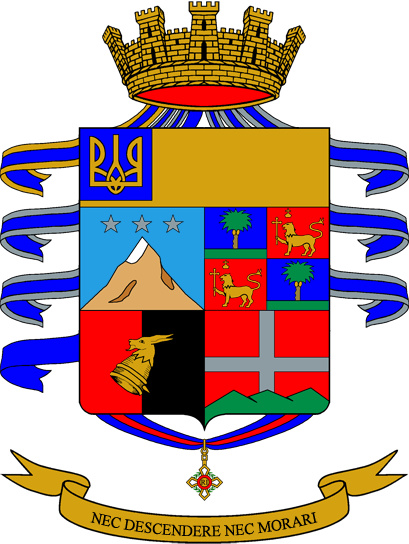
- Regimental coat of arms
- Active: 1 Nov. 1882 – 10 Sept. 1943; 23 Nov. 1945 – 15 April 1946; 1 Oct. 1975 – 31 Aug. 1997; 1 Oct. 2022 – today
- Country: Italy
- Branch: Italian Army
- Type: Mountain Infantry
- Part of: Alpine Brigade "Taurinense"
- Garrison/HQ: Turin
- Motto: "Nec descendere nec morari"
- Anniversaries: 16 June 1917
- Decorations: 1× Military Order of Italy; 1× Gold Medal of Military Valor; 5× Silver Medals of Military Valor; 1× Bronze Medal of Military Valor

Insignia
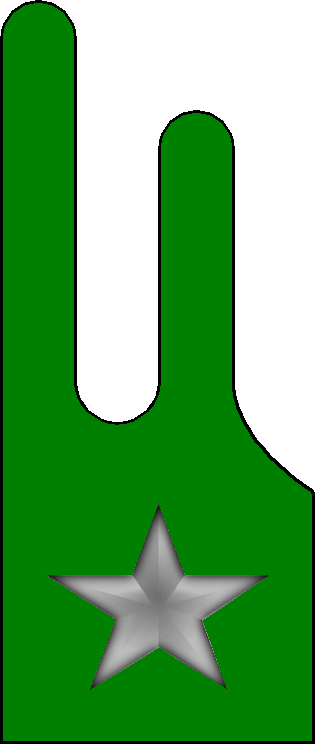
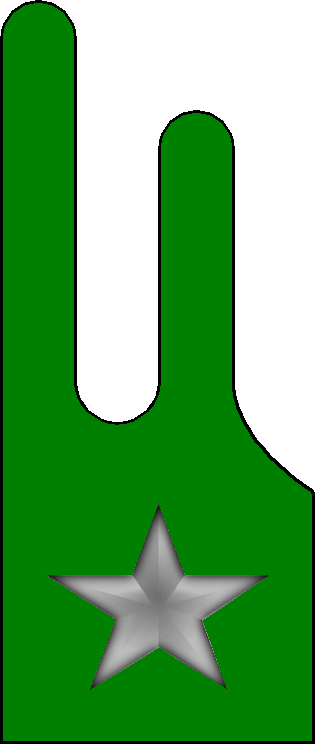
- Alpini gorget patches

The 1st Alpini Regiment (Italian: 1° Reggimento Alpini) in a mountain warfare unit of the Italian Army based in Turin in Piedmont. The regiment belongs to the Italian Army's Alpini infantry speciality and was last active as Alpini Battalion Mondovì. On 1 October 2022, the flag and traditions of the 1st Alpini Regiment were assigned to the Command and Tactical Supports Unit "Taurinense" of the Alpine Brigade "Taurinense", which on the same day was renamed 1st Alpini Command and Tactical Supports Unit. On 1 November 1882, the Royal Italian Army formed the 1st Alpini Regiment, which had its recruiting area in the Ligurian Alps and Maritime Alps. During World War I the regiment expanded to nine battalions, which fought separately in the alpine areas of the Italian front.

In 1935 the regiment was assigned to the 4th Alpine Division "Cuneense", with which it served during World War II in the invasion of France and the Greco-Italian War. In summer 1942 the division was transferred to the Eastern Front in the Soviet Union, where it was destroyed in winter 1942–43 during the Soviet Operation Little Saturn. The remnants of the division were repatriated in spring 1943. For its service and sacrifice on the Eastern Front the 1st Alpini Regiment was awarded Italy's highest military honor the Gold Medal of Military Valor. On 8 September 1943, the Armistice of Cassibile was announced and two days later, on 10 September 1943, invading German forces disbanded the 1st Alpini Regiment.

In 1950, the 4th Alpini Regiment formed a recruits training battalion in Bra, which was designated Battalion "Mondovì". In 1953, the Alpini Battalion "Mondovì" was reformed as an operational unit. In 1962, the Alpini Battalion "Mondovì" moved to Paluzza in Friuli-Venezia Giulia and was assigned to the 8th Alpini Regiment. In 1975, the battalion in Paluzza was disbanded and on 1 October of the same year, the Recruits Training Battalion "Cuneense" in Cuneo was renamed Alpini Battalion "Mondovì". The battalion was assigned to the Alpine Brigade "Taurinense" and trained the brigade's recruits. In 1976 the battalion was assigned the flag and traditions of the 1st Alpini Regiment. In 1997, the Alpini Battalion "Mondovì" was disbanded. On 1 October 2022, the flag and traditions of the 1st Alpini Regiment were assigned to the Command and Tactical Supports Unit "Taurinense" of the Alpine Brigade "Taurinense". The regiment's anniversary falls on 16 June 1917, the height of the Battle of Mount Ortigara, during which the regiment's battalions earned three Silver Medals of Military Valor.

== History ==
On 15 October 1872, the Royal Italian Army formed 15 locally recruited Alpini companies in the alpine regions of Northern Italy. Nine more companies were formed the following year. In 1875 the 24 companies were organized into seven battalions, and in 1878 the companies were increased to 36 and the battalions to ten. On 1 November 1882, the Alpini companies were increased to 72 and grouped into 20 battalions. On the same date the battalions were assigned to six newly formed Alpini regiments, which were numbered 1st to 6th from West to East, while companies were numbered from 1 to 72 from to West to East. Upon entering the regiments, the battalions, which until then had been designated by a Roman numeral, were named for their recruiting zone, while the Alpini companies were renumbered sequentially from 1st to 72nd. One of the six Alpini regiments formed on 1 November 1882 was the 1st Alpini Regiment, which was formed in Mondovì in Southern Piedmont. The new regiment received the battalions "Alto Tanaro" and "Val Tanaro", which recruited in the Tanaro Valley, as well as the Battalion "Val Camonica", which recruited in the Camonica Valley in Lombardy.

- 1st Alpini Regiment, in Mondovì
  - Battalion "Alto Tanaro", in Pieve di Teco
    - 1st, 2nd and 3rd Company
  - Battalion "Val Tanaro", in Ceva
    - 4th, 5th, 6th, and 7th Company
  - Battalion "Val Camonica", in Breno
    - 52nd, 53rd, 54th, and 55th Company

On 1 April 1885, the regiment transferred the Battalion "Val Camonica" to the 5th Alpini Regiment and in turn received from the 2nd Alpini Regiment the Battalion "Val Pesio", which recruited along the Pesio river in Southern Piedmont. During the same year the regiment also ceded the 7th Company of the Battalion "Val Tanaro" to the 4th Alpini Regiment. The 7th Company moved to Domodossola, where it joined the Battalion "Val d'Aosta". On 1 November 1886, the battalions changed their names from their recruiting zones to the cities and towns, where their base was located. At the same time Alpini soldiers and non-commissioned officers were issued thread tufts, called Nappina in Italian, which were clipped to the Cappello Alpino headdress, and colored white for the troops of a regiment's first battalion, red for the troops of a regiment's second battalion, green for the troops of a regiment's third battalion, and blue for the troops of a regiment's fourth battalion. The 1st Alpini Regiment consisted afterwards of the following units:

- 1st Alpini Regiment, in Mondovì
  - Alpini Battalion "Ceva", in Ceva (former Battalion "Val Tanaro")
    - 1st, 4th, 5th, and 6th Alpini Company
  - Alpini Battalion "Pieve di Teco", in Pieve di Teco (former Battalion "Alto Tanaro")
    - 2nd, 3rd, and 8th Alpini Company
  - Alpini Battalion "Mondovì", in Mondovì (former Battalion "Val Pesio")
    - 9th, 10th, and 11th Alpini Company

In 1895–96 the regiment provided 20 officers and 527 troops to help form the I and II provisional Alpini battalions, which were deployed to Eritrea for the First Italo-Ethiopian War. In 1901 the regiment was assigned together with the 2nd Alpini Regiment to the I Alpini Group, which on 9 August 1910 was renamed I Alpine Brigade. In January 1908, the regiment transferred the 6th Alpini Company of the Alpini Battalion "Ceva" to 7th Alpini Regiment to help form the Alpini Battalion "Tolmezzo". In 1911, the Alpini Battalion "Mondovì" was deployed to Libya for the Italo-Turkish War. The battalion distinguished itself during the occupation of El-Mergèb and in the Battle of Misrata, and was awarded a Bronze Medal of Military Valor, which was affixed to the flag of the 1st Alpini Regiment and added to the regiment's coat of arms. During the war the 1st Alpini Regiment also provided 136 troops to augment other units fighting in the war.

=== World War I ===
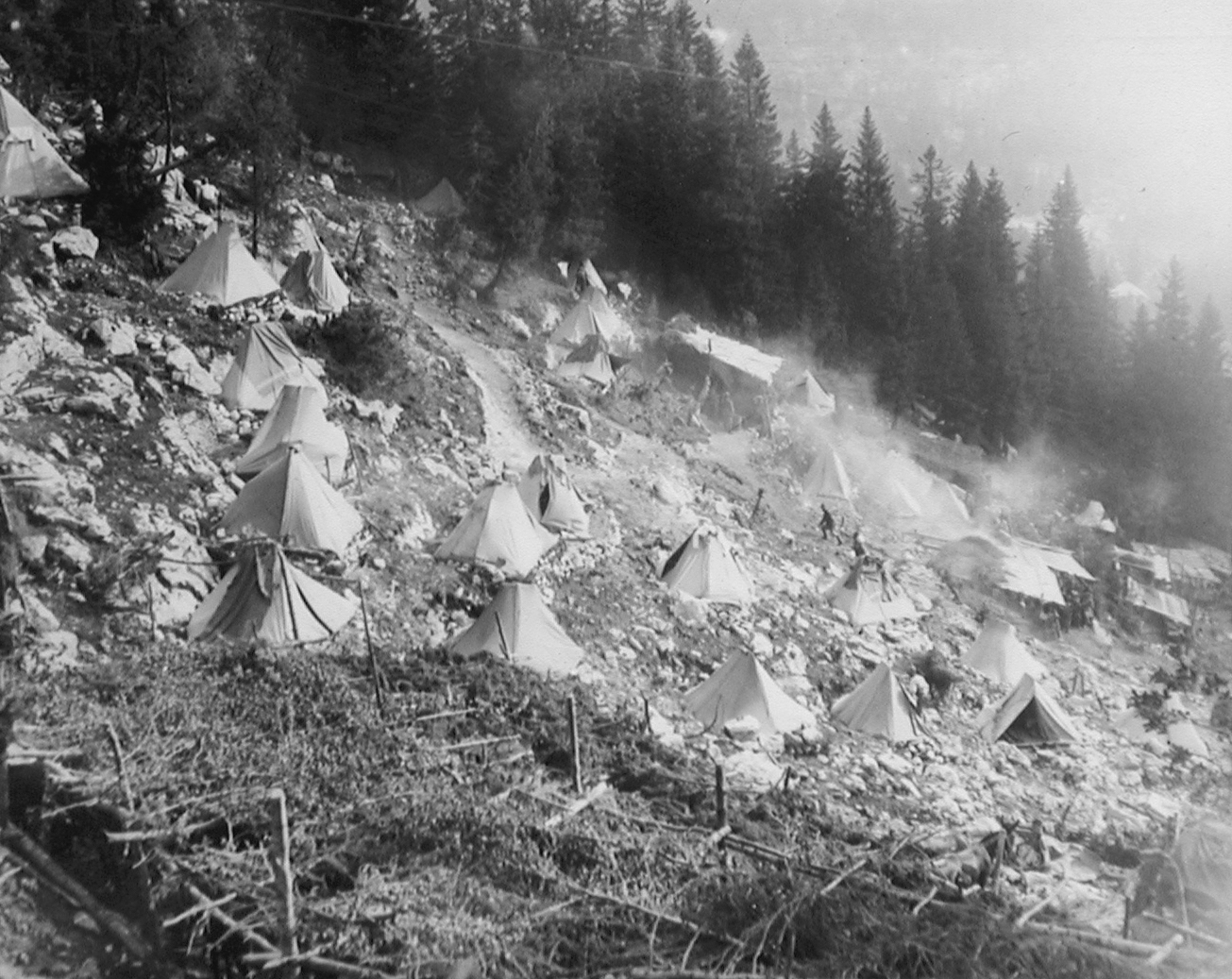
1st Alpini Regiment camp below the Sella Nevea pass during World War I

At the outbreak of World War I the Alpini speciality consisted of eight regiments, which fielded 26 battalions with 79 companies. Each Alpini battalion, with the exception of the Alpini Battalion "Verona", fielded three Alpini companies, while the Alpini Battalion "Verona" fielded four companies. Each company consisted of one captain, four lieutenants and 250 other ranks. After Italy's initial declaration of neutrality 38 additional Alpini companies were formed in fall of 1914 with men, who had completed their military service in the preceding four years. These companies were numbered from 80th to 117th and assigned to the existing battalions. In January 1915, each Alpini battalion formed a reserve battalion, with men, who had completed their military service at least four years, but not more than eleven years earlier. These reserve battalions were named for a valley (Italian: Valle; abbreviated Val) located near their associated regular Alpini battalion's base, and the reserve battalions received the same Nappina as their associated regular Alpini battalion. The companies of the Valle battalions were numbered from 201st to 281st, with the numbers 227th, 233rd, 237th, 271st, and 273rd unused.

On 23 May 1915, Italy declared war on Austria-Hungary and at the time the 1st Alpini Regiment consisted of the following units:

- 1st Alpini Regiment, in Mondovì
  - Alpini Battalion "Ceva"
    - 1st, 4th, 5th, 98th, and 116th Alpini Company
  - Alpini Battalion "Pieve di Teco"
    - 2nd, 3rd, 8th, 107th, and 115th Alpini Company
  - Alpini Battalion "Mondovì"
    - 9th, 10th, 11th, and 114th Alpini Company (2nd Alpini Company, originally assigned to the Alpini Battalion "Pieve di Teco", joined the battalion in 1916)
  - Alpini Battalion "Val Tanaro"
    - 201st, 204th, and 205th Alpini Company
  - Alpini Battalion "Val Arroscia"
    - 202nd, 203rd, and 208th Alpini Company
  - Alpini Battalion "Val Ellero"
    - 209th, 210th, and 211th Alpini Company

By the end of 1915 the Alpini regiments began to form additional companies with recruits born in 1896. These new companies were numbered from 118th to 157th and were used, together with the 38 companies formed earlier, to form an additional reserve battalion for each regular battalion. These new battalions were named for a mountain (Italian: Monte) located near their associated regular Alpini battalion's base, and the reserve battalions received the same Nappina as their associated regular Alpini battalion. The 1st Alpini Regiment thus added the following Monte battalions:

- Alpini Battalion "Monte Mercantour"
  - 98th, 116th, and 121st Alpini Company
- Alpini Battalion "Monte Saccarello"
  - 107th, 115th, and 120th Alpini Company
- Alpini Battalion "Monte Clapier"
  - 114th, 118th, and 119th Alpini Company

As the mountainous terrain of the Italian front made the deployment of entire Alpini regiments impracticable, the regimental commands of the eight Alpini regiments were disbanded in March 1916. Likewise in April 1916 the pre-war alpine brigade commands were disbanded, and the personnel of the regimental commands and alpine brigade commands used to from twenty regiment-sized group commands and nine brigade-sized grouping commands. Afterwards Alpini battalions were employed either independently or assigned to groups, groupings, or infantry divisions as needed. Between 10 and 14 March 1916, the companies of the Alpini Battalion "Pieve di Teco" were disbanded and its personnel assigned to other to the Alpini battalions "Exilles", "Bassano", and "Cividale". On 16 May 1916, the battalion "Pieve di Teco" was also disbanded and its companies reformed by other Alpini regiments and assigned to other Alpini battalions: the 2nd Alpini Company was reformed and assigned to the Alpini Battalion "Mondovì", while the 3rd Alpini Company was reformed to complement the Alpini Battalion "Val Dora" of the 3rd Alpini Regiment, and the 8th Alpini Company was reformed to complement the Alpini Battalion "Val Fella" of the 8th Alpini Regiment.

In June 1917, the remaining eight battalions of the regiment were concentrated, together with 14 other Alpini battalions and four mountain artillery groups, on Mount Ortigara for the Battle of Mount Ortigara. The battle resulted in heavy Italian losses, with the battalions of the 1st Alpini Regiment suffering 574 killed, 3,265 wounded, and 873 missing. In November and December 1917, after the disastrous Battle of Caporetto, the following retreat to the Piave river, and the subsequent First Battle of the Piave River and First Battle of Monte Grappa, the Royal Italian Army disbanded twenty Alpini battalions, which had suffered heavy casualties during the battles and retreat. Among the twenty battalions were the following battalions of the 1st Alpini Regiment:

- Alpini Battalion "Monte Mercantour"; battalion annihilated during the retreat and disbanded on 18 November 1917, with the survivors assigned to the Alpini Battalion "Pinerolo" of the 3rd Alpini Regiment
- Alpini Battalion "Val Arroscia"; battalion annihilated during the retreat and disbanded on 18 November 1917, with the survivors assigned to the Alpini Battalion "Pinerolo" of the 3rd Alpini Regiment
- Alpini Battalion "Val Ellero"; battalion annihilated during the retreat and disbanded on 18 November 1917
- Alpini Battalion "Ceva"; disbanded on 30 November 1917 and the survivors used to reform the 10th Alpini Company of the Alpini Battalion "Mondovì"
- Alpini Battalion "Monte Saccarello"; battalion annihilated during the First Battle of Monte Grappa and disbanded on 9 December 1917, with the survivors grouped into the 107th Alpini Company

On 1 August 1918, the Alpini Battalion "Monte Saccarello" was reformed with the 107th Alpini Company, and the Ski units of the Alpini battalions "Exilles" (3rd Alpini Regiment) and "Monte Suello" (5th Alpini Regiment). In October–November 1918, the reformed battalion participated in the Battle of Vittorio Veneto.

During the war a total of 1,200 officers and 40,000 soldiers served in the 1st Alpini Regiment, of which 175 officers and 4,126 soldiers were killed in action, while 390 officers and 10,805 soldiers were wounded. For their service and sacrifice during the war four of the regiment's battalions were awarded a Silver Medal of Military Valor:

- the Alpini Battalion "Monte Clapier" was awarded a Silver Medal of Military Valor for its conduct on Monte Cimone during the Battle of Asiago on 23–26 May 1916, and its conduct on Mount Ortigara during the Battle of Mount Ortigara on 10–16 June 1917.
- the Alpini Battalion "Mondovì" was awarded a Silver Medal of Military Valor for its conduct during the Battle of Mount Ortigara on 10–19 June 1917.
- the Alpini battalions "Ceva" and "Monte Saccarello" were awarded a shared Silver Medal of Military Valor for their conduct during the Battle of Mount Ortigara on 10–19 June 1917; and the "Ceva" battalion's conduct on Monte Čukla on 23 August 1915 and 10–11 May 1916, and the "Monte Saccarello" battalion's conduct during the Battle of Asiago in June 1916.

The three Silver Medals of Military Valor were affixed to the 1st Alpini Regiment's flag and added to the regiment's coat of arms.

=== Interwar years ===
After the end of the war the Alpini battalions "Monte Clapier" and "Monte Saccarello" were disbanded, while on 15 March 1919, the Alpini Battalion "Val Tanaro" was renamed Alpini Battalion "Ceva". At the end of 1919 the regiment consisted only of the Alpini battalions "Ceva" and "Mondovì". On 1 January 1920, the regimental command was reformed. The reformed regiment received the Alpini battalions "Dronero" and "Saluzzo" from the 2nd Alpini Regiment and transferred its battalions "Ceva" and "Mondovì" to the 3rd Alpini Regiment, which in turn transferred its Alpini Battalion "Pinerolo" to the 1st Alpini Regiment. With the transfer of the battalions also the military awards of the battalions were transferred from regiment to regiment and affixed to the respective regimental flags. In 1921, the regiment was assigned to the 1st Alpine Division, which also included the 2nd Alpini Regiment, 3rd Alpini Regiment, and 1st Mountain Artillery Regiment. On 3 January 1923, the regiment returned the Alpini Battalion "Pinerolo" to the 3rd Alpini regiment, and on 1 February of the same year, the regiment swapped the battalions "Dronero" and "Saluzzo" for the battalions "Ceva" and "Mondovì" with the 2nd Alpini Regiment. On 31 May 1923, the regiment reformed the Alpini Battalion "Pieve di Teco". During the same year the 1st Alpine Division was replaced by the I Alpini Grouping, which in 1926 was reorganized as I Alpine Brigade. The brigade included, besides the 1st Alpini Regiment, also the 2nd Alpini Regiment, 3rd Alpini Regiment, 4th Alpini Regiment, and 1st Mountain Artillery Regiment.

On 19 October 1933, I Alpine Brigade was split and the 1st Alpini Regiment joined, together with the 4th Alpini Regiment, the newly formed IV Alpine Brigade, which was based in Cuneo. On 1 January 1934, the newly formed 4th Mountain Artillery Regiment joined the brigade, which on 27 October 1934 was renamed IV Superior Alpine Command. In December of the same year the command was given the name "Cuneense". On 31 October 1935, the IV Superior Alpine Command "Cuneense" was reorganized as 4th Alpine Division "Cuneense", which included 1st Alpini Regiment, 2nd Alpini Regiment, and 4th Alpine Artillery Regiment "Cuneense".

=== Second Italo-Ethiopian War ===
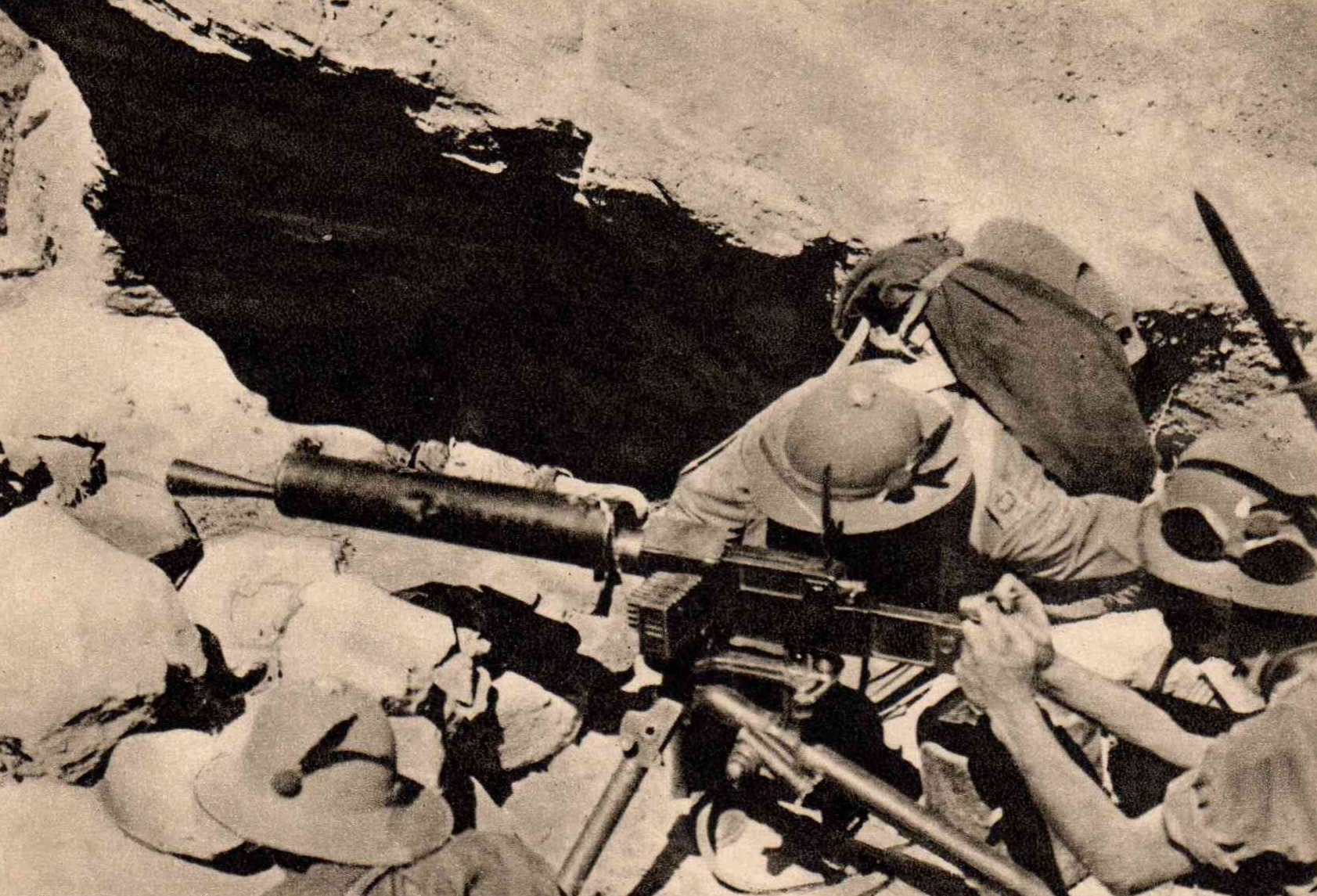
Alpini with a Fiat–Revelli Mod. 1914 machine gun during the Battle of Amba Aradam

On 22 December 1935, the 1st Alpini Regiment transferred its Alpini Battalion "Pieve di Teco" to the 7th Alpini Regiment, which on 31 December of the same year was assigned to the newly formed 5th Alpine Division "Pusteria". The new division had been formed for the Second Italo-Ethiopian War and on 6 January 1936 the "Pusteria" division's units embarked in Livorno and Naples for the transfer to Massawa in Eritrea. The same month the 1st Alpini Regiment formed the Alpini Battalion "Pieve di Teco II" as replacement for the battalion fighting in Ethiopia and the 603rd Company, which consisted of volunteers and was assigned to the VII Replacements Battalion. The VII Replacements Battalion was attached to 7th Alpini Regiment and shipped to East Africa, where in the meantime the "Pusteria" was engaged in combat against Ethiopian troops. In East Africa the Alpini Battalion "Pieve di Teco" fought in the battles of Amba Aradam, Amba Alagi, Worq Amba, and Maychew. During the latter the battalion distinguished itself at Mekan Pass and was awarded a Silver Medal of Military Valor, which was affixed to the flag of the 1st Alpini Regiment and added to the regiment's coat of arms. In April 1937, the Alpini Battalion "Pieve di Teco" returned to Italy and on 10 April the Alpini Battalion "Pieve di Teco II" was disbanded.

=== World War II ===
On 25 August 1939, shortly before the German Invasion of Poland, the Alpini battalions "Val Tanaro", "Val Arroscia", and "Val Ellero" were reformed with reservists and assigned to the 6th Alpini Group. On 10 June 1940, the day Italy entered World War II, the regiment fielded 160 officers and 5,046 other ranks for a total strength of 5,206 men. The regiment had 23 horses, 1,242 mules and 109 transport vehicles at its disposal. The regiment's organization at the time was as follows:

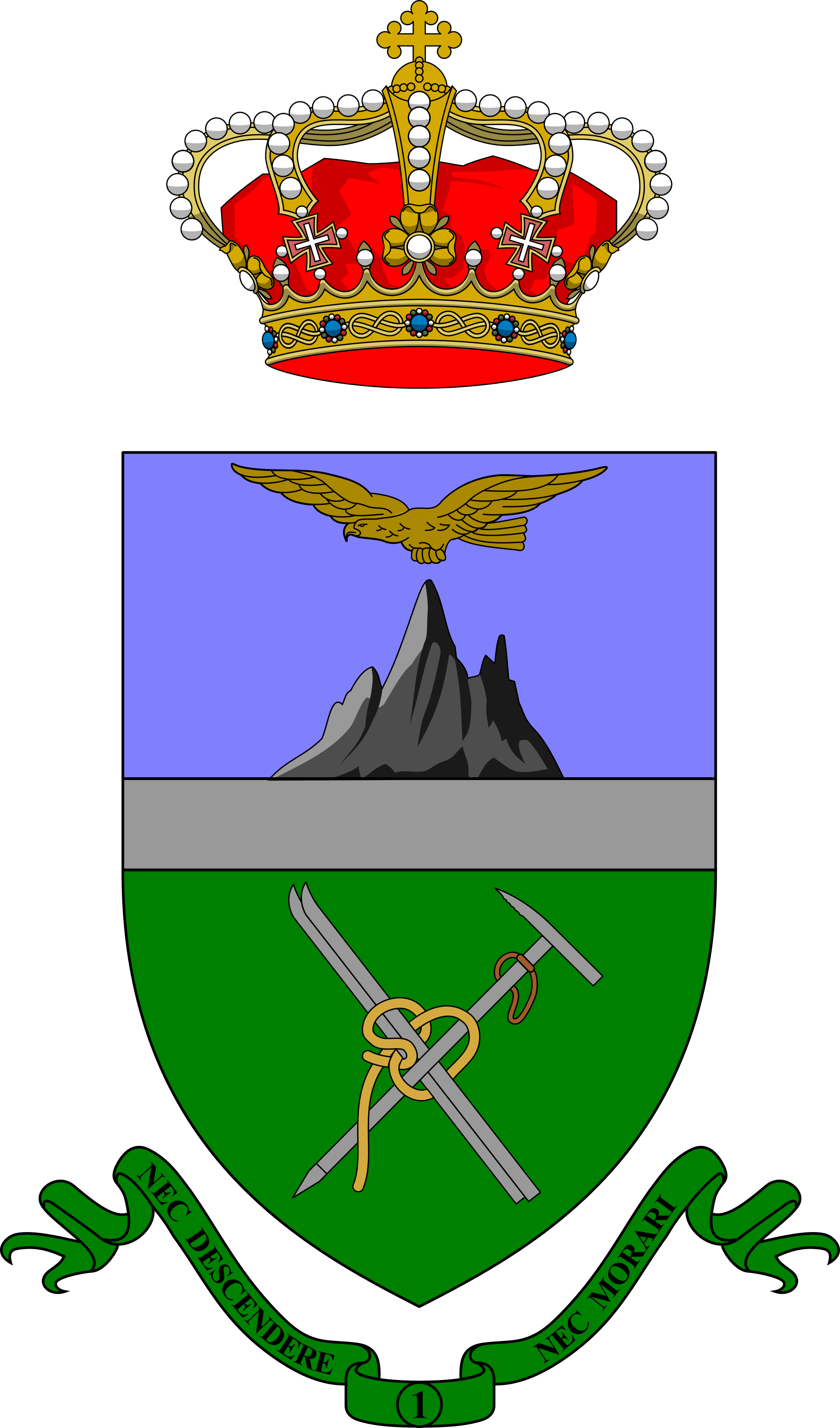
- 1st Alpini Regiment, in Mondovì
  - Regimental Command Company, in Mondovì
  - Alpini Battalion "Ceva", in Ceva
    - Command Company, in Ceva
    - 1st and 5th Alpini Company, in Ceva
    - 18th Alpini Company, in Bagnasco
  - Alpini Battalion "Pieve di Teco", in Chiusa di Pesio
    - Command Company, in Dronero
    - 2nd and 3rd Alpini Company, in Chiusa di Pesio
    - 8th Alpini Company, in Roccaforte Mondovì
  - Alpini Battalion "Mondovì", in Mondovì
    - Command Company, in Mondovì
    - 9th Alpini Company, in Torre Mondovì
    - 10th Alpini Company, in San Michele Mondovì
    - 11th Alpini Company, in Vicoforte
  - 1st Supply Section, in Beinette
  - 1st Medical Section (includes the 612th Field Hospital), in Mondovì
  - 21st Train Section, in San Bernolfo Mondovì (equipped with mules)

In June 1940 the regiment participated in the invasion of France. After the Battle of France the Alpini battalions "Val Tanaro", "Val Arroscia", and "Val Ellero" were disbanded on 31 October 1940.

==== Greco-Italian War ====
In November 1940, the 4th Alpine Division "Cuneense" was transferred to Albania to shore up the crumbling Italian front during the Greco-Italian War. On 15 December 1940 the division entered combat and until 18 March 1941, when the division was taken out of the front in preparation for the Invasion of Yugoslavia, the division was in constant combat with Greek Army units. On 10 April 1941, the division crossed into Macedonia and advanced to Debar. After the war's conclusion the division returned in May 1941 to Italy . For its conduct and service on the Greek front and during the invasion of Yugoslavia the 2nd Alpini Regiment was awarded a Silver Medal of Military Valor, which was affixed to the regiment's flag and added to the regiment's coat of arms.

In November 1941, the regiment formed two replacement battalions, with personnel meant to replace the casualties of the Alpini battalions: the I Replacements Battalion, which consisted of a command company, and the 601st, 604th, and 607th companies, was placed at the disposition of the General Staff of the Royal Italian Army, while the XII Replacements Battalion, which consisted of a command company, and the 602nd, 603rd, 673rd, and 674th companies, was assigned to the 7th Alpini Valley Group, which fought Yugoslav partisans in Croatia. On 15 February 1942, the regiment formed a support weapons company for each of its three battalions. These companies were equipped with Breda M37 machine guns, and 45mm Mod. 35 and 81mm Mod. 35 mortars. The 101st Support Weapons Company was assigned to the Alpini Battalion "Ceva", the 102nd Support Weapons Company to the Alpini Battalion "Pieve di Teco", and the 103rd Support Weapons Company to the Alpini Battalion "Mondovì".

==== Eastern Front ====
On 2 March 1942, the 4th Alpine Division "Cuneense" was assigned, together with the 2nd Alpine Division "Tridentina" and 3rd Alpine Division "Julia", to the Alpine Army Corps. The corps was assigned to the Italian 8th Army, which was readied to be deployed in summer 1942 to the Eastern Front. In preparation for the deployment to the Soviet Union the 1st Alpini Regiment's depot formed on 1 April 1942 the 84th Cannons Company, which was equipped with 47/32 mod. 35 anti-tank guns. In May 1942, the XII Replacements Battalion was disbanded and its remaining personnel assigned to other Alpini battalions deployed in Croatia.

In June 1942, the depots of the 1st Alpini Regiment formed the I Replacements Battalion, which consisted of the 601st, 602nd, and 604th Alpini companies, and the 401st Support Weapons Company. On 20 June 1942, the I Replacements Battalion was assigned to the newly formed 104th Alpini Marching Regiment, which was assigned to the III Marching Brigade of the 8th Marching Division. The division provided replacement troops for the 8th Army's regiments fighting on the Eastern Front.

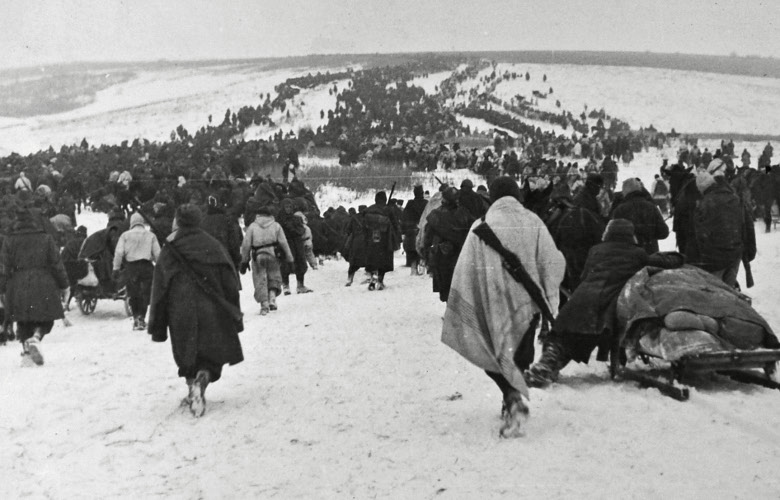
The Alpine Army Corps' retreat in Ukraine in January 1943

In July 1942 the three alpine division arrived in Eastern Ukraine, from where they marched eastwards towards the Don river. The Italian 8th Army covered the left flank of the German 6th Army, which spearheaded the German summer offensive of 1942 towards Stalingrad. On 12 December 1942, the Red Army commenced Operation Little Saturn, which, in its first stage, attacked and encircled the Italian II Army Corps and XXXV Army Corps, to the southeast of the Alpine Army Corps. On 13 January 1943, the Red Army launched the second stage of Operation Little Saturn with the Voronezh Front encircling and destroying the Hungarian Second Army to the northwest of the Alpine Army Corps.

On the evening of 17 January 1943, the Alpine Army Corps commander, General Gabriele Nasci, ordered a full retreat. At this point only the 2nd Alpine Division "Tridentina" was still capable of conducting combat operations. The 40,000-strong mass of stragglers — Alpini and Italians from other commands, plus German and Hungarians — followed the "Tridentina", which led the way westwards to the new Axis lines. As the Soviets had already occupied every village, bitter battles had to be fought to clear the way. By morning of 28 January the "Cuneense" had walked 200 km, fought 20 battles, lost 80% of its men and spent 11 nights camped out in the middle of the Russian Steppe. Temperatures during the nights were between −30 °C and −40 °C. On 28 January the last remnants of the division were overrun by Cossack forces.

On 11 February 1943, the survivors were counted and just 722 men of the regiment had reached Axis lines; none of the soldiers of the battalions "Ceva", "Pieve di Teco", and "Mondovì" had made it out of the Soviet encirclement. For its bravery and sacrifice in the Soviet Union the 1st Alpini Regiment was awarded a Gold Medal of Military Valor, which was affixed to the regiment's flag and is depicted on the regiment's coat of arms.

In January 1943, the regiment's depots in Italy reformed two Monte battalions: the Alpini Battalion "Monte Mercantour" and the Alpini Battalion "Mongioje", which inherited the traditions and companies of the Alpini Battalion "Monte Clapier". Both battalions were assigned to the 175th Coastal Alpini Regiment, which was sent in April 1943 to the occupied French island of Corsica.

The 1st Alpini Regiment was still in the process of being rebuilt, when the Armistice of Cassibile was announced on 8 September 1943. Two days later, on 10 September 1943, the regiment was disbanded by invading German forces. After the announcement of the armistice the Alpini battalions "Monte Mercantour" and "Mongioje" fought against German forces retreating through Corsica. Afterwards the battalions, along with the rest of the 175th Coastal Alpini Regiment, were transferred to Sardinia, where the battalions "Monte Mercantour" and "Mongioje" were disbanded on 31 August 1944.

=== Cold War ===
On 23 November 1945, an Alpini regiment was formed in Turin, which was initially designated 1st Alpini Regiment as it was formed within the area overseen by the I Territorial Military Command. The regiment consisted of the I, II, and III Alpini battalions, which had been formed by renaming the 530th, 526th, and 515th guard battalions of the Italian Co-belligerent Army. On 1 January 1946, the I Alpini Battalion was renamed Alpini Battalion "Saluzzo", while the II Alpini Battalion was renamed Alpini Battalion "Susa". On 1 February 1946, the Alpini Battalion "Saluzzo" was transferred to the Special Infantry Regiment "Legnano", which in turn ceded the Alpini Battalion "Piemonte" to the 1st Alpini Regiment. On the same date, 1 February 1946, the Alpini Battalion "Piemonte" was renamed Alpini Battalion "Aosta", while the regiment's III Alpini Battalion was renamed Alpini Battalion "Saluzzo". On 15 April 1946, the regiment was renumbered as 4th Alpini Regiment.

On 1 January 1950, the 4th Alpini Regiment formed a recruits training battalion in Bra, which was designated Battalion "Mondovì". On 15 April 1952, the 4th Alpini Regiment joined the newly formed Alpine Brigade "Taurinense". On 1 January 1953, the Battalion "Mondovì" was renamed Recruits Training Battalion and on the same date the regiment began the process of reforming the Alpini Battalion "Mondovì". The 4th Alpini Regiment now consisted of the Alpini Battalion "Mondovì", which was one of the traditional battalions of the 1st Alpini Regiment, the Alpini Battalion "Aosta", which was one of the traditional battalions of the 4th Alpini Regiment, the Alpini Battalion "Saluzzo", which was one of the traditional battalions of the 2nd Alpini Regiment, the Alpini Battalion "Susa", which was one of the traditional battalions of the 3rd Alpini Regiment, and the 4th Mortar Company.

On 1 November 1962, the Alpini Battalion "Mondovì" moved from Bra in Piedmont to Paluzza in Friuli-Venezia Giulia, where the battalion joined the 8th Alpini Regiment of the Alpine Brigade "Julia". The battalion continued to be manned by recruits drafted in Piedmont. On 1 January 1965, the Alpini Battalion "Mondovì" added the 103rd Mortar Company. On 31 December 1974, the Alpini Battalion "Mondovì" was reduced to a reserve unit.

During the 1975 army reform the army disbanded the regimental level and newly independent battalions were granted for the first time their own flags. On 1 June 1975, the Alpini Battalion "Mondovì" in Paluzza was disbanded. On 1 October 1975, the Recruits Training Battalion "Cuneense" in Cuneo was renamed Alpini Battalion "Mondovì" and assigned to the Alpine Brigade "Taurinense". On 12 November 1976 the President of the Italian Republic Giovanni Leone assigned with decree 846 the flag and traditions of the 1st Alpini Regiment to the Alpini Battalion "Mondovì".

- Alpini Battalion "Mondovì", in Cuneo
  - Command and Services Company
  - 9th, 10th, 11th, and 103rd Alpini Company

=== Recent times ===
On 31 August 1997, the Alpini Battalion "Mondovì" was disbanded and the flag of the 1st Alpini Regiment transferred to the Shrine of the Flags in the Vittoriano in Rome.

On 1 October 2022, the flag and traditions of the 1st Alpini Regiment were assigned to the Command and Tactical Supports Unit "Taurinense" of the Alpine Brigade "Taurinense". On the same day the unit was renamed 1st Alpini Command and Tactical Supports Unit.

== Organization ==
As of 2024 the 1st Alpini Command and Tactical Supports Unit is organized as follows:

- 1st Alpini Command and Tactical Supports Unit, in Turin
  - Command and Logistic Support Company
  - 111th Signal Company

== See also ==
- Alpine Brigade "Taurinense"
