= 8th Air Brigade =

Argentine military unit

- VIII Brigada Aérea
- Active: 5 January 1976
- Disbanded: 7 March 1988
- Country: Argentina
- Branch: Argentine Air Force
- Type: Military aviation
- Role: Fighter
- Garrison/HQ: José C. Paz, Buenos Aires
- Engagements: Falklands War

Commanders
- Notable commanders: Atilio Triulzi; C. A. Corino

Insignia
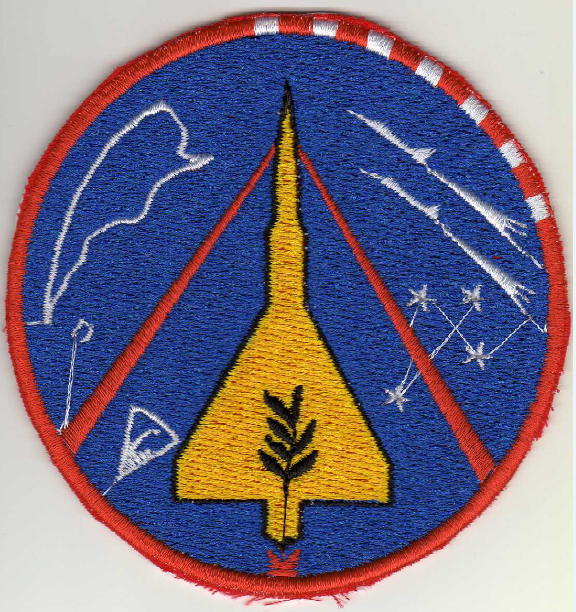
- Identification symbol

Aircraft flown
- Interceptor: Dassault Mirage IIIEA (10); Dassault Mirage IIIDA (2)

The 8th Air Brigade was an Argentine Air Force brigade that existed between 1976 and 1988 based at the Mariano Moreno Airport near Buenos Aires. It was created upon the procurement of Mirage III fighter planes and fought during the Falklands War.

== History ==
In 1970, Argentina bought 12 Mirage III interceptors, which were designated the Mariano Moreno Squadron.

In 1973, the Mariano Moreno Military Air Base was established, and the squadron became the 1st Fighter-Interceptor Squadron. Then, in 1976, they became the 8th (VIII) Air Brigade and the 8th Operations Group, later renamed the 8th Fighter Group.

In 1988, the Air Force disbanded the 8th Fighter Group and transferred the aircraft to the 6th Fighter Group, based in Tandil. The VIII Air Brigade was dissolved, as well.

== Falklands War ==
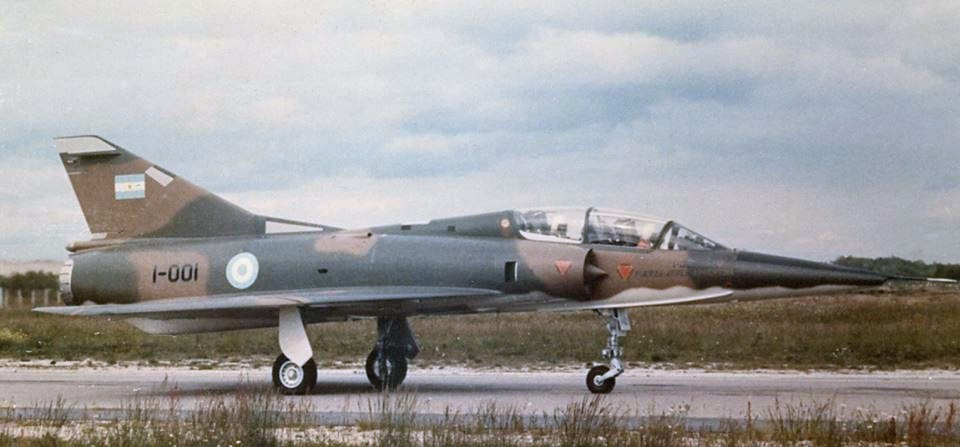
Mirage IIIDA "I-001".

In 1982, the G8C was deployed to Patagonia, concentrating the Mirage Squadrons at the bases of Comodoro Rivadavia and Rio Gallegos. They were to defend the mainland against possible British attacks by long-range Avro Vulcan bombers and carrier-borne Sea Harriers. The Mirages were armed with air-to-air missiles, two R-550 and one R-530, and equipped with two additional fuel tanks.

=== Pilots ===
Service record
- Part of: South Air Force
- Commanders: Major H. Paez; Major J. Sánchez
- Operations: 56 missions

- Major José Sánchez.
- Major Luna.
- Captain G. Ballesteros.
- Captain G. A. García Cuerva (dead).
- Captain Ricardo González.
- Captain Raúl Gambandé.
- Captain Carlos Arnau.
- Captain Marcos Czerwinski.
- Captain Jorge Huck.
- 1st Lieutenant Perona.
- 1st Lieutenant Yebra.
- 1st Lieutenant Marcelo Puig.
- 1st Lieutenant Carlos Selles.
- 1st Lieutenant Alberto Maggi.
- 1st Lieutenant Bosich.

== Order of battle ==
- 8th Air Brigade.
  - 8th Fighter Group.
  - 8th Technical Group.
  - 8th Base Group.
