= 8th Brigade =

8th Brigade may refer to:

== Argentina ==
- 8th Air Brigade (Argentina)
- VIII Mountain Brigade (Argentina)

== Australia ==
- 8th Brigade (Australia)

== Canada ==
- 8th Canadian Infantry Brigade

== China ==
- 8th Armored Brigade (People's Republic of China)
- 8th Fighter Brigade

== Greece ==
- 8th Motorized Infantry Brigade (Greece)

== India ==
- 8th Indian Infantry Brigade in the Second World War
- 8th (Jullundur) Brigade in the First World War
- 8th (Lucknow) Cavalry Brigade in the First World War

== Israel ==
- 8th Armored Brigade (Israel)

== Lebanon ==
- 8th Infantry Brigade (Lebanon)

== New Zealand ==
- 8th Brigade (New Zealand)

== Republika Srpska ==
- 8th Motorized Brigade (Army of Republika Srpska)

== Romania ==
- 8th Tactical Operational Missile Brigade (Romania)

== Russia ==
- 8th Guards Mountain Motor Rifle Brigade

== Spain ==
- 8th Mixed Brigade

== Syria ==
- Eighth Brigade (Syria)

== United Kingdom ==
- 8th Armoured Brigade (United Kingdom)
- 8th Cavalry Brigade (United Kingdom)
- 8th Cyclist Brigade
- 8th Engineer Brigade
- 8th Infantry Brigade (United Kingdom)
- 8th Mounted Brigade
- 8th Provisional Brigade
- 8th Reserve Brigade
- 8th Support Group
- VIII Brigade RAF

=== Artillery units ===
- 8th County of London Brigade, Royal Field Artillery
- 8th (Howitzer) Brigade Royal Field Artillery
- VIII Brigade, Royal Horse Artillery

== United States ==
- 8th Medical Brigade
- 8th Military Police Brigade (United States)
- 8th Reserve Officers' Training Corps Brigade

== See also ==
- 8th Division (disambiguation)
- 8th Regiment (disambiguation)
