= Eighth Regiment Armory =

Eighth Regiment Armory can refer to:

- Eighth Regiment Armory (Bronx)
- Eighth Regiment Armory (Chicago)
