= 8th Siberian Rifle Division =

- 8-я Сибирская стрелковая дивизия
- Active: 1904–1918
- Country: Russian Empire
- Branch: (Russian Empire) Russian Imperial Army
- Role: Infantry
- Part of: 3rd Siberian Army Corps
- Garrison/HQ: Krasnoyarsk
- Engagements: Russo-Japanese War; World War I

Commanders
- Notable commanders: Leonid Artamonov

The 8th Siberian Rifle Division (Russian: 8-я Сибирская стрелковая дивизия; 8-ya Sibirskaya Strelkovaya Diviziya) was an infantry unit of the Imperial Russian Army. The division was formed in 1904 from a brigade, fighting in the Russo-Japanese War and World War I.

== History ==
On 30 October 1903, the 8th East Siberian Rifle Brigade was formed with the 29th, 30th, 31st, and 32nd East Siberian Rifle Regiments, under the command of Leonid Artamonov. The brigade became a division on 22 April 1904 and was based at Krasnoyarsk. Its 1st Brigade at Krasnoyarsk included the 29th (Achinsk) and 30th Regiments (Krasnoyarsk), and its 2nd Brigade at Krasnoyarsk and later Kansk included the 31st (Krasnoyarsk) and 32nd Regiments (Kansk). Vladimir May-Mayevsky was division chief of staff between 1904 and 1906. The division participated in the Russo-Japanese War in 1904 and 1905, part of the 2nd Siberian Rifle Corps. It fought in the Battle of Shaho and the Battle of Sandepu. The division was redesignated the 8th Siberian Rifle Division in 1910. In 1914, it was part of the 3rd Siberian Army Corps and also included the 8th Siberian Rifle Artillery Brigade.

During World War I, the division and its corps were transferred to the Northwestern Front. The division fought in the Second Battle of the Masurian Lakes in late February 1915. The division was the first unit of its corps to reach the important Biebrza River crossing at Sztabin. This enabled the 3rd Siberian Corps and the 26th Army Corps to cross the river and escape a German encirclement. Future Red Army commander August Kork served as a staff officer with the division in late 1915. The division was disbanded in 1918.
