= 8th Regiment =

8th Regiment may refer to:

== United States ==
- 8th Alabama Infantry Regiment
- 8th Missouri Cavalry Regiment
- 8th Missouri Infantry Regiment (disambiguation), several units
- 8th Marine Regiment
- 8th Cavalry Regiment
- 8th Infantry Regiment (United States)

== United Kingdom ==
- 8th (The King's) Regiment of Foot

== See also ==
- Eighth Regiment Armory (disambiguation)
