= 37th Infantry Regiment "Ravenna" =

Inactive Italian Army infantry unit

- 37° Reggimento Fanteria "Ravenna"
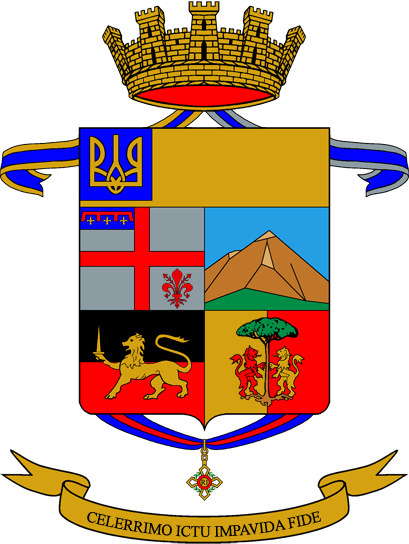
- Regimental coat of arms
- Active: 31 May 1859 – 12 Sept. 1943; 1 Oct. 1975 – 28 Feb. 1991
- Country: Italy
- Branch: Italian Army
- Part of: Mechanized Brigade "Trieste"
- Garrison/HQ: Bologna
- Motto: "Celerrimo ictu impavida fide"
- Anniversaries: 15 June 1918 – Second Battle of Monte Grappa
- Decorations: 1× Military Order of Italy; 1× Gold Medal of Military Valor; 1× Silver Medal of Military Valor

Insignia
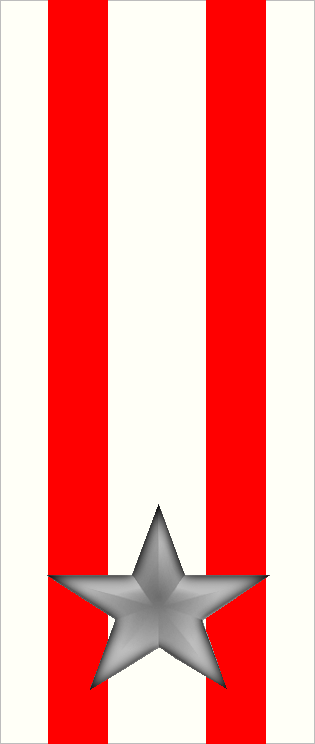
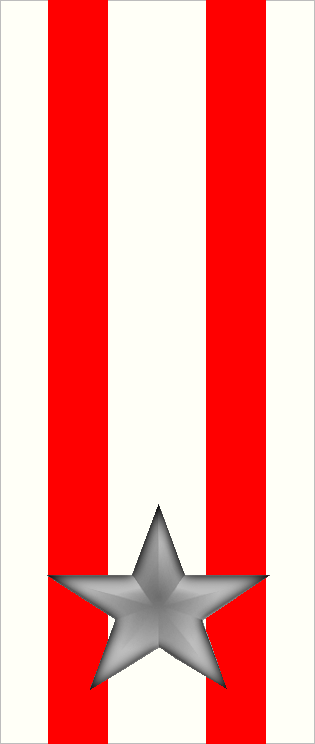
- Regimental gorget patches

The 37th Infantry Regiment "Ravenna" (Italian: 37° Reggimento Fanteria "Ravenna") is an inactive unit of the Italian Army last based in Bologna. The regiment is named for the city of Ravenna and part of the Italian Army's infantry arm. On 31 May 1859, two regiments were formed in Arezzo for the Second Italian War of Independence. During the war the two regiments occupied Rimini, where the regiments were assigned to the XI Brigade, which was soon renamed Brigade "Ravenna". On 1 January 1860, the two regiments were renumbered 37th Infantry Regiment and 38th Infantry Regiment, and on 25 March 1860, the regiments joined the Royal Sardinian Army.

In 1866, the 37th Infantry Regiment participated in the Third Italian War of Independence and in 1911–12, it fought in the Italo-Turkish War. In World War I the regiment fought on the Italian front. During World War II, the regiment was assigned to the 3rd Infantry Division "Ravenna", with which it fought in the Invasion of Yugoslavia and from summer 1942 in the Soviet Union. The "Ravenna" division and its regiments were destroyed during the Red Army's Operation Little Saturn. In June 1943, the "Ravenna" division its regiments were reformed, but after the announcement of the Armistice of Cassibile on 8 September 1943 the division was disbanded by invading German forces.

In 1975, the regiment's flag and traditions were assigned to the 37th Mechanized Infantry Battalion "Ravenna", which was assigned to the Mechanized Brigade "Trieste". In 1991, the battalion was disbanded and the flag of the 37th Infantry Regiment "Ravenna" transferred to the Shrine of the Flags in the Vittoriano in Rome. The regiment's anniversary falls on 15 June 1916, the first day of the Second Battle of Monte Grappa, during which the regiment distinguished itself and was awarded a Silver Medal of Military Valor.

== History ==
=== Formation ===
On 21 July 1858, French Emperor Napoleon III and the Prime Minister of Sardinia Camillo Benso, Count of Cavour met in Plombières and reached a secret verbal agreement on a military alliance between the Second French Empire and the Kingdom of Sardinia against the Austrian Empire. On 26 January 1859, Napoleon III signed the Franco-Sardinian Treaty, followed by King Victor Emmanuel II on 29 January 1859. On 9 March 1859, Sardinia mobilized its army, followed by Austria on 9 April. On 23 April, Austria delivered an ultimatum to Sardinia demanding its demobilization. Upon Sardinia's refusal, Austria declared war on 26 April and three days later the Austrians crossed the Ticino river into Piedmont. Consequently, France honored its alliance with Sardinia and declared war on Austria on 3 May 1859.

On 27 April 1859, Leopold II, Grand Duke of Tuscany refused popular demands to join the war against Austria, which led to an uprising in Florence, the capital of the Grand Duchy of Tuscany. As the Tuscan Army sided with the people, Leopold II fled the same day to the Austrian garrison in Bologna in the Papal Legations of the Romagne. The evening of the same day, 27 April 1859, the city council of Florence formed the Provisional Government of Tuscany, which was led by Ubaldino Peruzzi, Vincenzo Malenchini, and Alessandro Danzini. The next day Victor Emmanuel II nominated the Sardinian ambassador in Florence Carlo Bon Compagni di Mombello as new head of state of the Grand Duchy. On 29 April 1859, a depot was formed in Arezzo to train and equip volunteers, who had arrived from the Emilia region. On 23 May 1859, the 5th French Corps landed in Livorno and on 29 May the Grand Duchy of Tuscany joined the Franco-Sardinian alliance against Austria.

On 31 May 1859, the volunteers, which had been trained by the depot in Arezzo, were used to form the 1st Regiment and 2nd Regiment, which were assigned to the II Army Corps of Central Italy. On 18 June 1859, the two regiments were renamed 19th Infantry Regiment and 20th Infantry Regiment. On 24 June, the two regiments were assigned to the newly formed XI Brigade. The brigade was then sent to occupy Rimini in the Papal Legations of the Romagne. On 12 July 1859, the Second Italian War of Independence ended with the Armistice of Villafranca, which called for the rulers of the Grand Duchy of Tuscany, the Duchy of Modena and Reggio, and the Duchy of Parma and Piacenza, which all had fled their nations, to be restored to their thrones. However neither Sardinia nor the Sardinian installed governments in the three nations wished for a return of the rulers.

On 16 September 1859, the XI Brigade was renamed Brigade "Ravenna". On 30 November 1859, the Duchy of Parma and Piacenza, Duchy of Modena and Reggio, and the Papal Legations of the Romagne were united under the Royal Government of Emilia, which on 1 January 1860 was redesignated as the Royal Provinces of Emilia. On the same date, the 19th and 20th infantry regiments took their place in the progressive numerical order of the regiments of the Royal Sardinian Army and became the 37th Infantry Regiment (Brigade "Ravenna") and 38th Infantry Regiment (Brigade "Ravenna"). On 11 and 12 March 1860, the Royal Provinces of Emilia and the Grand Duchy of Tuscany voted in a plebiscite for annexation by the Kingdom of Sardinia. On 18 March 1860, the annexation act was presented to Victor Emmanuel II and one week later, on 25 March 1860, the Brigade "Ravenna" and its two regiments were formally incorporated into the Royal Sardinian Army.

=== Third Italian War of Independence ===
On 1 August 1862, the 37th Infantry Regiment (Brigade "Ravenna") ceded its 17th Company and 18th Company to help form the 70th Infantry Regiment (Brigade "Ancona"). In 1866, the Brigade "Ravenna" participated in the Third Italian War of Independence, during which the brigade fought in the defeat of the Austrian bridgehead on the Southern bank of the Po river at Borgoforte and the Austrian fort in Borgoforte. On 25 October 1871, the brigade level was abolished, and the two regiments of the Brigade "Ravenna" were renamed 37th Infantry Regiment "Ravenna", respectively 38th Infantry Regiment "Ravenna". On 2 January 1881, the brigade level was reintroduced, and the two regiments were renamed again as 37th Infantry Regiment (Brigade "Ravenna") and 38th Infantry Regiment (Brigade "Ravenna").

On 1 November 1884, the 37th Infantry Regiment ceded some of its companies to help form the 79th Infantry Regiment (Brigade "Roma"). In 1887–88 the regiment's 3rd Company deployed to Massawa for the Italo-Ethiopian War of 1887–1889. Although part of the 3rd Company was wiped out in the Battle of Dogali on 26 January 1887, the war led to the establishment of the Italian colony of Eritrea. In 1895–96, the regiment provided twelve officers and 225 enlisted for units deployed to Italian Eritrea for the First Italo-Ethiopian War.

=== Italo-Turkish War ===
In 1911, the 37th Infantry Regiment was deployed to Libya for the Italo-Turkish War. On 4 December 1911, the regiment fought in the Battle of Ain Zara and on 8 June 1912, the regiment fought in the Battle of Zanzur. In 1913, the regiment remained in Libya and on 18 June 1913, the regiment fought in the Battle of Ettangi against local rebels.

=== World War I ===
At the outbreak of World War I, the Brigade "Ravenna" formed, together with the Brigade "Forlì" and the 23rd Field Artillery Regiment, the 3rd Division. At the time the 37th Infantry Regiment consisted of three battalions, each of which fielded four fusilier companies and one machine gun section. On 2 February 1915, the depot of the 37th Infantry Regiment in Alessandria formed the 155th Infantry Regiment and on 1 March 1915, the depot formed the command of the Brigade "Alessandria", which on the same date was assigned the 155th Infantry Regiment. After Italy's entry into the war on 23 May 1915, the Brigade "Ravenna" was deployed in Cividale, from where it advanced over the mountains to Plave on the Isonzo river. On 9 June 1915, the brigade crossed the Isonzo and established a bridgehead, but was unable to take the heights overlooking the crossing. By evening of 13 June, the brigade had lost more than 1,500 men and further attacks were called off. The brigade was then sent to the Sabotin hill, where it fought in the Second Battle of the Isonzo. Afterwards the brigade was sent back to Plave bridgehead, which had been extended to the village of Zagora. On 21 October 1915, during the Third Battle of the Isonzo, the brigade attacked from Zagora towards Zagomila. The brigade suffered 1,300 casualties until 4 November, when the attack was called off and the brigade sent to the rear.

In May 1916, the brigade was sent to the Asiago plateau, where the Italian lines were crumbling under intense Austro-Hungarian attacks during the Battle of Asiago. On 25 June, the Austro-Hungarian forces ended their offensive and fell back to the Northern side of the Asiago plateau, which allowed the Brigade "Ravenna" to occupy the summits of Monte Priaforà and Monte Gamonda. After the front on the Asiago plateau had stabilized the brigade returned to the Isonzo river, where it fought in November 1916 at Vrtojba during the Ninth Battle of the Isonzo. In May 1917, the brigade was again deployed at Vrtojba during the Tenth Battle of the Isonzo. In August 1917, the brigade was sent to the Banjšice plateau, where it fought in the Eleventh Battle of the Isonzo. The brigade remained in the Banjšice sector until the Battle of Caporetto forced the Italians to retreat behind the Piave river. On 25 October 1917, the brigade began its retreat and on 25 October crossed the Isonzo at Plave. The next day the brigade crossed the Torre river. On 30 October the brigade's two regiments split up with the 37th Infantry Regiment retreating towards Santa Maria di Sclaunicco, while the 38th Infantry Regiment retreated towards Lestizza and Mortegliano, where the brigade's command and a large part of the 38th Infantry Regiment were overrun and captured by Austro-Hungarian forces. On 31 October, the 37th Infantry Regiment crossed the Tagliamento river at Madrisio and then retreated to the bridges over the Piave at Priula. The remnants of the brigade were then sent to Venegazzù. There the brigade was reorganized on 6 November and then consisted of the 37th Infantry Regiment with the surviving troops of the Brigade "Ravenna", the 67th Infantry Regiment with the surviving troops of the Brigade "Palermo", and the 85th Infantry Regiment with the surviving troops of the Brigade "Verona"). To bring the three regiments back to full strength the few surviving troops of the brigades "Sele", "Campobasso", and "Pescara" were assigned to the three regiments of the Brigade "Ravenna". On 16 November 1917, the 38th Infantry Regiment was reformed and returned to the brigade, which on the same day ceded the 67th Infantry Regiment and 85th Infantry Regiment to other units.

On 25 November 1917, the brigade was transferred to the Monte Grappa massif to reinforce the Italian positions between Col dell'Orso and Monte Solarolo during the First Battle of Monte Grappa. In early December the 37th Infantry Regiment was sent to defend Monte Spinoncia, while the 38th Infantry Regiment was tasked with the defense of Monte Valderoa. On 11 December 1917, the 37th Infantry Regiment came under heavy attack, and after losing almost 500 men had to abandon the summit of Monte Spinoncia. From 14 to 17 December 1917, the 38th Infantry Regiment was attacked, but managed to hold its positions. The brigade, which had suffered more than 1,650 casualties since arriving on the Monte Grappa, remained on the massif until 11 May 1918. In June 1918, during the Second Battle of the Piave River the brigade was again deployed on the Monte Grappa, where its troops withstood a series of furious Austro-Hungarian attacks. On 4–5 July and 14–15 July 1918, the brigade tried unsuccessfully to take the summit of Monte Solarolo on the Monte Grappa. During the decisive Battle of Vittorio Veneto the brigade was deployed on the Piave front. On 27 October 1918, the brigade crossed the Piave river at Salettuol and pursued the retreating enemy. For its conduct and bravery on the Banjšice plateau in August 1917 and on Monte Grappa in June and July 1918, the 37th Infantry Regiment was awarded a Silver Medal of Military Valor, which was affixed to the regiment's flag and added to its coat of arms.

=== Interwar years ===
On 10 October 1926, the command of the Brigade "Ravenna" was disbanded. On the same date the 37th Infantry Regiment was renamed 37th Infantry Regiment "Ravenna" and assigned to the III Infantry Brigade, while the 38th Infantry Regiment was renamed 38th Infantry Regiment "Ravenna" and assigned to the IV Infantry Brigade. The III Infantry Brigade, which had been formed by renaming the Brigade "Forlì", also included the 43rd Infantry Regiment "Forlì" and 44th Infantry Regiment "Forlì". The brigade was the infantry component of the 3rd Territorial Division of Alessandria, which also included the 11th Field Artillery Regiment.

In 1930, the III Infantry Brigade transferred the 44th Infantry Regiment "Forlì" to the IV Infantry Brigade and received in turn the 38th Infantry Regiment "Ravenna". On 1 April 1934, the III Infantry Brigade transferred the 38th Infantry Regiment "Ravenna" to the XXVI Infantry Brigade "Assietta" and received in turn the 30th Infantry Regiment "Pisa". During the same year, the 3rd Territorial Division of Alessandria changed its name to 3rd Infantry Division "Monferrato". A name change that also extended to the division's infantry brigade. In 1935–36 the 37th Infantry Regiment "Ravenna" provided ten officers and 125 troops to units deployed to East Africa for the Second Italo-Ethiopian War.

On 25 March 1939, the 30th Infantry Regiment "Pisa" was transferred to the 26th Infantry Division "Assietta", which in turn returned the 38th Infantry Regiment "Ravenna". On 31 March 1939, the 43rd Infantry Regiment "Forlì" was transferred to the newly formed 36th Infantry Division "Forlì". On the same date the III Infantry Brigade "Monferrato" was disbanded and its infantry regiments came under direct command of the 3rd Infantry Division "Monferrato", which was renamed 3rd Infantry Division "Ravenna".

=== World War II ===
At the outbreak of World War II, the 37th Infantry Regiment "Ravenna" consisted of a command, a command company, three fusilier battalions, a support weapons battery equipped with 65/17 infantry support guns, and a mortar company equipped with 81mm Mod. 35 mortars. On 10 June 1940, Italy entered World War II by invading France. During the invasion of France the "Ravenna" division advanced to the French village of Fontan. On 24 June 1940, the Franco-Italian Armistice was signed and the division returned to its bases. In April 1941, the "Ravenna" division participated in the Invasion of Yugoslavia and then mopped-up Yugoslav forces in Škofja Loka and near Mirna. In May 1941 the division returned to its bases in Piedmont.

==== Eastern Front ====
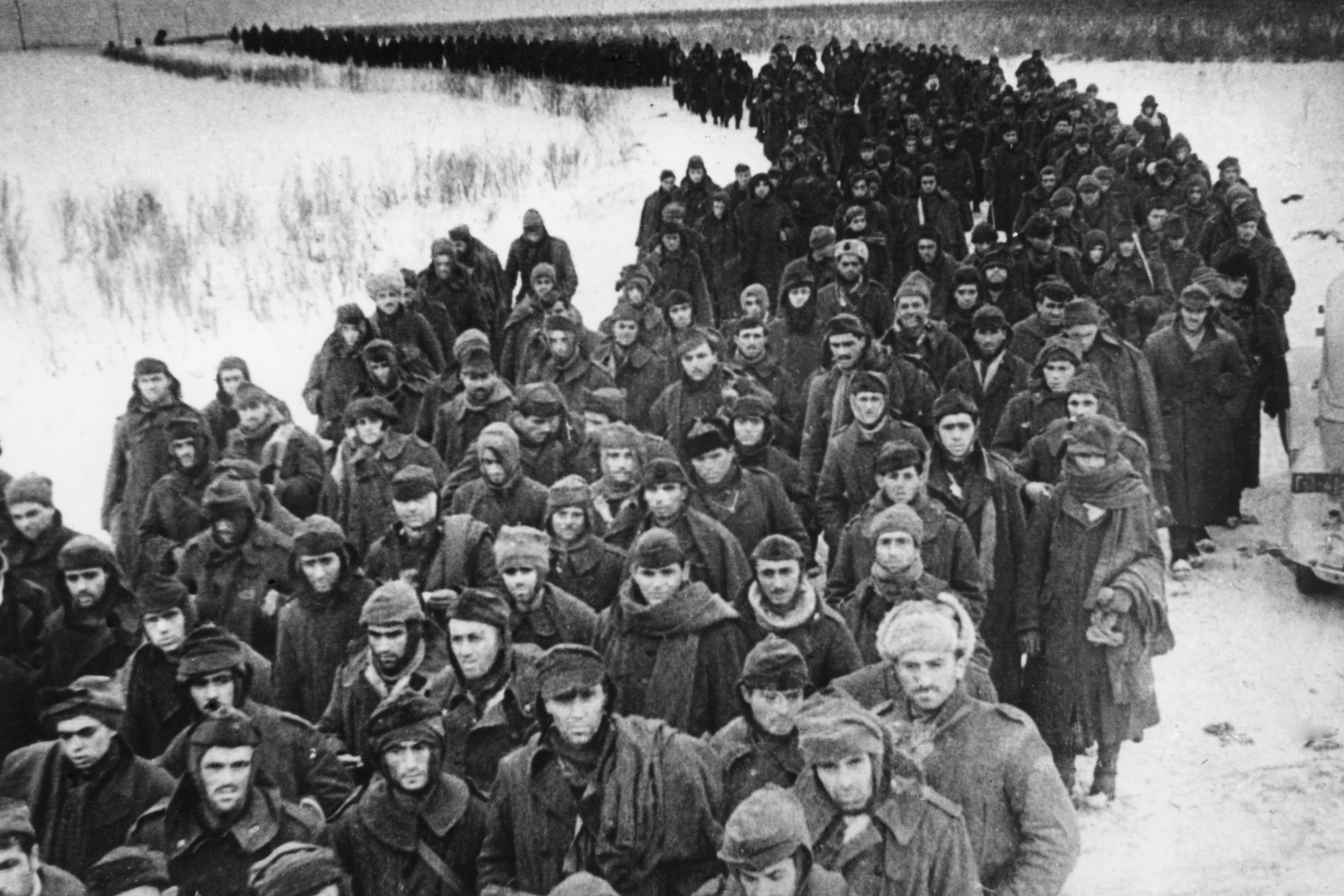
Italian troops captured during Operation Little Saturn

In spring 1942, the "Ravenna" division was assigned to the Italian 8th Army, which was readied to be deployed in summer 1942 to the Eastern Front. Before leaving Italy the division transferred the 11th Artillery Regiment "Ravenna" to the 104th Infantry Division "Mantova", which in turn transferred the 121st Motorized Artillery Regiment to the "Ravenna" division. In July 1942, the division arrived in Donetsk in Eastern Ukraine and was assigned to the Italian XXXV Army Corps. The division then advanced to Luhansk and from there to the Don river, where the division took up defensive positions between Verhny Mamon and Boguchar. Between 20 August and 1 September 1942, the "Ravenna" division defeated a series of Soviet attacks.

On 12 December 1942, Soviet forces began Operation Little Saturn during which the "Ravenna" division was annihilated. On 17 December 1942, the bulk of the "Ravenna" division retreated from the Don river to Voroshilovgrad, where the division reorganized itself on 21 December: the few survivors of the three battalions of the 37th Infantry Regiment "Ravenna" were grouped into a single battalion, while the I Battalion of the 38th Infantry Regiment "Ravenna" was disbanded and its survivors used to reinforce the regiment's II Battalion and III Battalion. The division then returned to the front and from 22 to 30 December 1942, defended the bridges over the Donets river at Veselaya Gora and Stanytsia Luhanska. During the retreat to Luhansk elements of the "Ravenna" division had been separated from the division. These elements, together with other German and Italian units, were encircled by Soviet forces on 23 December 1942 near Chertkovo. The encircled units withstood repeated Soviet attacks and on 15 January 1943, the "Ravenna" division attacked and opened an escape route for the encircled units. On 24 January 1943, the Soviets broke through the Donets front and the "Ravenna" division was forced to retreat again. On 17 January 1943, the division's remnants reached Bilovodsk and were taken out of the front. In April 1943, the remnants of the division were repatriated.

For their conduct in the Soviet Union and their sacrifice during Operation Little Saturn the 37th Infantry Regiment "Ravenna" and 38th Infantry Regiment "Ravenna" were both awarded a Gold Medal of Military Valor. The medals were affixed to the regiments' flags and added to their coats of arms.

After its return to Italy the 37th Infantry Regiment "Ravenna" was sent to Chiusi in Tuscany, where the process began to rebuild the regiment. On 8 September 1943, the Armistice of Cassibile was announced and the "Ravenna" division and its regiments were disbanded four days later, on 12 September 1943, by invading German forces.

=== Cold War ===
During the 1975 army reform the army disbanded the regimental level and newly independent battalions were granted for the first time their own flags. On 30 September 1975, the 40th Infantry Regiment "Bologna" in Bologna was disbanded. The next day the regiment's III Battalion in Bologna became an autonomous unit and was renamed 37th Mechanized Infantry Battalion "Ravenna". On the same date the regiment's I Battalion and II Battalion became autonomous units and were renamed 40th Mechanized Infantry Battalion "Bologna" and 66th Mechanized Infantry Battalion "Valtellina". The three battalions were assigned to the Mechanized Brigade "Trieste" and each of them consisted of a command, a command and services company, three mechanized companies with M113 armored personnel carriers, and a heavy mortar company with M106 mortar carriers with 120mm Mod. 63 mortars. At the time each of the three battalions fielded 896 men (45 officers, 100 non-commissioned officers, and 751 soldiers).

On 12 November 1976, the President of the Italian Republic Giovanni Leone assigned with decree 846 the flag and traditions of the 37th Infantry Regiment "Ravenna" to the 40th Mechanized Infantry Battalion "Ravenna".

=== Recent times ===
With the end of the Cold War the Italian Army began to draw down its forces. On 28 February 1991, the 37th Mechanized Infantry Battalion "Ravenna" was disbanded and the following 6 March the flag of the 37th Infantry Regiment "Ravenna" was transferred to the Shrine of the Flags in the Vittoriano in Rome.
