= Krstenica =

- Location in Slovenia
- Coordinates: 46°4′19.76″N 13°37′24.34″E
- Country: Slovenia
- Traditional region: Littoral
- Statistical region: Gorizia
- Municipality: Kanal ob Soči

Area
  - Total: 0.52 km^{2} (0.20 sq mi)
- Elevation: 152.4 m (500 ft)

Krstenica (pronounced [kəɾstɛˈniːtsa]) is a small settlement on the right bank of the Soča River between Kanal and Anhovo in the Littoral region of Slovenia. Until 2007, the area was part of the settlement of Gorenja Vas.

The local church is dedicated to Saint Nicholas and belongs to the parish of Kanal.
