= Ukanje =

- Location in Slovenia
- Coordinates: 46°5′18.83″N 13°34′51.24″E
- Country: Slovenia
- Traditional region: Littoral
- Statistical region: Gorizia
- Municipality: Kanal ob Soči

Area
  - Total: 4.22 km^{2} (1.63 sq mi)
- Elevation: 314 m (1,030 ft)

Population (2002)
  - Total: 50

Ukanje (pronounced [ˈuːkanjɛ]) is a settlement in the hills west of Kanal in the Littoral region of Slovenia on the border with Italy.

== Church ==
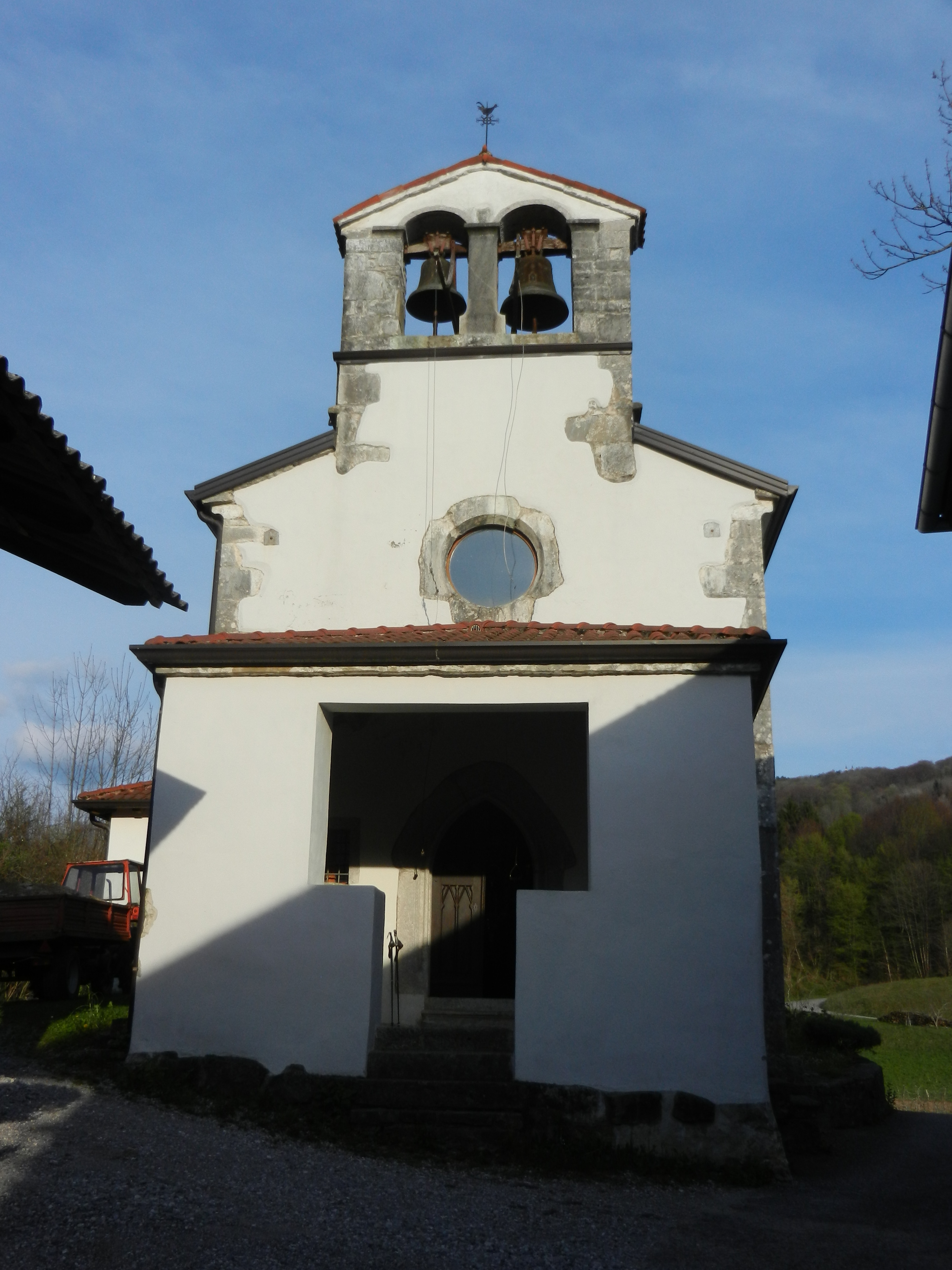
St. Cantianus's Church in Britof

The local church stands in the hamlet of Britof and is dedicated to Saint Cantianus. It belongs to the Parish of Marijino Celje in the Diocese of Koper. It is a Gothic church with a bell gable, built in 1505. The interior houses a Gothic side altar (a replica, the original is kept in the National Gallery of Slovenia), a gilded Baroque altar, and Gothic frescoes. The church is protected as a cultural monument of local significance.
