= Polje (disambiguation) =

Polje is a karst feature.

Polje also translates as field from Croatian and Slovene and may also refer to:

== Bosnia and Herzegovina ==
- Polje, Busovača, a village near Busovača, Bosnia and Herzegovina
- Polje (Cazin), a village near Cazin, Bosnia and Herzegovina
- Polje (Derventa), a village near Derventa, Bosnia and Herzegovina
- Polje (Kalinovik), a village near Kalinovik, Bosnia and Herzegovina
- Polje, Kreševo, a village near Kreševo, Bosnia and Herzegovina
- Polje, Velika Kladuša, a village near Velika Kladuša, Bosnia and Herzegovina
- Polje (Višegrad), a village near Višegrad, Bosnia and Herzegovina

== Croatia ==
- Polje (Krk), a village on the island of Krk, Croatia

== Montenegro ==
- Polje, Bar, a village near Bar

== Slovenia ==
- Polje, Ljubljana, a former village, now part of Ljubljana, Slovenia
- Polje, Bohinj, a village near Bohinj, Slovenia
- Polje, Tolmin, a village near Tolmin, Slovenia
