= Gorenje Polje =

Gorenje Polje may refer to the following places in Slovenia:

- Gorenje Polje, Dolenjske Toplice, a village in the Municipality of Dolenjske Toplice
- Gorenje Polje, Kanal, a village in the Municipality of Kanal

== See also ==
- Polje (disambiguation)
