= Battle of Hill 383 =

Battle in 1915–1917 on the Italian Front during the First World War

- Part of the Italian Front (World War I)
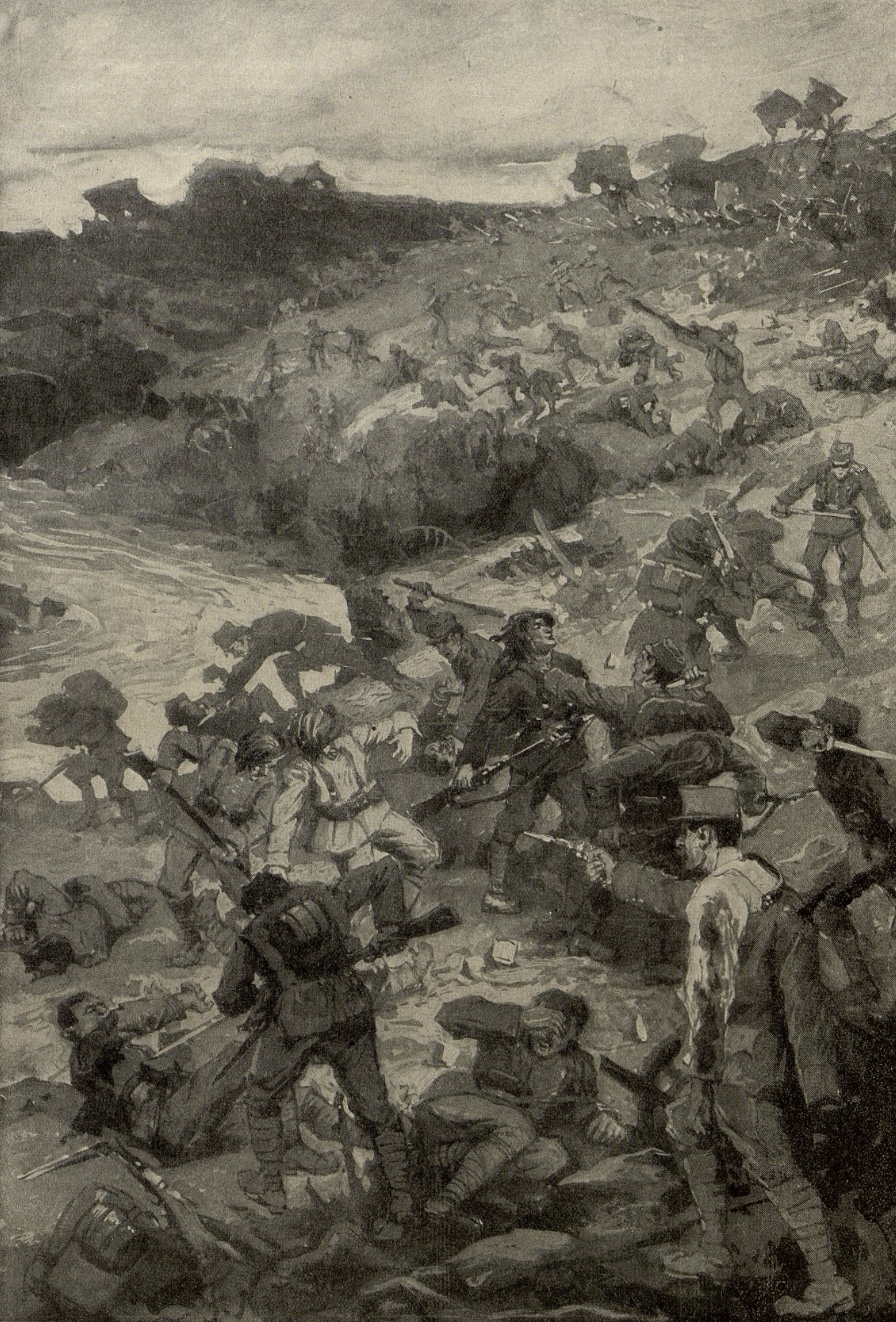
- Austrian illustration of fighting on Hill 383 in June 1915 (1915)
| Date | 9 June 1915 – 14 May 1917 |
| Location | Prižnica mountain near Plave, north-west Slovenia 46°02′37″N 13°35′55″E |
| Result | Final Italian victory |

Belligerents
| Italy | Austria-Hungary |

Commanders and leaders
| (Kingdom of Italy) Luigi Cadorna | (Austria-Hungary) Conrad von Hötzendorf (Austria-Hungary) Archduke Eugen (Austria-Hungary) Svetozar Boroević |
- Location of the battle in Slovenia

The Battle of Hill 383 was a military engagement between the armies of Austria-Hungary and Italy on the Italian front of World War I, lasting from June 1915 to May 1917. The battle took place on a hill later called Mount Prižnica (Italian: Poggio Montanari), located across the river Soča (Italian: Isonzo) from the town of Plave in Austria-Hungary (present-day Slovenia). The Italian and Austro-Hungarian armies clashed for two years in an attempt to occupy it. The fighting continued for the next two years, when Mount Prižnica was taken by Italians during the Tenth Battle of the Isonzo. Just five months after winning the summit, the hill was lost as Italian forces retreated during the disastrously successful combined German and Austro-Hungarian breakthrough at the Battle of Caporetto.

== Background ==
After 23 May 1915, when Italy declared war on Austria-Hungary, Italian High Command led by general Luigi Cadorna planned the first offensive actions on the hard mountain terrain on the Austro-Hungarian-Italian border. As one of the targets they chose Austrian-held Poggio Montanari hill on the border south Austria. This hill, termed Hill 383 (its metric elevation), was meant as a first step towards taking the nearby Mount Kuk, then Gorizia and the Banjšice Plateau. To the Italians, Hill 383 was a key objective to take in the beginning of the war.

To impress the Italian king Victor Emmanuel III, Cadorna invited the monarch for a visit on the front, where he could present him a spectacular Italian victory. During an inspection of the front lines by the king, General Cadorna decided to offer him the spectacle of the conquest of Hill 383, so he prepared an observatory set up on Mount Korada at altitude of 800 meters. Forces chosen for attack were also from 2nd Army Corps commanded by General Gustavo Reisoli. The defenses were commanded by Major General Guido Novak von Arienti.

== Battle ==
On the evening of 9 June, 1915, two battalions of the Ravenna Brigade of the 3rd Division crossed the Isonzo river on a pontoon bridge, established a bridgehead on the eastern bank, and began the climb up the hill. The wooded terrain was defended by a single company of 200 Austrian riflemen from the 1st Mountain Brigade of the 18th Infantry Division. Despite being outnumbered, the steep hillside offered the Italians little protection from the Austro-Hungarian defenders' rifle and machine gun fire, and the assault was postponed until the next day.

On 10 June, the Italian artillery began a heavy bombardment of the enemy area; at 9:30 pm, after sunset, the entire Ravenna Brigade (6 companies) of the 3rd Division, composed of 6000 men, assaulted the Austro-Hungarian defenders of Hill 383. The artillery barrage had deforested the hillside, and the defenders once again managed to repel the assault. The Austro-Hungarian lines were then reinforced with the 900–strong 2nd battalion of the 22nd Regiment from Dalmatia.

On 12 June, the Italians attempted to capture the hill again with six battalions. The soldiers reached the slopes of the mountain undisturbed, but, while they were crossing the first line of wire fences, they were surprised by machine guns and were forced to hastily retreat back to the river. Having reached the banks of the Isonzo, the Italian soldiers were targeted by fire support from an Austro-Hungarian armored train brought from Gorizia, which targeted them with its cannons and machine guns. Under this crossfire the Italian units left over a thousand dead on the ground.

On 16 June, after another highly costly assault, the Italians finally captured the summit, with soldiers of the 2nd Battalion of the 43rd Division raising the Italian flag over the battlefield. Early on the morning of the 17th, after the Italian soldiers had celebrated and went to sleep, the Austro-Hungarian forces mounted a desperate counter-attack, re-taking the hilltop.

On 17 June, 6 regiments of veterans of the "Ravenna" and "Forlì" brigades and of the "La Spezia" special corps brigade prepared for an assault on Hill 383. Cadorna, Victor Emmanuel, and the other members of Italian General Staff watched the assault; before beginning, Cadorna declared to the king, then Italians will take the hill at any cost. The following assault uphill on completely exposed terrain against entrenched Austrian machine gun nests led to the deaths of thousands of Italian soldiers.

After 4 of the 6 regiments were lost in the clash, Cadorna stopped the assault and ordered trenches dug on his most advanced line—about 300 meters from the Austrian defenses. A few days later, on 23 June 1915, the First Battle of the Isonzo began. The opening battle for Hill 383 de facto opened the so-called White War warfare, where Austro-Hungarians and Italians were fighting in a steep and high-altitude terrain of the Alps and the Dolomites.

== Temporary Italian Victory ==
Italian attempts to capture Hill 383 and the Banjšice plateau continued for almost two years. The Italian army finally managed to occupy the hill during the beginning of the Tenth Battle of the Isonzo, a major Italian offensive that began on 12 May, 1917. The final engagement consisted of five attacking Italian regiments from the 3rd Division against the 52nd Hungarian Regiment. Like all prior assaults, the terrain and tactical dogma led to many deaths among the attackers. Officers were as exposed as their men: command of the Udine Brigade's leading battalion changed hands 5 times in half an hour. After one year, eleven months, and five days of fighting, the Austro-Hungarian defenses were finally overwhelmed. The defenders that day were outnumbered fifteen to one and had taken 1,521 casualties; they had little chance of holding the hill and the Italians finally attained victory.

Plave, abandoned to the Austo-Hungarian Army, 3 November 1917

The victory was not to last. Just five months after their victory, the hill was lost to the combined Austro-Hungarian and German offensive at the Battle of Caporetto. Over the course of 24–28 October, 1917, the hill, the town of Plave, and the entire Isonzo front were abandoned to advancing Austro-Hungarians.

== Prižnica Memorial Park ==
Remains of the battle are preserved on Prižnica and are connected by a walking trail. Visible elements include military cemeteries and military infrastructure like trenches, a dressing station, and a cabin near a cave used by the Avellino Brigade.

== See also ==
- White War
- First Battle of the Isonzo

== Bibliography ==
- Weber, Fritz (2006). Dal Monte Nero a Caporetto. Milan: Ugo Mursia editore. ISBN 9788842536840.
