= Tenth Battle of the Isonzo =

Battle from May to June 1917 on the Italian Front during the First World War

Coordinates: 46°00′00″N 13°38′00″E

- Part of the Italian Front of World War I
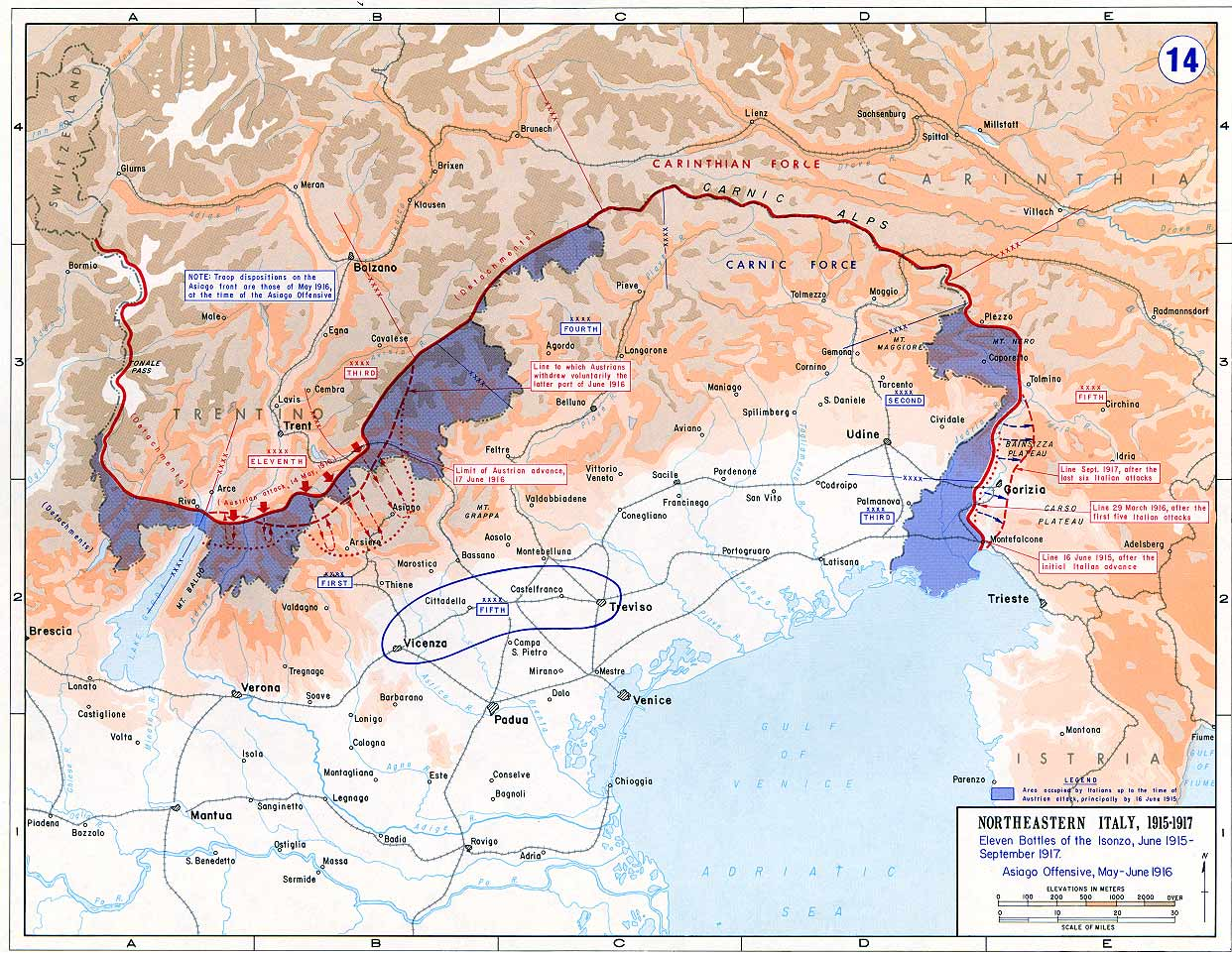
- Eleven Battles of the Isonzo; June 1915 – September 1917
Date	12 May – 8 June 1917
Location	Soča Valley, Slovenia
Result	Indecisive.
Territorial changes	Italians conquer Mount Kuk, Mount Vodice, and Mount Santo, but the latter is reconquered by the Austro-Hungarians.

Belligerents
Italy	Austria-Hungary

Commanders and leaders
(Kingdom of Italy) Luigi Cadorna	(Austria-Hungary) Svetozar Boroević

Strength
400,000	200,000

Casualties and losses
150,000 (35,000 killed)	125,000 (17,000 killed)

The Tenth Battle of the Isonzo was an Italian offensive against Austria-Hungary during World War I.

== Background ==
With nine largely unsuccessful Isonzo battles conducted within an eighteen-month period to date, Italian Chief of Staff Luigi Cadorna – responsible for launching all nine – became increasingly uncomfortable at the prospect of German intervention to aid their weakening Austro-Hungarian ally on the Italian Front.

For while it was clear that the Austro-Hungarian Army was suffering in what had become a war of attrition, the same could be said of Cadorna's army. Casualties suffered to date were tremendous and with each renewed battle tended to be higher on the Italian attackers' side.

The UK's new Prime Minister, David Lloyd George, had long believed that the war could not be won on the Western Front alone. Dubbed an "easterner" at home Lloyd George was nevertheless in favour of diverting British and French resources from the Western Front to the Italians along the Soča (Isonzo), to "knock the props out" from under the Central Powers.

However Lloyd George's own field commanders, including Commander in Chief Douglas Haig – along with the French – disagreed, arguing that resources could not be spared from the Western Front, particularly with French Commander-in-Chief Robert Nivelle's upcoming offensive, aimed at ending the war in the west within 48 hours.

Consequently, Nivelle dispatched Ferdinand Foch to meet with Cadorna and discuss their possible options. In the event the British and French agreed to rush aid to the Italians only in the event of an emergency – for example, large-scale German military assistance to the Austro-Hungarians; a contingency plan was thus developed to meet with such an eventuality.

With the contingency plan arranged the French pressed Cadorna to launch a major offensive of his own along the Soča (Isonzo) to generally co-ordinate with their own large-scale Aisne Offensive (deployed in April 1917). Cadorna agreed and the tenth Isonzo offensive was launched with a preliminary artillery bombardment lasting two days on 12 May 1917.

== The offensive ==
The Italians, deploying 38 divisions against 14 Austro-Hungarian divisions, switched tactics once again. The previous three Isonzo battles had seen Cadorna concentrate short, sharp initiatives against closely defined targets, generally aimed at extending their sole bridgehead east of Gorizia. This time the Italians returned to the Karst Plateau south-east of Gorizia, setting in train an infantry advance along a 40 km front in order to achieve a breakthrough towards Trieste. The second aim of the offensive was to conquer Mount Škabrijel, thus opening the way to the Vipava Valley.

The Italian offensive started the 12 May, with an artillery barrage along the front held by the newly formed Comando della Zona di Gorizia. Bad visibility – there was fog in the early morning – hampered observation and the rate of fire was low at first, only to rise as the fog cleared away. On the sectors garrisoned by the Third Army, the barrage opened at noon, and along the whole frontline lasted until evening. During the night, the Italian artillery fired for interdiction on the Austro-Hungarian supply and ammo depots and on the communication lines. On the morning of the 13th, while the Italian artillery resumed its destruction fire, the Austro-Hungarian artillery reacted for the first time, starting counter-battery fire.

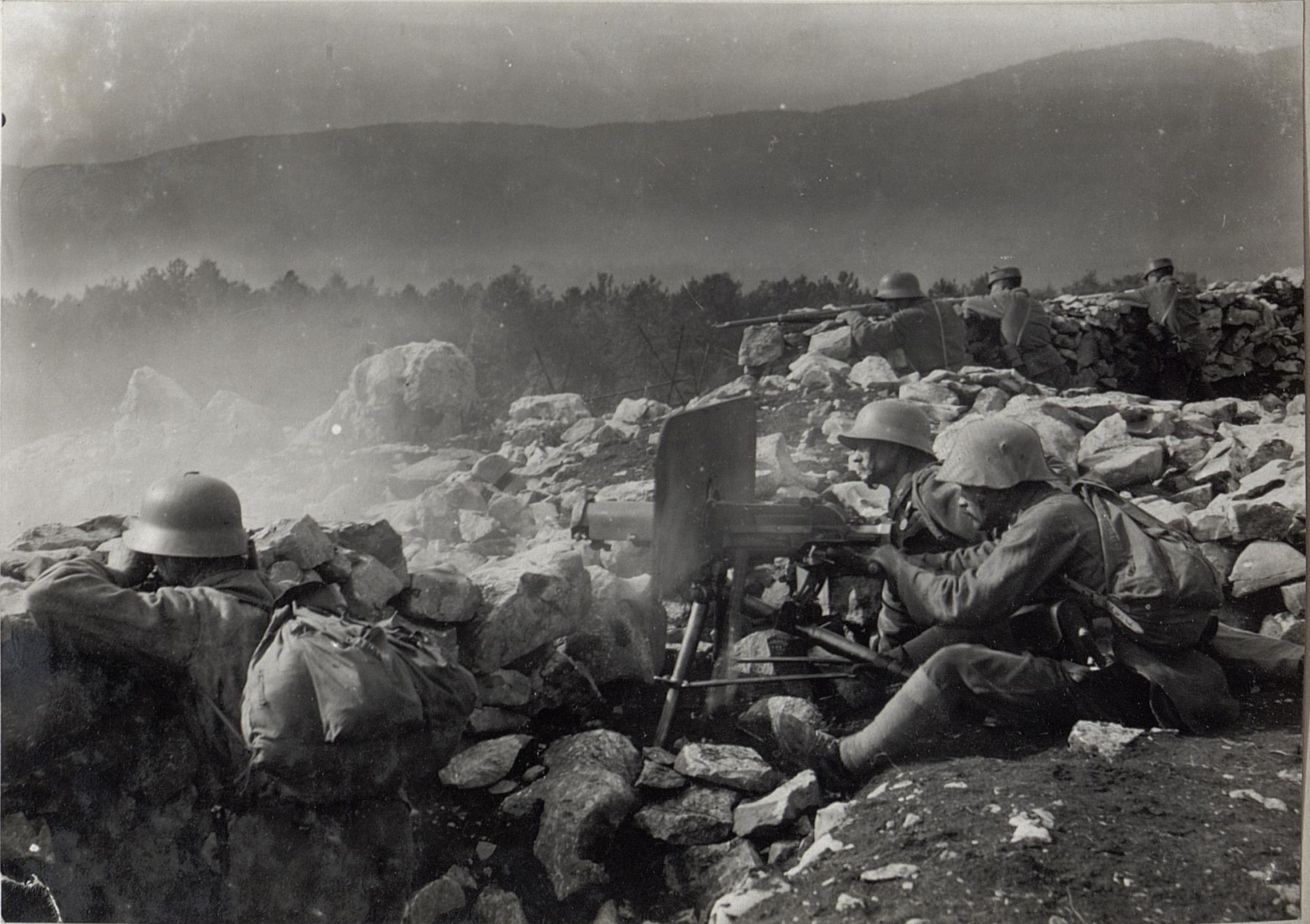
Austro-Hungarian soldiers during the Battle of the Isonzo

The infantry attack was launched at noon on 14 May. In the area of operations of Plave, the II Corps of Badoglio was met by initial successes: the Udine Brigade took quote 383, while the Firenze Brigade reached quote 535 on the Kuk and the Avellino Brigade, going beyond the Sagora barrier, partly occupied the blockhouses of Zagomila, on the road to Mount Vodice. Units of the Campobasso Brigade managed to reach the summit of Mount Sveta Gora, but an Austro-Hungarian night counterattack forced them to abandon it. To the north-east of Gorizia, the Italian troops reached quote 126 and quote 174, near Rožna Dolina, but were not able to maintain those positions. The following day, the II Corps secured the Kuk summit, and gained the saddle of the Vodice, notwithstanding the stubborn Austro-Hungarian resistance.

While the main thrust was underway in the Gorizia sector, the Third Army's XI Corps started its diversionary attacks, employing the 21st and 22nd Division. During these attacks, on 14 May the Pisa, Regina, Brescia and Ferrara Brigades suffered heavy losses. Furthermore, at night a heavy bombardment by Austro-Hungarian artillery forced the survivors to fall back to their starting positions.

In the area between Kostanjevica and Jamiano, the 26 and 27 May the Italian XIII Army Corps managed, after a series of bloody attacks and counterattacks, to gain some ground. The Italian VII Corps slowly advanced on the hills west of Medeazza, reaching the sources of the Timavo. The last significant action of the offensive took place on the 28th, when the Italian Toscana Brigade briefly captured quote 28 (Villaggio del Pescatore), south of the Timavo, but was not able to hold it for long. The operations slowly came to a stop the following day, with only minor actions fought on small portions of the frontline.

Over fifteen days, the Italian forces had advanced within 15 miles (23 kilometers) of Trieste, almost reaching the coastal town of Duino. However, casualties has been, as in previous offensives, high: the Italians lost about 160,000 men (36,000 dead), while the Austro-Hungarians, fighting defensively with the terrain advantage, lost about 125,000 men (17,000 dead).

== Aftermath ==
Most Italian gains were short-lived. A major Austro-Hungarian counter-offensive launched on 3 June reclaimed most of the lost ground. However, the Kuk-Vodice sector remained in Italian hands.

Some fighting also took place in the northern sections of the front in the Julian Alps, where the Austro-Hungarians strengthened their positions along the Vršič mountain ridge.

With morale in the Italian army plunging Cadorna planned one further breakthrough attempt as he massed the greatest number of divisions and artillery yet along the Soča (Isonzo) river. Accordingly, the Eleventh Battle of the Isonzo was initiated some two months later on 19 August 1917.

== See also ==
- Battles of the Isonzo – overview
  - Ninth Battle of the Isonzo – 1–4 November 1916
  - Eleventh Battle of the Isonzo – 19 August – 12 September 1917
