= Josip Ribičič =

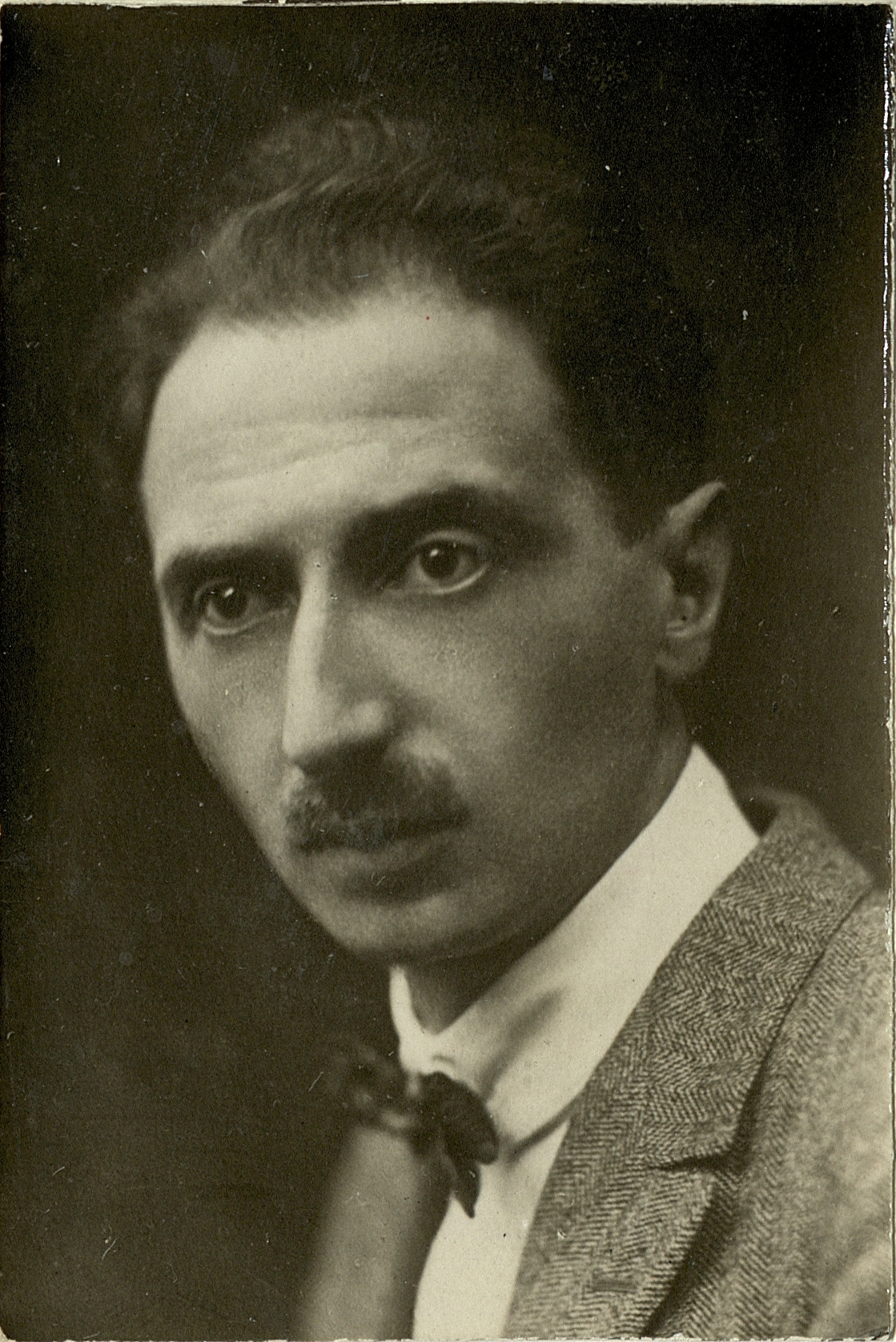
Josip Ribičič

Josip Ribičič (3 November 1886 – 7 June 1969) was a Slovene writer, known as an author of popular children's literature.

== Life ==
He was born as Josip Ribičić in Baška on the island of Krk (now in Croatia, then part of Austria-Hungary). His father Juraj was a Croat from Dalmatia who worked on Krk as an Austro-Hungarian public servant, while his mother Marija Križanič was a Slovene from Gorenja Vas near Kanal ob Soči in what was then the County of Gorizia and Gradisca (now in Slovenia). Josip attended elementary school in Lig, and then enrolled in a teacher's college in Koper. Between 1909 and 1911, he worked as teacher in several elementary schools in the Austrian Littoral, before settling in Trieste in 1911, where he worked as a teacher in a private Slovene-language school in the district of San Giacomo (Slovene: Sveti Jakob). He married a local Slovene woman in 1913.

In 1925, he moved to the Kingdom of Serbs, Croats and Slovenes in order to escape Fascist Italian persecution. He first worked as a teacher in Rakek, and from 1929 in Ljubljana. In 1942, during World War II, he was arrested by the Italian authorities in the annexed Province of Ljubljana, accused of collaboration with the Liberation Front of the Slovenian People and sentenced to 12 years in prison. He was released in 1944 by the Nazi German authorities. After the end of the war, he continued shortly his teaching profession; in 1949, he was employed in the Slovenian Ministry of Education.

He died in Ljubljana. He was the father of the communist official and Yugoslav statesman Mitja Ribičič, and the grandfather of the Slovenian jurist and politician Ciril Ribičič.

== Work ==
Most of Ribičič's work, written in the fin-de-siècle estheticism, is children literature. His book Nicholas's Night (Slovene: Miklavževa noč), illustrated by Milko Bambič, is the first Slovene-language youth book printed in colour lithography. An example of adult literature is the book Ruins (Slovene: Razvaline), published in 1917, which is a collection of short stories and humoresques dealing with World War I. In 1976, the publishing house Mladinska knjiga published his collected works in 7 volumes.
