= Zapotok, Kanal =

Zapotok
- Location in Slovenia
- Coordinates: 46°4′6.25″N 13°34′10.18″E
- Country: Slovenia
- Traditional region: Littoral
- Statistical region: Gorizia
- Municipality: Kanal ob Soči

Area
  - Total: 8.31 km^{2} (3.21 sq mi)
- Elevation: 506.8 m (1,663 ft)

Population (2002)
  - Total: 9

Zapotok (pronounced [ˈzaːpɔtɔk]) is a small dispersed settlement in the hills west of Anhovo in the Municipality of Kanal ob Soči in the Littoral region of Slovenia, close to the border with Italy.

The local church is dedicated to Saint Gabriel and belongs to the Parish of Marijino Celje. A second church belonging to the same parish on Korada Hill (811 m) above the settlement is dedicated to Saint Gertrude (Genderca in the local dialect).
