= Deskle =

- Location in Slovenia
- Coordinates: 46°3′12.32″N 13°36′48.46″E
- Country: Slovenia
- Traditional region: Littoral
- Statistical region: Gorizia
- Municipality: Kanal ob Soči

Area
  - Total: 11.6 km^{2} (4.5 sq mi)
- Elevation: 91.7 m (301 ft)

Population (2002)
  - Total: 1,324

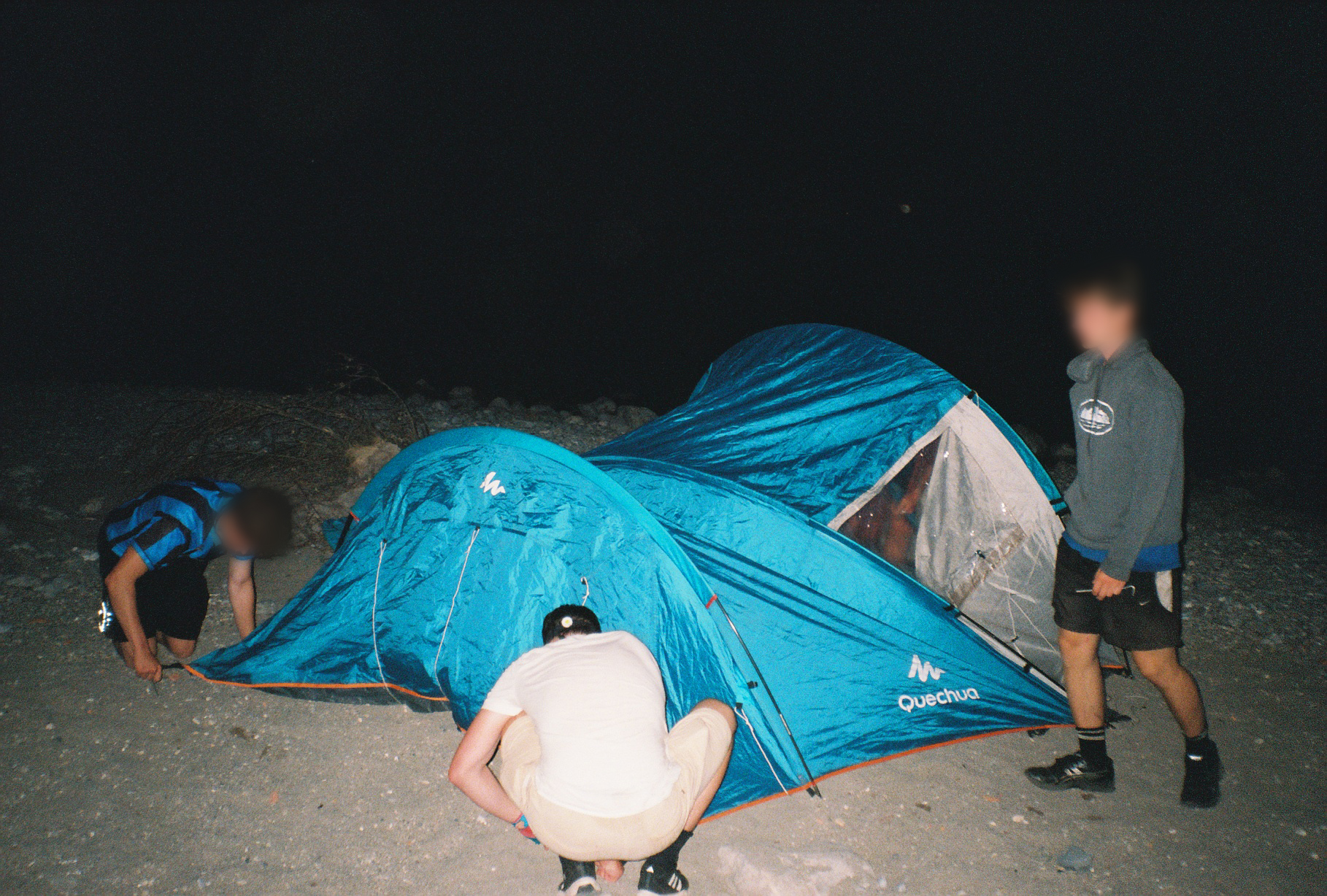
Vagrants sleeping on the Deskle swimming area's beach

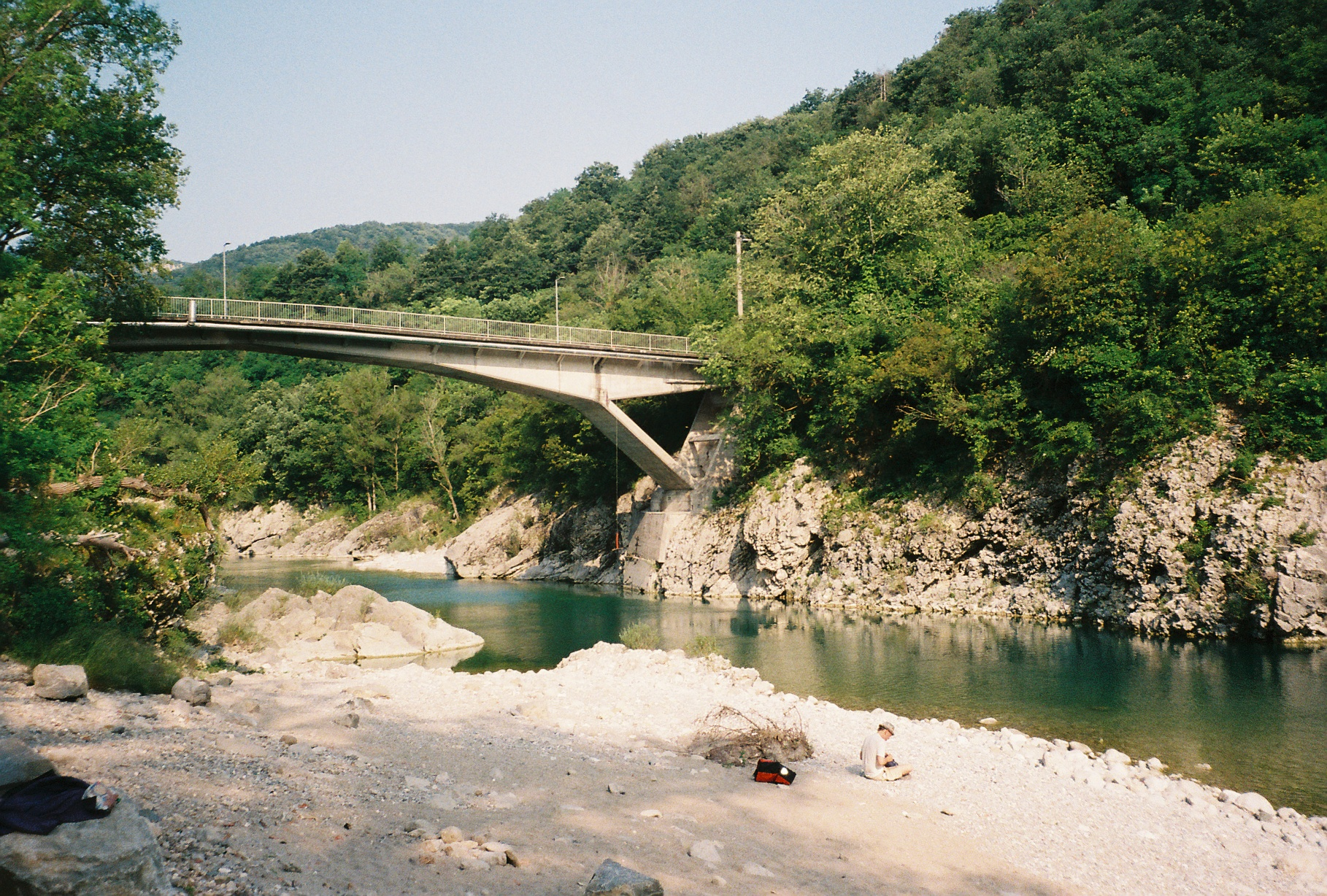
Deskle bridge and rope swing

Deskle (pronounced [ˈdeːsklɛ]; Italian: Descla) is a settlement on the left bank of the Soča River, opposite Anhovo, in the Municipality of Kanal ob Soči in the Littoral region of Slovenia.

The parish church in the settlement is dedicated to Saint George and belongs to the Diocese of Koper.
