= Levpa =

- Location in Slovenia
- Coordinates: 46°5′30.22″N 13°42′12.77″E
- Country: Slovenia
- Traditional region: Littoral
- Statistical region: Gorizia
- Municipality: Kanal ob Soči

Area
  - Total: 6.43 km^{2} (2.48 sq mi)
- Elevation: 460 m (1,510 ft)

Population (2002)
  - Total: 194

Levpa (pronounced [ˈleːu̯pa]) is a dispersed settlement in the hills to the east of Kanal in the Littoral region of Slovenia. It lies on the northwest part of the Banjšice Plateau and is made up of several smaller settlements: Bizjaki, Dolenja Levpa, Gorenja Levpa, Hoje, Mešnjak, Košenija, Robi, Sukavec, Testeni, and Zavrh.

The parish church in the settlement is dedicated to Saint Stephen and belongs to the Diocese of Koper.
