= Kal nad Kanalom =

- Location in Slovenia
- Coordinates: 46°5′7.5″N 13°44′33.42″E
- Country: Slovenia
- Traditional region: Littoral
- Statistical region: Gorizia
- Municipality: Kanal ob Soči

Area
  - Total: 20.38 km^{2} (7.87 sq mi)
- Elevation: 698.6 m (2,292 ft)

Population (2002)
  - Total: 318

Kal nad Kanalom (pronounced [ˈkaːu̯ nat kaˈnaːlɔm]; Italian: Cal di Canale) is a village in the hills east of Kanal in the Littoral region of Slovenia. It lies on the southwest part of the Banjšice Plateau.

== Name ==
The name of the settlement was changed from Kal to Kal nad Kanalom in 1952.

== Church ==
The parish church in the settlement is dedicated to Saint George and belongs to the Diocese of Koper. A second church belonging to this parish is built on a hill above the hamlet of Koprivišče and is dedicated to Saint Thomas.
