= Robidni Breg =

- Location in Slovenia
- Coordinates: 46°3′37.24″N 13°37′3.08″E
- Country: Slovenia
- Traditional region: Slovenian Littoral
- Statistical region: Gorizia
- Municipality: Kanal ob Soči

Area
  - Total: 0.2 km^{2} (0.077 sq mi)

Population (2023)
  - Total: 42

Robidni Breg (pronounced [ɾɔˈbiːdni ˈbɾeːk]) is a small settlement in the Municipality of Kanal ob Soči in western Slovenia. Until 2007, the area was part of the settlement of Anhovo. The settlement is part of the traditional region of the Slovenian Littoral and is included in the Gorizia Statistical Region.

== Cultural heritage ==
The Švink Mill (Slovene: Švinkov mlin) is located in the northern part of Robidni Breg and is registered as cultural heritage. It is a simple one-room structure with a water-driven mechanism dating from the second half of the 19th century. The mill stands in a ravine along Perivnik Creek.
