= Anhovo railway station =

Railway station in Anhovo, Slovenia

Anhovo
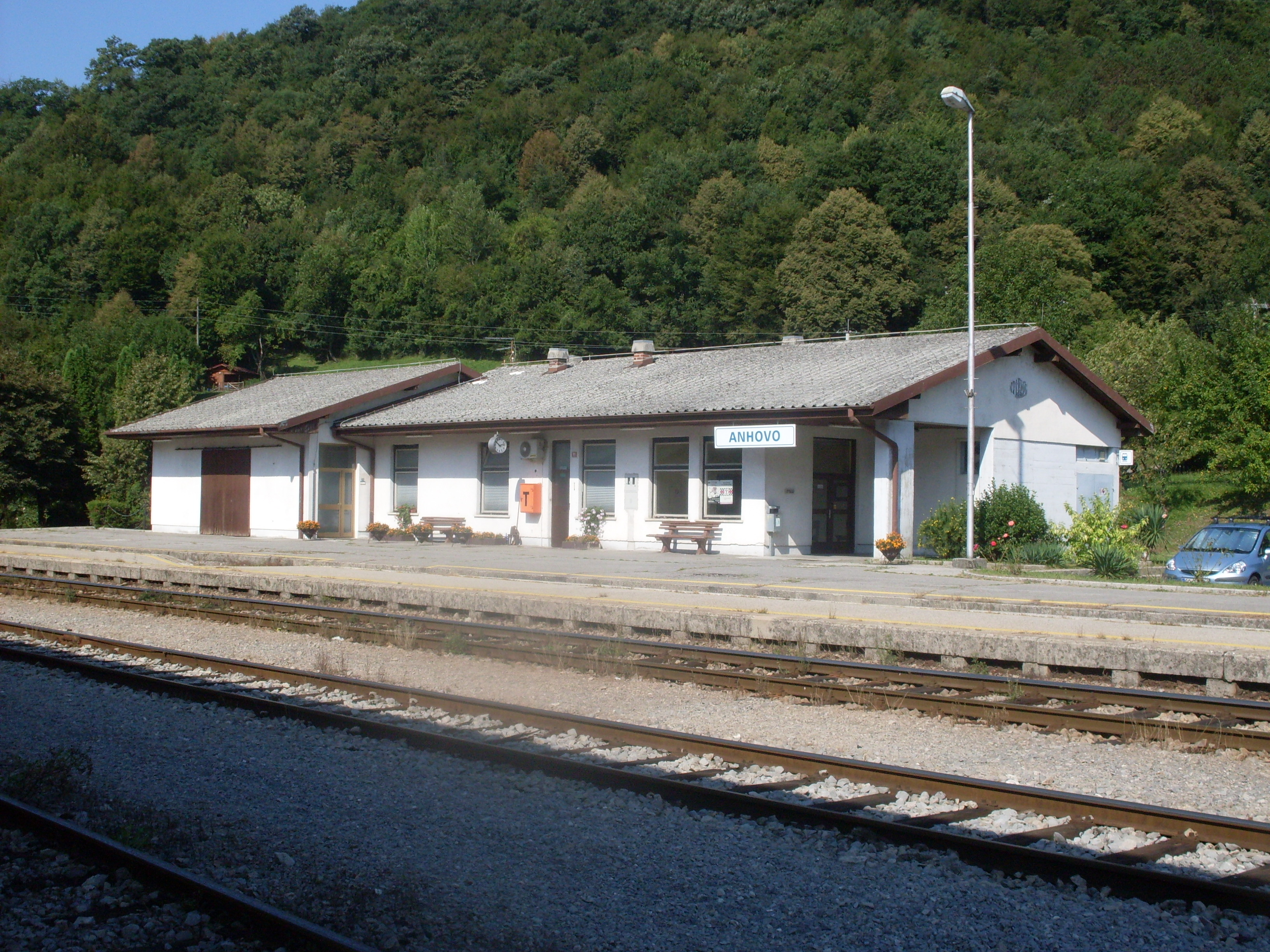

General information
- Location: 5255 Deskle; Kanal ob Soči; Slovenia
- Coordinates: 46°03′30″N 13°37′02″E
- Owner: Slovenian Railways
- Operator: Slovenian Railways
Location
- Location within Slovenia

Anhovo railway station (Slovene: Železniška postaja Anhovo) is the principal railway station in Anhovo, Slovenia.
