= Morsko, Kanal =

Morsko
- Location in Slovenia
- Coordinates: 46°4′33.22″N 13°38′2.77″E
- Country: Slovenia
- Traditional region: Littoral
- Statistical region: Gorizia
- Municipality: Kanal ob Soči

Area
  - Total: 3.47 km^{2} (1.34 sq mi)
- Elevation: 147.7 m (485 ft)

Population (2002)
  - Total: 201

Morsko (pronounced [mɔɾˈskoː]) is a settlement on the left bank of the Soča River, south of Kanal in the Littoral region of Slovenia.

== Cultural heritage ==
There is a cemetery chapel in the settlement, dedicated to Saint Anne. It was first mentioned in documents dating to 1542. It is a Gothic chapel with a vaulted chancel, a bell gable and a porch.

== Events ==
Morsko is known for its annual spring Morsko carnival (Morščanski pust). Many locals wear original masks hand-crafted by the painter, sculptor, and cartoonist Branko Drekonja. The costumes reflect political or other events of interest that took place that year. The villagers then take part in a traditional carnival procession that visits each village household and holds a public performance in the village square, known as na Gorici. This performance attracts many spectators and is one of the main tourist attractions in the Municipality of Kanal ob Soči.

Another annual event is a volleyball championship on the last weekend in August.
