= Dávid Szabó =

Hungarian volleyball player (born 1990)

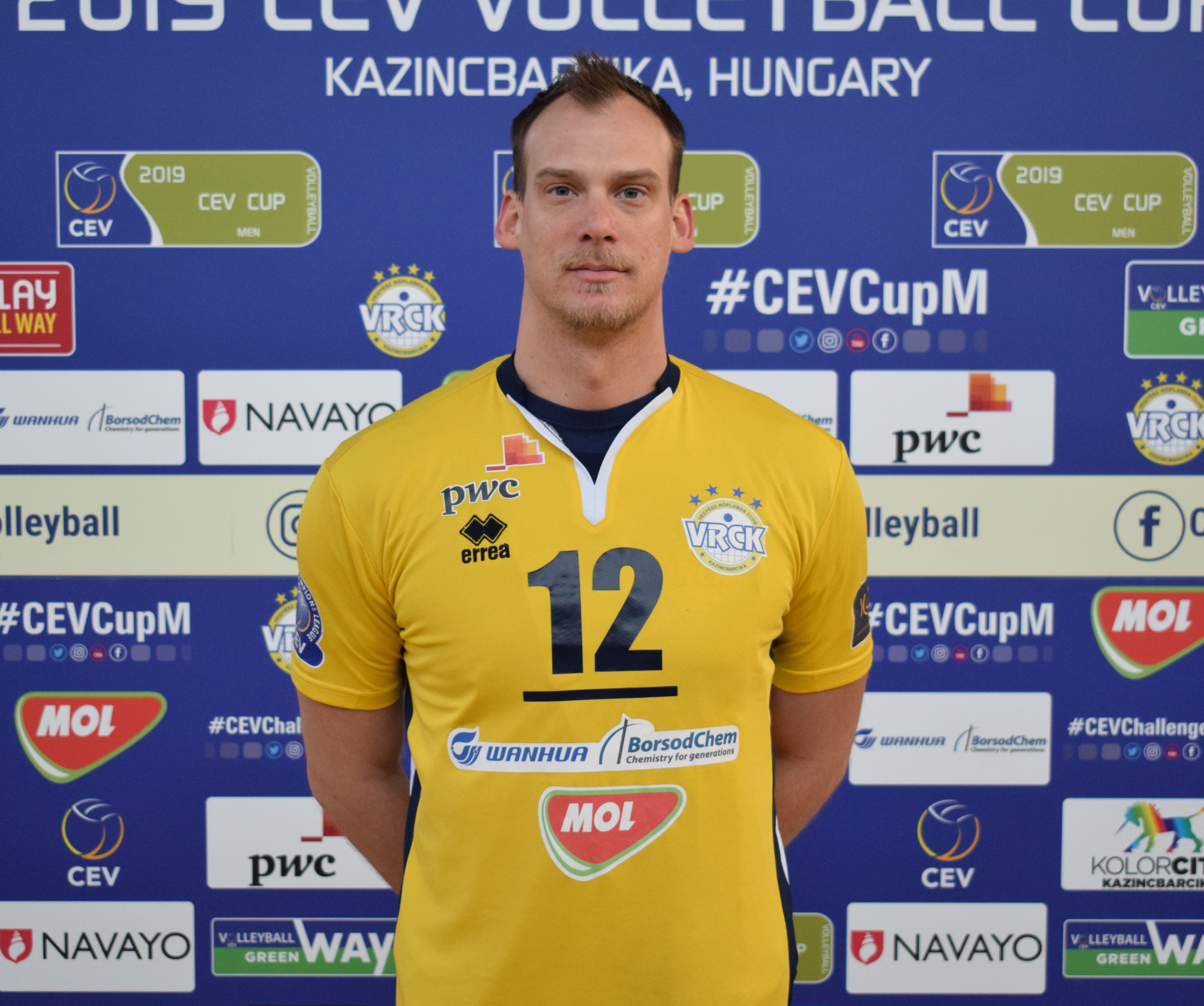

Personal information
- Nationality: Hungarian
- Born: Szabó Dávid; 13 January 1990 (age 36); Kazincbarcika, Hungary
- Height: 2.02 m (6 ft 8 in)
- Weight: 97 kg (214 lb)

Volleyball information
- Position: Opposite hitter
- Current club: (South Korea) Seoul Woori Card Hansae

Career
Years	Teams
2005–2007; 2007–2008; 2008–2009; 2009–2010; 2010–2012; 2012–2013; 2013–2014; 2015–	(Hungary) VRC Kazincbarcika (Italy) Top Team Mantova (Italy) Blu Volley Verona (Slovenia) OK Salonit Anhovo (Italy) Sisley Volley (Austria) Tirol Innsbruck (Italy) Trentino Volley (South Korea) Seoul Woori Card Hansae

National team
2008–	Hungary

Dávid Szabó (born 13 January 1990) is a Hungarian volleyball player. Szabo was the last member of Sisley Volley, the most titled club in Italian volleyball history, where he played from 2010 to 2012. Szabo moved to Austrian club Tirol Innsbruck in 2012 when Sisley Treviso went bankrupt and placed in the fourth level Serie B2. After playing the 2013–14 season for Trentino Volley in Italian Serie A1, Szabo played for Woori Card Hansae in South Korean V-League in 2015.
