= Kambreško =

- Location in Slovenia
- Coordinates: 46°7′40.38″N 13°38′51.72″E
- Country: Slovenia
- Traditional region: Littoral
- Statistical region: Gorizia
- Municipality: Kanal ob Soči

Area
  - Total: 15.45 km^{2} (5.97 sq mi)
- Elevation: 541 m (1,775 ft)

Population (2002)
  - Total: 137

Kambreško (pronounced [kamˈbɾeːʃkɔ]) is a settlement in the hills above the right bank of the Soča River in the Municipality of Kanal ob Soči in the Littoral region of Slovenia, next to the border with Italy.

The local church in the hamlet of Srednje, which is part of Kambreško, is dedicated to the Holy Trinity and belongs to the parish of Ročinj.
