= Dolenje Nekovo =

- Location in Slovenia
- Coordinates: 46°6′3.87″N 13°38′3.06″E
- Country: Slovenia
- Traditional region: Slovenian Littoral
- Statistical region: Gorizia
- Municipality: Kanal ob Soči

Area
  - Total: 0.6 km^{2} (0.23 sq mi)

Population (2013)
  - Total: 0

Dolenje Nekovo (pronounced [dɔˈleːnjɛ ˈneːkɔʋɔ]) is a small uninhabited settlement in the Municipality of Kanal ob Soči in western Slovenia. Until 2008, the area was part of the settlement of Ajba. The settlement is part of the traditional region of the Slovenian Littoral and is included in the Gorizia Statistical Region.
