= Seniški Breg =

- Location in Slovenia
- Coordinates: 46°6′15.8″N 13°41′35.38″E
- Country: Slovenia
- Traditional region: Littoral
- Statistical region: Gorizia
- Municipality: Kanal ob Soči

Area
  - Total: 3.59 km^{2} (1.39 sq mi)
- Elevation: 357 m (1,171 ft)

Population (2002)
  - Total: 137

Seniški Breg (pronounced [sɛˈniːʃki ˈbɾeːk]) is a dispersed settlement in the hills above Avče in the Municipality of Kanal ob Soči in the Littoral region of Slovenia.
