= Gorenje Polje, Kanal =

Gorenje Polje
- Location in Slovenia
- Coordinates: 46°3′51.32″N 13°37′26.11″E
- Country: Slovenia
- Traditional region: Slovenian Littoral
- Statistical region: Gorizia
- Municipality: Kanal ob Soči

Area
  - Total: 0.5 km^{2} (0.19 sq mi)

Population (2013)
  - Total: 89
  - Density: 175/km^{2} (450/sq mi)

Gorenje Polje (pronounced [ɡɔˈɾeːnjɛ ˈpoːljɛ]) is a small settlement in the Municipality of Kanal ob Soči in western Slovenia. From 1952 to 2008, the village was part of the settlement of Anhovo. The settlement is part of the traditional region of the Slovenian Littoral and is included in the Gorizia Statistical Region.

The parish church in the settlement is dedicated to Saint Michael. It belongs to the Diocese of Koper.
