= Guido Novak von Arienti =

Austro-Hungarian Officer

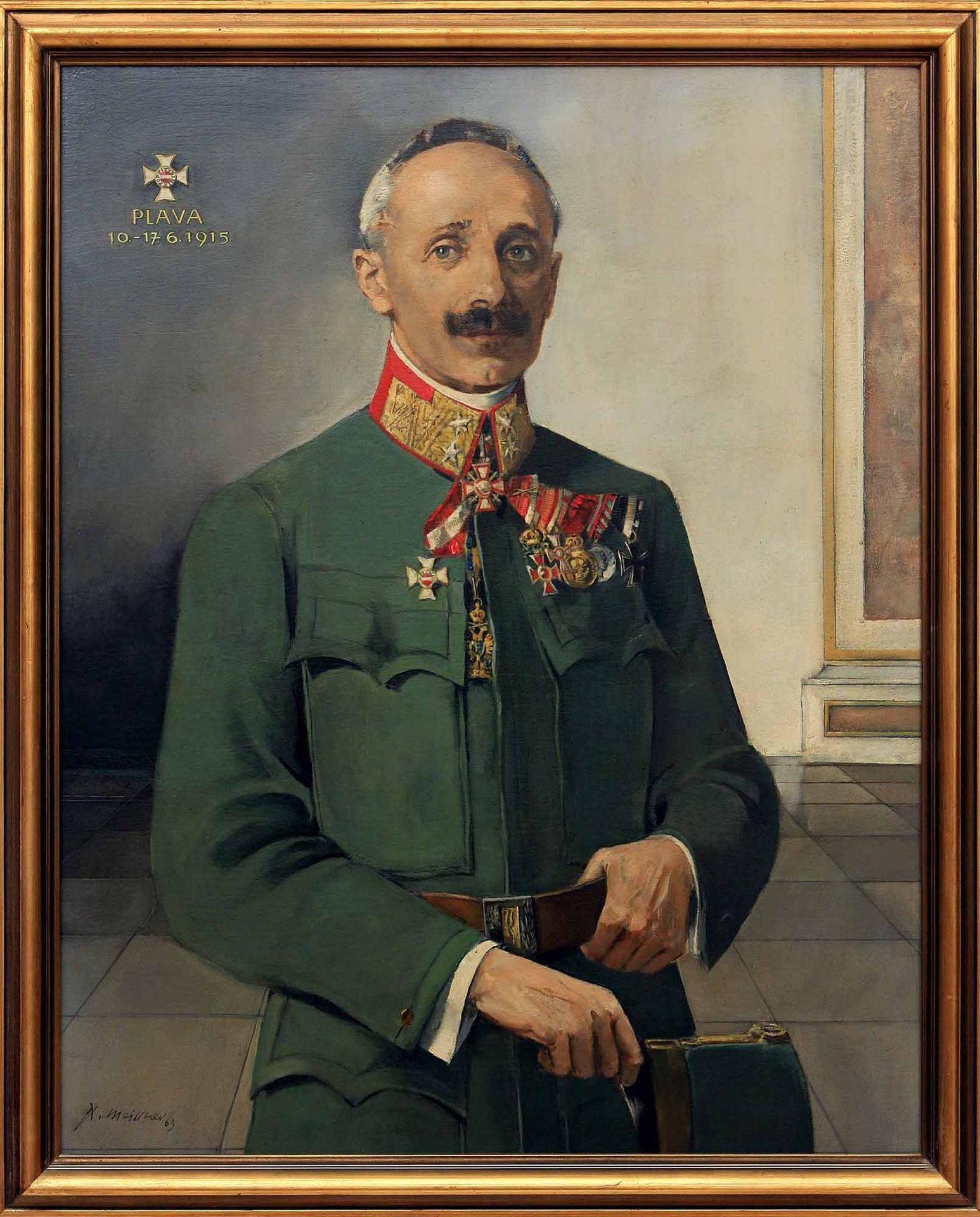
- 1917 portrait
- Born: 21 January 1859; Milan
- Died: 15 August 1928 (aged 69) Vienna
- Allegiance: Austria-Hungary
- Branch: Austro-Hungarian Army
- Service years: 1878-1918
- Rank: Feldmarschallleutnant
- Commands: 1st Mountain Brigade
- Conflicts: World War I: Serbian campaign; Italian front; Battle of Hill 383

Guido Novak von Arienti (21 January 1859 - 15 August 1928) was an Austrian officer who served in the Austro-Hungarian army in the First World War.

== Early life ==
Novak was born in Milan as the son of an Austrian naval officer. He graduated from the Infantry Cadet School at Karthaus near Brno and entered military service as a cadet in Infantry Regiment Holstein Number 80 on 1 September 1878 . In 1910, after nearly 30 years of military service, he was elevated to nobility and took the surname 'von Arienti'.

== World War 1 ==
Directly after the war began, Novak was promoted to Major General. He commanded the 1st Mountain Brigade during the Serbian campaign, during which he was wounded in the head. While he recovered, the 1st Mountain Brigade was commanded by Geza Lukachich. Novak resumed command on 25 January 1915.

The XVI Corps, of which Novak's brigade was a part, was sent to the Isonzo front in May 1915 to defend against Italian forces. Novak's 1st Mountain Brigade was tasked with holding the vitally important Hill 383, which they did against numerically-heavy, though poorly planned and organized, Italian attacks. Novak was again wounded in August 1915, recovering by November—when he was appointed commander of the 50th Infantry Division, followed by the 62nd Infantry Division, and then a temporary command of the XVII Corps. For leading the defense of Hill 383, Novak was awarded the Knight's Cross of the Order of Maria Theresa, the highest Habsburg military decoration. This was the first of these crosses to be awarded on the Italian front. The award was given on 17 August 1917 alongside an elevation to Freiherr. Novak was promoted to Lieutenant field marshal (German: Feldmarschalleutnant) on 22 August 1917, after which he was appointed to lead Military Academy at Wiener Neustadt. He remained at the academy until the war's end.

== Later life and death ==
Novak retired from military service after the war and died in Vienna on 15 August 1928. He was buried in the Heitzing cemetery in Vienna.
