= Ignazio Francesco Scodnik =

Francesco Ignazio Scodnik born in Kanal (Italian: Canale d’Isonzo, German: Kanalburg) on 23 July 1804, died in Milan on 7 November 1877, was an Italian and Austrian Army Officer.

== Early life ==
Francesco Ignazio Scodnik or -Franc Ignacij Škodnik in Slovenian - was born into a Gorizian – Lombard family in the present day Kanal ob Soci now Slovenjia. He lost his father in infancy, and was raised by his eldest brother Pietro, in Segna, now Senj in Croatia who was a Military Auditor.

== Military career on Austrian service ==
At the beginning of 1821 Scodnik was assigned to the cadet company with the 23 Infantry Regiment “Feldmarschall-Lieutenant Graf Ceccopieri” in Cremona, Italy, where his brother Giuseppe was also serving. A year later he was at the Cadet School of Buda in Hungary for a three-year cadet course. The lack of wars was an unfavorable condition for promotion and he was made Ensign in 1830; in 1832 he was promoted Second Lieutenant and in 1835 Lieutenant; temporary Captain in 1845, and become substantive Captain in 1847. At the beginning of 1848, he was considered for the rank, Major, after having been acting Regimental Major in few garrisons.

== Military career on Italian service ==
Until 1844, Scodnik was not interested in politics. He, like many of his contemporaneous Officers on Austrian service, was just dedicated to his career. It appears that during his assignment in Cremona, where his mother was living, and where she also died in June 1844, he started reading about Italian history, and become involved in politics. The early 40s where peaceful years, but it was just the calm before the storm, that would erupt in 1848 in the whole Europe. Possibly the nationalism that will destroy Austria 70 years later begun in those years, and Scodnik, whose mother was probably Italian, started seeing the Austrian army as an oppressor of the Italian liberty, rather than the legitimate army of his country. He was partly from Lombard – Italian descend and had many relatives living in the Austrian Lombardy, and that might have played a part in his conversion to the Italian cause. On 19 March 1848, almost simultaneously with the popular uprisings of 1848 in the Kingdom of Lombardy–Venetia, the city of Milan also rose. Cremona was not far from Milan and the news spread out. The whole city was soon draped with Italian national flag, and many Austrian soldiers of Italian ancestry, soon fraternized with the locals. The situations quickly escalated and the Austrian commanding Officer, General Schonhals, signed an agreement with the provisional government, and three battalions composed by Italians, went under the provisional Government control, while the other Austrian would left the city undisturbed. The provisional government offered to Scodnik who was the oldest captain, the command of the three battalions and the rank of Major. He broke the indulges and accepted the proposal, thus crossing into the Italian side. On 23 March 1848 in Cremona he formed the group of “Lombard Legion”. On 7 April 1848 with a force of 3500 men he arrived in Milan. His forces were merged into the 1 Line Infantry Lombard Regiment. On 17 June 1848 Scodnik was promoted to Lieutenant colonel, and took part at the engagement of Zelo Buon Persico, where he was wounded. He earned the appraisal of his commanding Officer and former Napoleons cavalry officer, Colonel Giacomo Sessa. After the First Italian War of Independence, Scodnik entered into the Royal Piedmont Army, with the rank of Lieutenant Colonel. He retired on 24 September 1868 as a Major General.

== Personal life ==
In June 1844, his mother died in Cremona while he was stationed there, and on 4 October 1844 he married Maria Miller in Buda (Hungary). Their marriage produced three children, two daughters, Melania a writer, Irene who later married another prominent Italian irredentist and red skirts Officer, Matteo Renato Imbriani, and a son, Enrico.

== Death ==
Francesco Ignazio Scodnik died on 7 October 1877. He is interred in Milan. The city of Gorizia has a street named after him.

== Sources ==
- Thompson Lancillotto, “Il Risorgimento italiano e gli Irridenti Milano”, Ravà & C., 1915;
- Va pensiero. “Romanzo storico degl’irredenti” (1847–1849). Milano, Casa Editrice Ceschina, 1938;
- Ranieri Mario Cossar: Volontari Goriziani nella Guerra d’indipendenza 1848–1849.
