= Municipality of Kanal ob Soči =

Municipality of Slovenia

Municipality of Kanal ob Soči Občina Kanal ob Soči
- Municipality
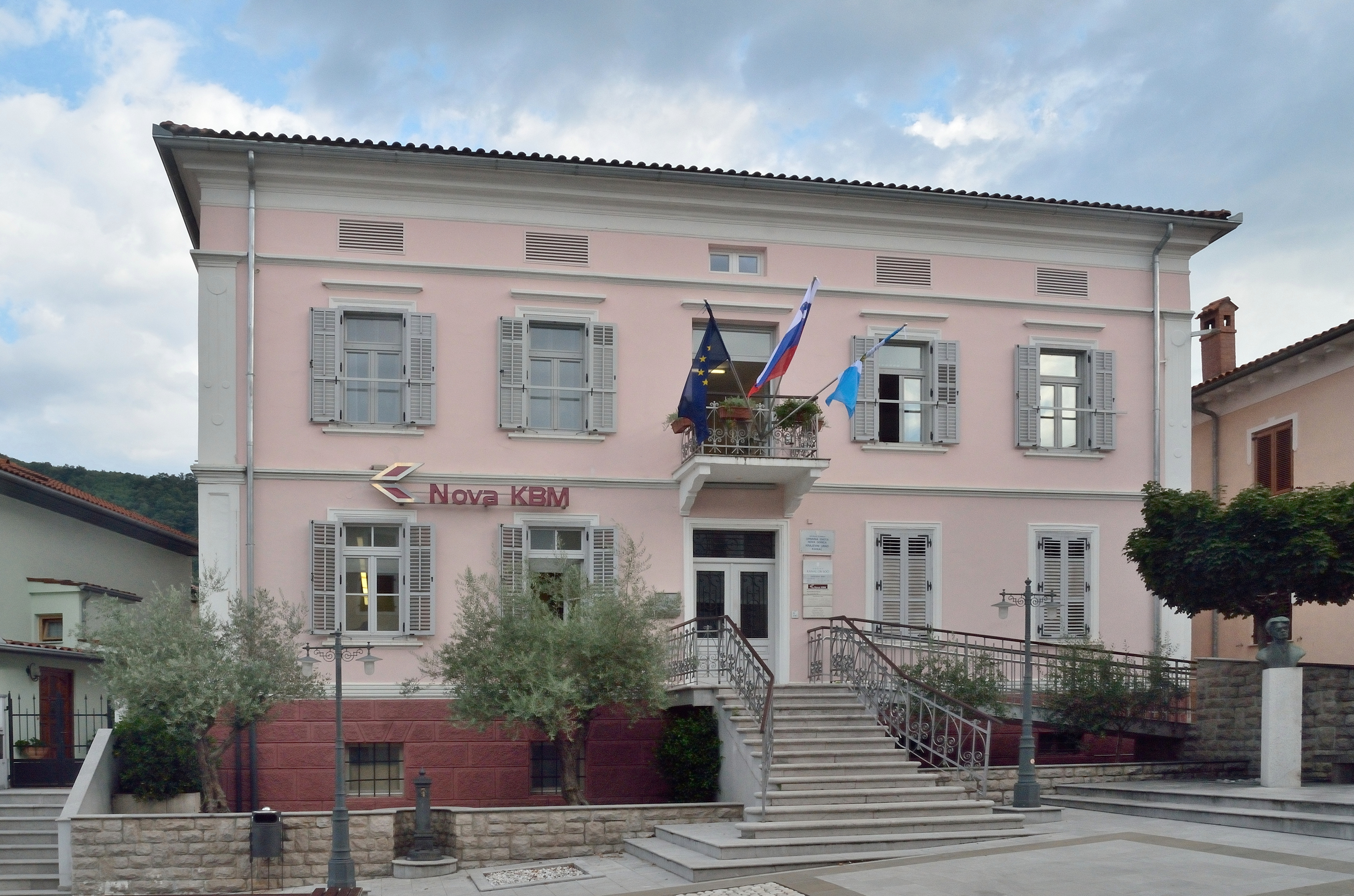
- Town hall

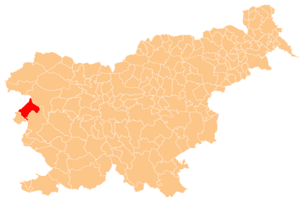
- Location of the Municipality of Kanal ob Soči in Slovenia
- Coordinates: 46°05′N 13°38′E
- Country: Slovenia

Government
  - Mayor: Miha Stegel (Independent)

Area
  - Total: 146.5 km^{2} (56.6 sq mi)

Population (2016)
  - Total: 5,386
  - Density: 36.76/km^{2} (95.22/sq mi)
- Time zone: UTC+01 (CET)
  - Summer (DST): UTC+02 (CEST)
- Website: www.obcina-kanal.si

The Municipality of Kanal ob Soči (pronounced [kaˈnaːl ɔp ˈsoːtʃi] or [kaˈnaːu̯ ɔp ˈsoːtʃi]; Slovene: Občina Kanal ob Soči) is a municipality in the traditional region of the Littoral in western Slovenia. The seat of the municipality is the town of Kanal. Kanal ob Soči became a municipality in 1994. It borders Italy.

== Settlements ==
In addition to the municipal seat of Kanal, the municipality also includes the following settlements:

- Ajba
- Anhovo
- Avče
- Bodrež
- Čolnica
- Deskle
- Doblar
- Dolenje Nekovo
- Goljevica
- Gorenja Vas
- Gorenje Nekovo
- Gorenje Polje
- Jesen
- Kal nad Kanalom
- Kambreško
- Kamenca nad Ložicami
- Kanalski Vrh
- Krstenica
- Levpa
- Lig
- Ložice
- Močila
- Morsko
- Paljevo
- Plave
- Prilesje pri Plavah
- Ravna
- Robidni Breg
- Ročinj
- Seniški Breg
- Ukanje
- Zagomila
- Zagora
- Zapotok
