= Anka Makovec =

Slovene-Australian painter (1938–2017)

- Born: 3 August 1938; Ročinj, Slovenia
- Died: 16 February 2017 (aged 78); Devonport, Tasmania, Australia

Anka Makovec (3 August 1938 – 16 February 2017) was a Slovene-Australian artist and environmental activist.

== Biography ==
Makovec was born on 3 August 1938 in Ročinj, Slovenia. She emigrated to Australia when she was 24. Makovec attended art classes and workshops in Tasmania and is best known for her watercolors.

== Environmental activism ==
During her time in Tasmania, Makovec lived with the Aboriginal Australians. In the 1980s, she became an environment activist and joined the United Tasmania Group in their opposition to hydroelectric power plants in the jungle. She was a member of the Tasmanian Wilderness Society at a time when that group was opposing the proposed Franklin Dam on the Gordon River in Tasmania, Australia. She was assaulted on the Strahan wharf in 1983 by pro-dam activists around the time the dam construction was halted.

Makovec was interviewed by Caroline Jones on her Radio National program, The Search for Meaning.

Makovec died on 16 February 2017 in Devonport, Tasmania, at the age of 78.

Makovec's environmental activism is the subject of the documentary "Anka Tasmanka".
