= Polje, Velika Kladuša =

Polje
- Village
- Location within Bosnia and Herzegovina
- Coordinates: 45.164931°N 15.829229°E
- Country: Bosnia and Herzegovina
- Entity: Federation of Bosnia and Herzegovina
- Canton: Una-Sana
- Municipality: Velika Kladuša

Area
  - Total: 2.37 sq mi (6.14 km^{2})

Population (2013)
  - Total: 1,472
  - Density: 621/sq mi (240/km^{2})
- Time zone: UTC+1 (CET)
  - Summer (DST): UTC+2 (CEST)

Polje is a village in the municipality of Velika Kladuša, Bosnia and Herzegovina.

== Demographics ==
According to the 2013 census, its population was 1,472.

Ethnicity in 2013
| Ethnicity | Number | Percentage |
|---|---|---|
| Bosniaks | 1,107 | 75.2% |
| Croats | 30 | 2.0% |
| Serbs | 5 | 0.3% |
| other/undeclared | 330 | 22.4% |
| Total | 1,472 | 100% |
