= Mount Kuk =

Mountain in Slovenia

Coordinates: 46°01′41″N 13°37′11″E

Kuk / Cucco
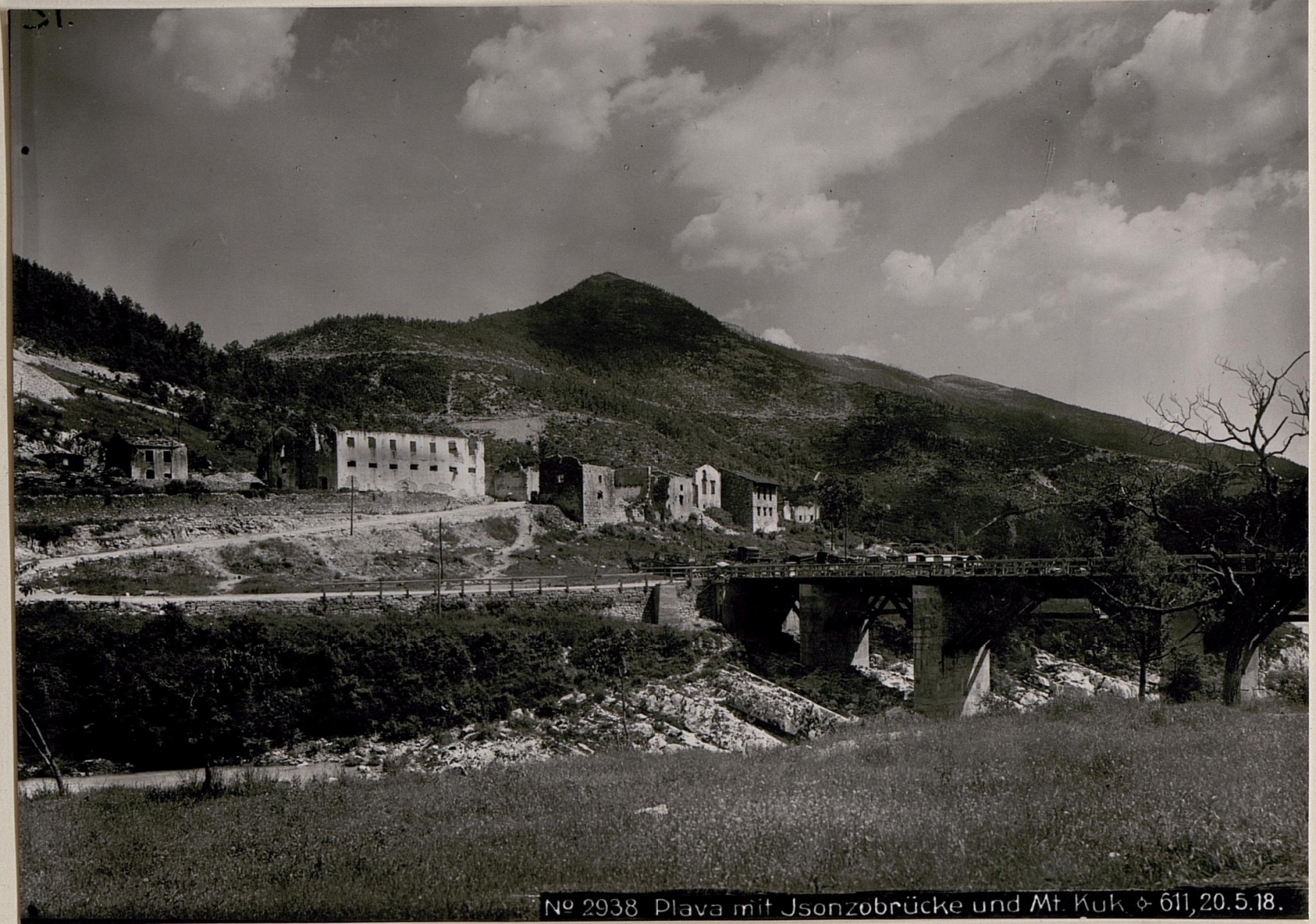
- Mount Kuk / Cucco and the ruins of Plave in May 1918

Highest point
- Elevation: 612 m (2,008 ft)

Geography
- Location: Slovenia
- Parent range: Alps

Mount Kuk (Italian: Monte Cucco or Monte Cucco di Plava) is 612-metre-high (2,008 ft) mountain in Slovenia, near the border with Italy. It is located northeast of Gorizia, near the village of Plave and on the southern edge of the Banjšice Plateau. Along with nearby Vodice and Sveta Gora it forms a mountain ridge along the course of the Isonzo. It was heavily contested by Italian and Austro-Hungarian troops during the battles of the Isonzo in World War I, and was located in Italy from 1918 to 1943.
