= Zagora, Kanal =

Zagora
- Location in Slovenia
- Coordinates: 46°1′47.78″N 13°36′10.59″E
- Country: Slovenia
- Traditional region: Slovenian Littoral
- Statistical region: Gorizia
- Municipality: Kanal ob Soči

Area
  - Total: 2.6 km^{2} (1.0 sq mi)

Population (2013)
  - Total: 524
  - Density: 200/km^{2} (520/sq mi)

Zagora (pronounced [zaˈɡɔːɾa]) is a small settlement in the Municipality of Kanal ob Soči in western Slovenia. Until 2007, the area was part of the settlement of Plave. The settlement is part of the traditional region of the Slovenian Littoral and is included in the Gorizia Statistical Region.
