= Polje, Kreševo =

Village in Central Bosnia

Polje
- Village
- Location within Bosnia and Herzegovina
- Coordinates: 43.8789634°N 18.0654619°E
- Country: Bosnia and Herzegovina
- Entity: Federation of Bosnia and Herzegovina
- Canton: Central Bosnia
- Municipality: Kreševo

Area
  - Total: 0.51 sq mi (1.33 km^{2})

Population (2013)
  - Total: 790
  - Density: 1,500/sq mi (590/km^{2})
- Time zone: UTC+1 (CET)
  - Summer (DST): UTC+2 (CEST)

Polje is a village in the municipality of Kreševo, Bosnia and Herzegovina.

== Demographics ==
According to the 2013 census, its population was 790.

Ethnicity in 2013
Ethnicity	Number	Percentage
Croats	770	97.5%
Bosniaks	7	0.9%
Serbs	5	0.6%
other/undeclared	8	1.0%
Total	790	100%
