= Ročinj =

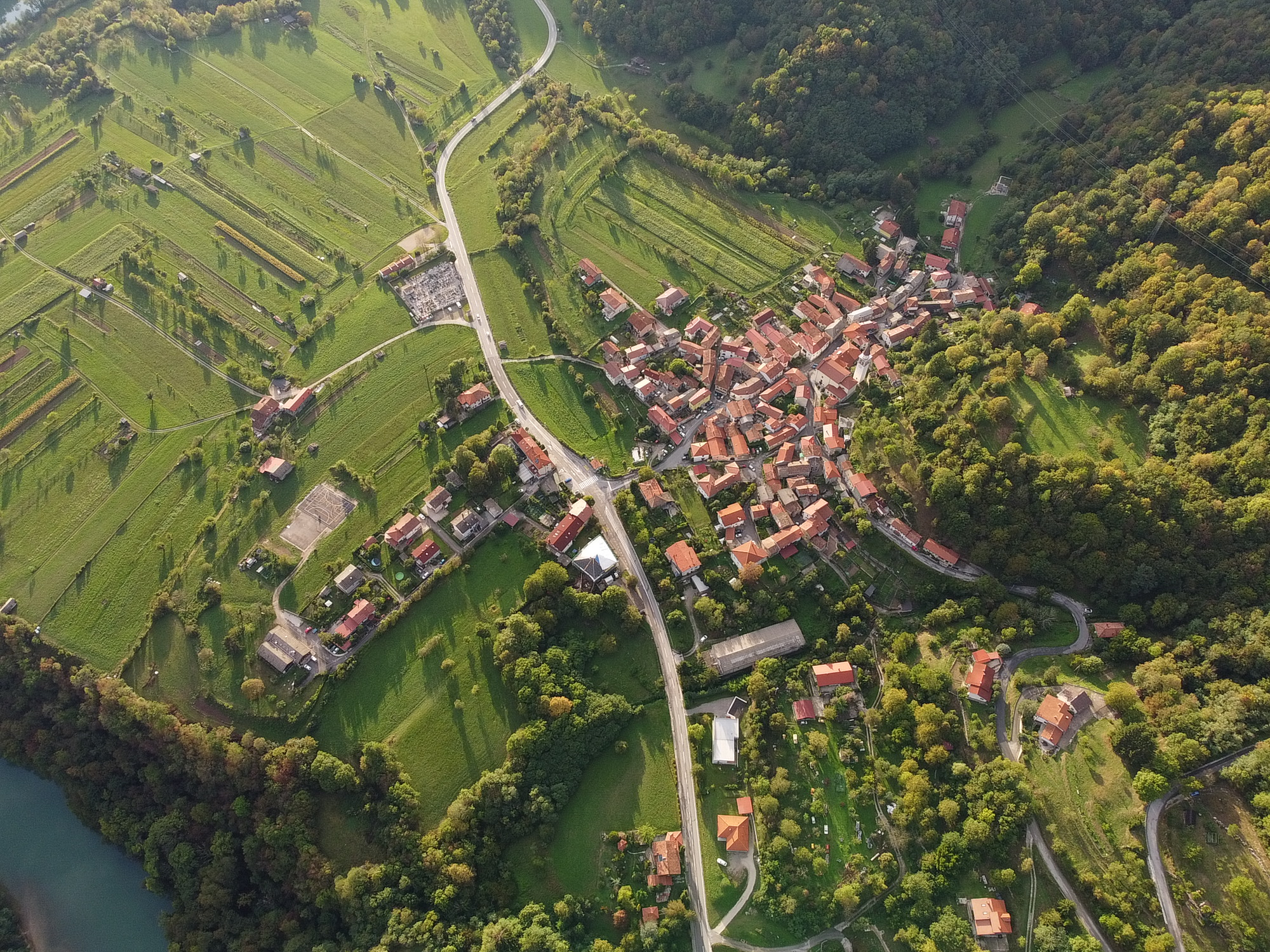

- Location in Slovenia
- Coordinates: 46°6′34.29″N 13°40′13.44″E
- Country: Slovenia
- Traditional region: Littoral
- Statistical region: Gorizia
- Municipality: Kanal ob Soči

Area
  - Total: 5.32 km^{2} (2.05 sq mi)
- Elevation: 195.6 m (642 ft)

Population (2002)
  - Total: 329

Ročinj (pronounced [ɾɔˈtʃiːn] or [ˈɾɔːtʃin]; Italian: Ronzina) is a village on the right bank of the Soča River in the Municipality of Kanal ob Soči in the Littoral region of Slovenia.

== Church ==
The parish church in the settlement is dedicated to Saint Andrew and belongs to the Diocese of Koper. A second church belonging to this parish is built on a hill above the settlement and is dedicated to Saint Paul.

== Notable people ==
Notable people that were born or lived in Ročinj include:

- Donat Jug (1879–1952), beekeeper
- Anka Makovec (1938–2017), Slovene-Australian artist and environmental activist
