= Ajba =

- Location in Slovenia
- Coordinates: 46°6′9.02″N 13°38′50.7″E
- Country: Slovenia
- Traditional region: Littoral
- Statistical region: Gorizia
- Municipality: Kanal ob Soči

Area
  - Total: 2.96 km^{2} (1.14 sq mi)
- Elevation: 166.1 m (545 ft)

Population (2002)
  - Total: 92

Ajba (pronounced [ˈaːi̯ba]) is a small village on the right bank of the Soča River in the Municipality of Kanal ob Soči in the Littoral region of Slovenia.

The local church is dedicated to Saint Peter. A second church, built in the Nekovo area above the main settlement, is dedicated to Saint Vitus. Both belong to the parish of Kanal.
