= Salonit Anhovo =

Cement factory in western Slovenia

- Company type: Joint-stock company
- Founded: 1921
- Founder: Emil Stock
- Headquarters: Anhovo, Slovenia
- Key people: Dragan Marinič, Jože Jaklin
- Products: Cement
- Website: www.salonit.si

Salonit Anhovo is a cement factory in the small village of Anhovo, Slovenia, about 20 kilometres north of Nova Gorica. Until 1996 it also produced asbestos. Salonit Anhovo is the biggest producer of cement in Slovenia.

== History ==
=== Early history ===
Salonit Anhovo dates back in the beginning of the 20th century, when construction worker Ivan Nibrant prepared limestone and discovered a grey dust with excellent binding properties. A jewish-Italian entrepreneur from Split, Croatia, Emilio Stock in 1919 discovered that it was an excellent source for making cement. He began constructing 16 vertical Dietzsche furnaces with a capacity of 160 tons of klinker a day. They called the factory Cementi Isonzo S.A. (Cement Factory of River Soča). It produced its first cement on May 2, 1921.

=== After WW2 ===
The first major modernisation happened in 1961, when the old furnaces were replaced with rotary kiln with a capacity of 350 tons of klinker per day. Cement from Anhovo soon became the best quality cement in Yugoslavia. In 1977 after four years of hard work, a new factory was built with a capacity of 2,000 tons of klinker per day. Despite this, it was only in 1986 that the company produced over 1 million ton of cement per year.

=== 1990s ===
The company introduced new technologies and reduced environmental footprint. In 1996 asbestos production was finally shut down and the company started a cleaning process. The plant uses used car tires and coal with a high sulphur content, which is absorbed into the klinker, so there are no significant emissions into the environment.

=== 21st century ===
In January 2005, Salonit Anhovo became the majority owner (54.93% ownership share) of the construction materials manufacturer Kema Puconci.

In August 2014, the Italian company Buzzi Unicem (which produces cement and other building materials) entered the ownership of Salonita Anhovo with a 25% ownership share.

The company reorganized and invested in a new heat exchanger, which is one of the tallest buildings in Slovenia. The klinker line increased to a capacity of 3500 tons, which means over 4000 tons of cement per day. The demand for cement in the country decreased because four of the biggest construction companies of Slovenia SCT, Vegrad, Primorje and Kraški Zidar went bankrupt. According to the Civil Initiative Today, in 2022 Salonit Anhovo is expected to double the volume of waste co-incineration; This is supposed to cover 220 thousand tons of waste per year (or 600 tons of waste per day). Cementarna Trbovlje is second biggest cement factory with a capacity of 550,000 tons.

== Pollution and Impact on Environment and Health ==
As of 2020 Salonit was the main polluter of the central Sava region. Until the legal prohibition of asbestos in 1996, the company produced materials including asbestos, and was the biggest consumer of asbestos in the wider region. Between 1996 and 2016, inhabitants in the area surrounding the factory comprised a majority of cases of asbestosis, pleural effusion, mesothelioma in the country, as well as an increased rate of lung cancer. In 2020, the company produced cement burning tons of garbage for energy production. Physicians and environmental activists have criticized the fact that cement factories like Salonit have been allowed to produce more pollutants than waste incineration plants. Salonit Anhovo's CEO Julijan Fortunat has said they comply with government and EU regulations. The Slovenian Ministry of the Environment has stated that Salonit Anhovo's environmental performance was "better than that of most European cement factories" and Salonit Anhovo asked the Slovenian government for permission to burn a quarter more waste in the future, causing local protests.

In March 2024, the Slovenian parliament decided about stricter emission standards for co-incineration.

== Organisation ==
It is Austrian-owned.

== Sister companies ==
- ESAL
- INDE

== Sponsorships ==
Salonit Anhovo is the main sponsor of the volleyball club OK Salonit Anhovo.
