= Lig =

- Location in Slovenia
- Coordinates: 46°6′31.48″N 13°36′42.57″E
- Country: Slovenia
- Traditional region: Littoral
- Statistical region: Gorizia
- Municipality: Kanal ob Soči

Area
  - Total: 5.88 km^{2} (2.27 sq mi)
- Elevation: 458.7 m (1,505 ft)

Population (2002)
  - Total: 143

Lig (pronounced [ˈliːk]; Italian: Liga) is a dispersed settlement in the hills northwest of Kanal in the Littoral region of Slovenia. It lies on the border with Italy and is made up of the smaller settlements of Lig, Kostanjevica, and Strmec, as well as a few remote farmsteads in the Kanal Kolovrat range.

== Church ==
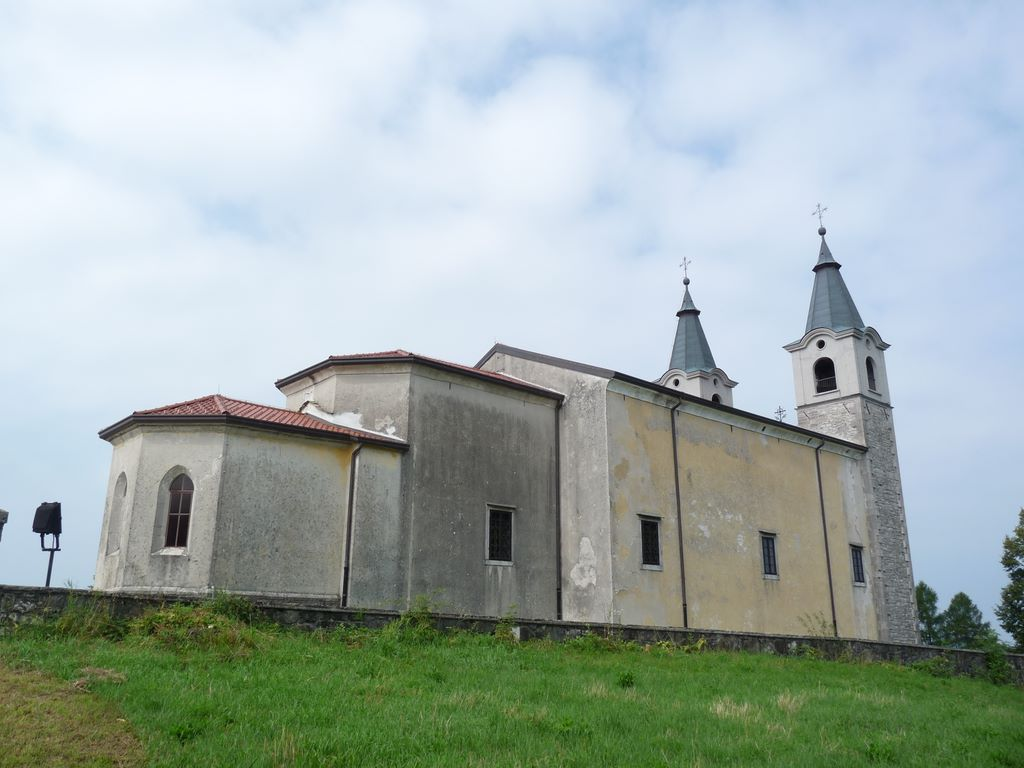
Marijino Celje, the parish church in Lig

The parish church in the area known as Marijino Celje is dedicated to Saint Zeno and The Holy Name of Mary. It is a popular pilgrimage church and belongs to the Diocese of Koper. A second church belonging to this parish is built in the Lig area and is dedicated to Saint Anthony of Padua.
