= Gorenja Vas, Kanal =

Gorenja Vas
- Location in Slovenia
- Coordinates: 46°5′5.6″N 13°37′8.91″E
- Country: Slovenia
- Traditional region: Littoral
- Statistical region: Gorizia
- Municipality: Kanal ob Soči

Area
  - Total: 3.17 km^{2} (1.22 sq mi)
- Elevation: 274.1 m (899 ft)

Population (2014)
  - Total: 148

Gorenja Vas (pronounced [ɡɔˈɾeːnja ˈʋaːs]) is a settlement on the right bank of the Soča River opposite Kanal in the Littoral region of Slovenia.
