= Plave, Kanal =

Plave
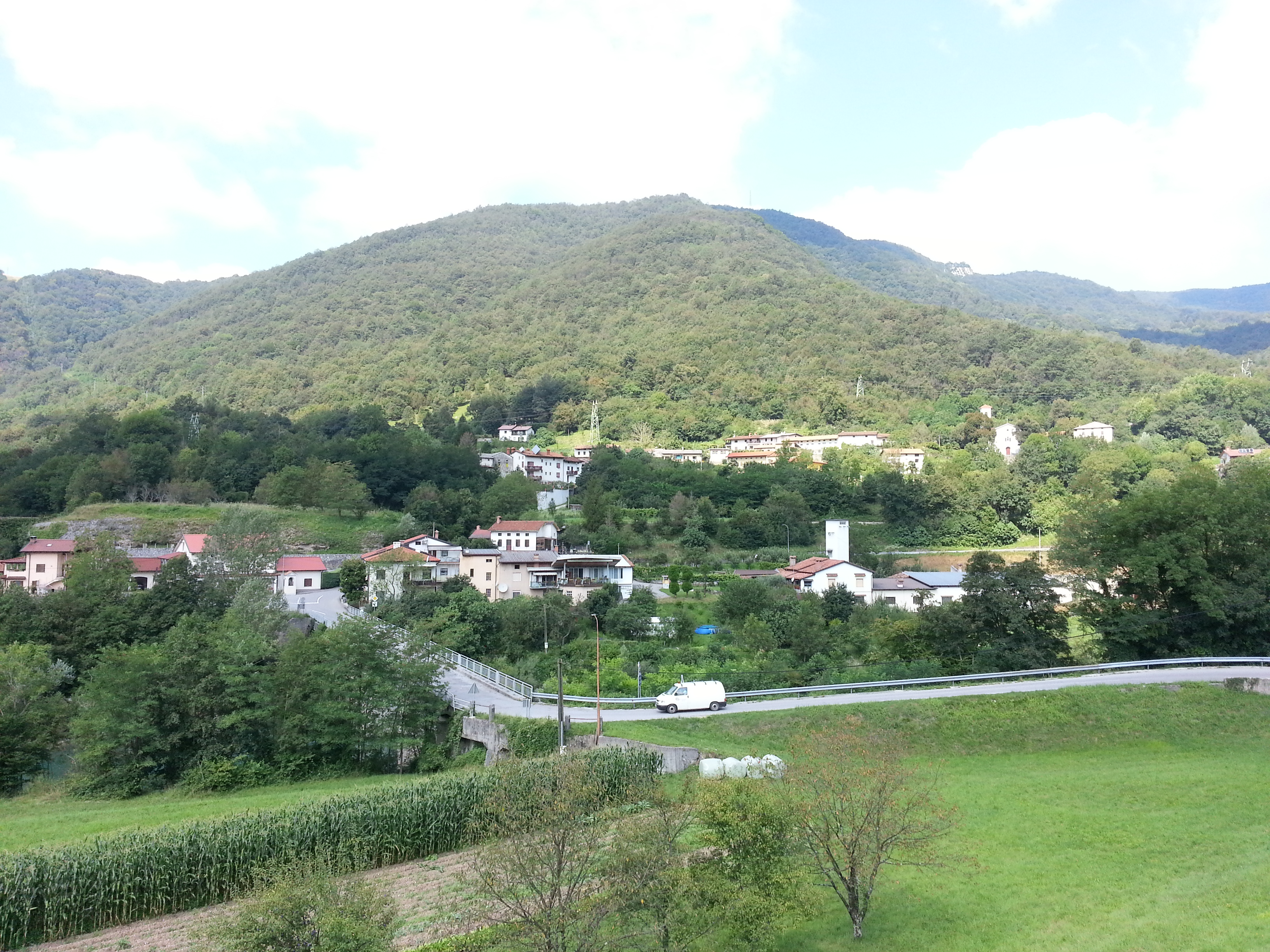

- Location in Slovenia
- Coordinates: 46°2′32″N 13°35′12″E
- Country: Slovenia
- Traditional region: Littoral
- Statistical region: Gorizia
- Municipality: Kanal ob Soči

Area
  - Total: 8.5 km^{2} (3.3 sq mi)
- Elevation: 191.4 m (628 ft)

Population (2002)
  - Total: 376

Plave (pronounced [ˈplaːʋɛ]; Italian: Plava) is a settlement on the right bank of the Soča River southwest of Anhovo in the Municipality of Kanal ob Soči in the Littoral region of Slovenia.

The parish church in the settlement is dedicated to John the Baptist and belongs to the Diocese of Koper.

A hill to the east of Plave (directly across the Soča), now called Prižnica, was the site of the Battle of Hill 383 from June 1915 to May 1917. The Italian and Austrian armies fought over control of the hill, with the Austrians controlling Prižnica until May 14, 1917.
