= Kanal, Kanal =

Kanal
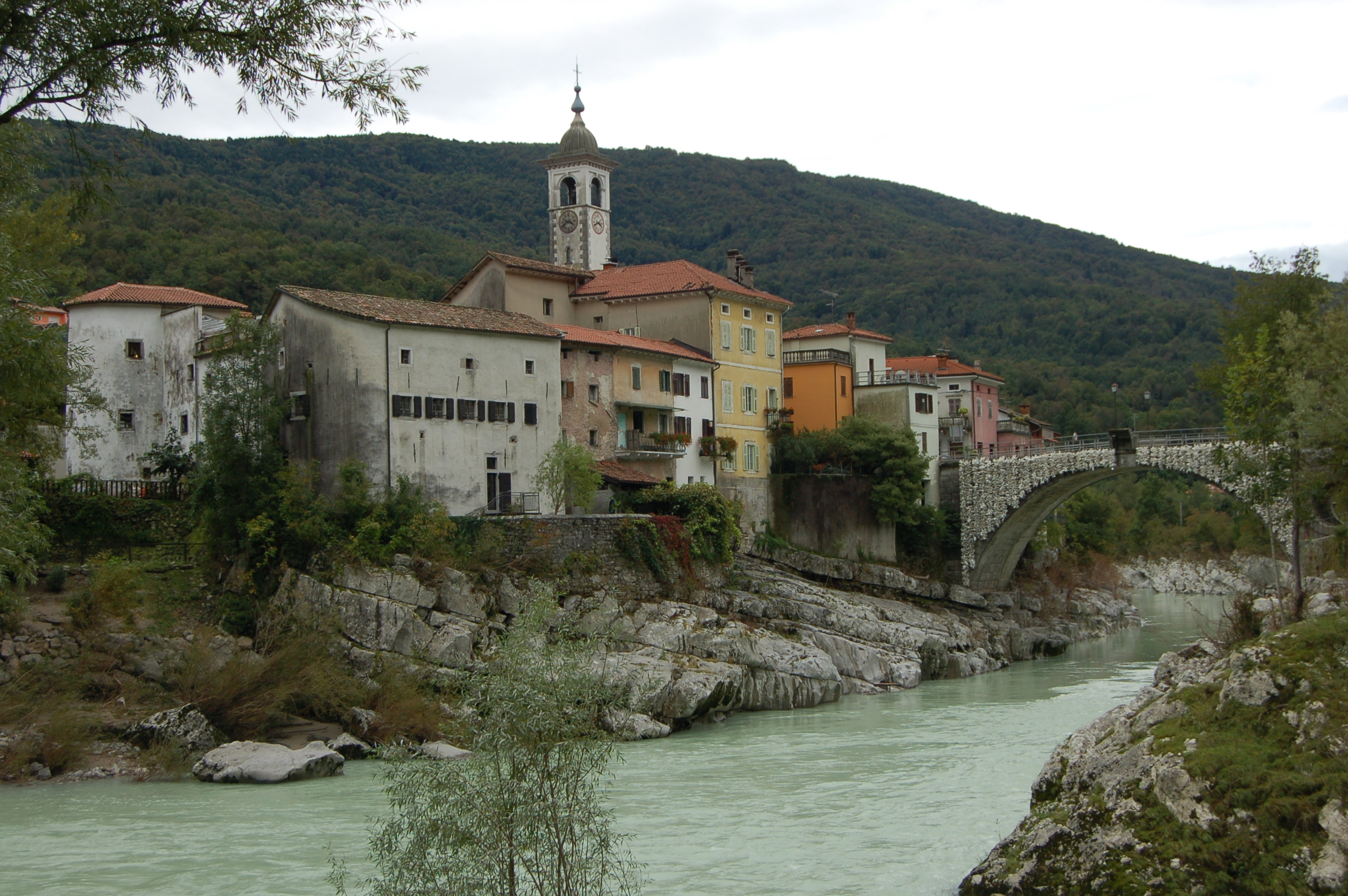

- Location in Slovenia
- Coordinates: 46°5′16.65″N 13°38′4.96″E
- Country: Slovenia
- Traditional region: Littoral
- Statistical region: Gorizia
- Municipality: Kanal ob Soči

Area
  - Total: 2.65 km^{2} (1.02 sq mi)
- Elevation: 106.2 m (348 ft)

Population (2019)
  - Total: 1,142

Kanal (pronounced [kaˈnaːl] or [kaˈnaːu̯]; Italian: Canale, German: Kanalburg), frequently referred to as Kanal ob Soči ("Kanal on the Soča"; pronounced [kaˈnaːl ɔp ˈsoːtʃi] or [kaˈnaːu̯ ɔp ˈsoːtʃi]; Italian: Canale d'Isonzo), is a settlement mostly on the left bank of the Soča River in the Slovene Littoral, the traditional region in southwestern Slovenia. It is the seat of the Municipality of Kanal ob Soči. It is an important crossing point over the Soča. At its eastern border, on the left bank of the Soča, runs the Bohinj Railway, the railway track linking the Central Europe and the Mediterranean.

== Name ==
Kanal was attested in historical sources as in Canale Isontii in 1336 (and as in dem Canol in 1340 and im Kanal in 1389). The name is borrowed from the Italian common noun canale with the meaning 'long deep river gorge', referring to the configuration of the Soča Valley at the location.

== History ==
The first mention of the settlement dates to 1140, the year 1336 mentions the name of Dvor Svete Marije, and bridge in 1350. The center of the town was fortified in the Middle Ages. There are four towers left called bastions. There used to be a small castle, which was destroyed in 1264 and later rebuilt after the First World War as a residential building. In the 19th century small manufacturing plants were established. From 1900 until 1906, the Bohinj Railway was built.

== Cultural heritage ==
=== Bridge ===
The first bridge was built by the Romans. The current bridge was built after World War I. The bridge is around 17 meters tall and there are yearly diving events in mid-August. There are plans for building a new bridge to reduce traffic through the center. There is a diving platform on the northern side of the bridge and diving is allowed year round.

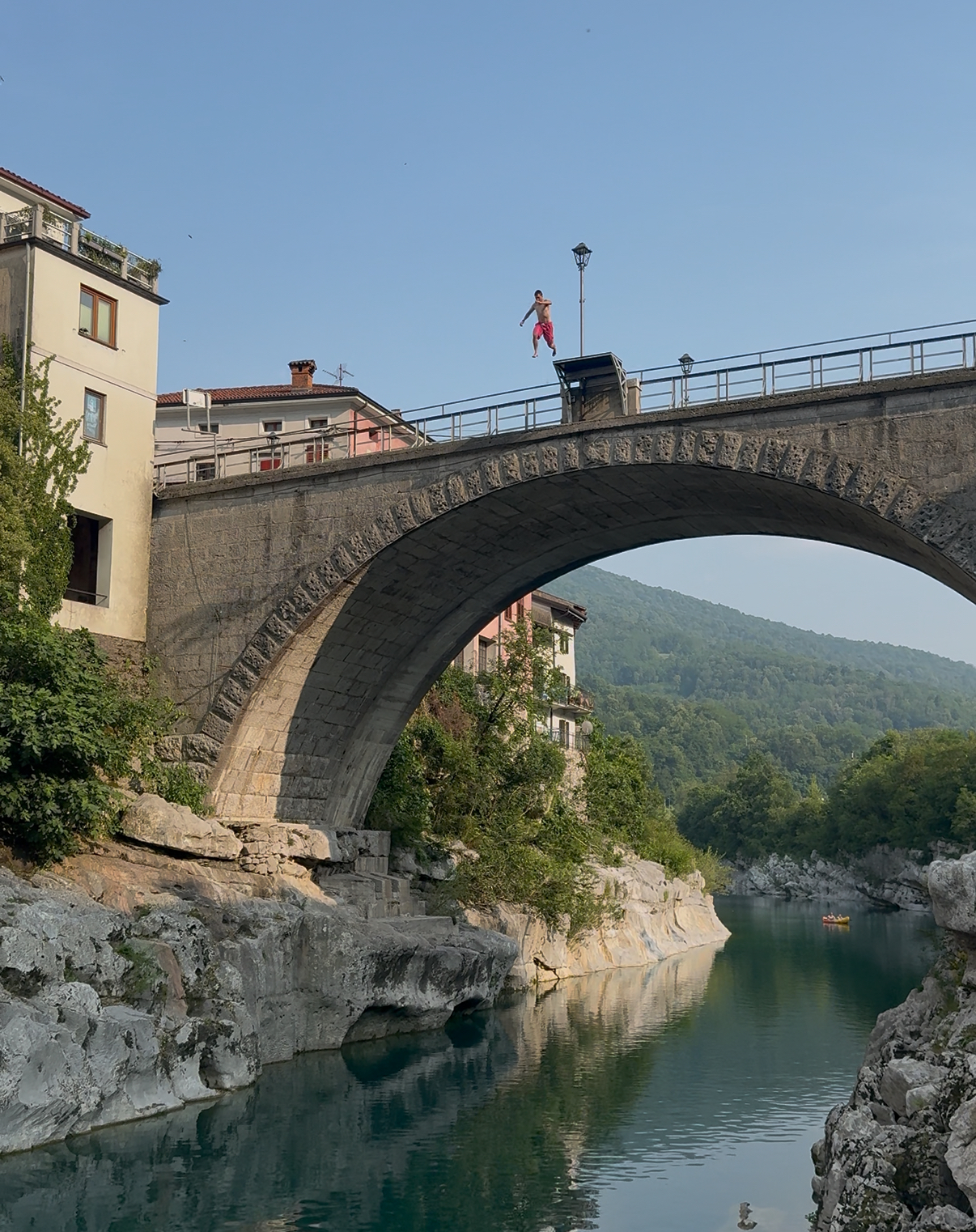
Jumping from the Kanal bridge

=== Neptune Fountain ===
The Neptune Fountain, next to the parish church in the centre of the settlement, was built in 1815.

=== Parish church ===
The parish church of Kanal is dedicated to the Assumption of Mary and belongs to the Diocese of Koper. The current church was built in the Gothic style in the 1430s on the site of a 13th-century predecessor. The still preserved Gothic element is the chancel, whereas the nave was redesigned from 1632 until 1670 in the Baroque style and the facade was redesigned from 1787 until 1795 in the Neoclassical style. The original bell tower was built in 1632, but demolished in World War I and later rebuilt in the Renaissance Revival style. The left (northern) side chapel, dedicated to Saint Anthony of Padua, was consecrated in 1662, whereas the right (southern) side chapel, dedicated to the Mother of God, was built in 1698.

== Economy ==
There is a small factory called Plastik Kanal in the town.

The main employer is cement factory Salonit Anhovo, co-incinerating waste.

== Notable people ==
- Ivo Hvalica, politician (SDS)
- Vojeslav Mole, poet and art historian
- Author Josip Ribičič's mother Marija Ribičić (born Križanič or Križnic)
- Ignazio Francesco Scodnik, Garibaldine general
- Valentin Stanič, mountaineer, author and philanthropist
- Ivan Čargo, painter and illustrator
- Riko Debenjak, academy-trained painter
- Anton Nanut, conductor
- Josip Kocijančič, composer

== Events ==
- Hiking on the steps of Valentin Stanič (Slovene: Pohod po stopinjah Valentina Staniča) in March/April
- Diving championship from 25 m (July)
- Festival Kontrada (July)
- Traditional diving championship from 17 m high bridge (August)
- Kogojevi dnevi – festival of modern music (September, October)
- Summer party – electronic music festival (August)
