= Anhovo =

- Location in Slovenia
- Coordinates: 46°3′31.59″N 13°37′24.75″E
- Country: Slovenia
- Traditional region: Littoral
- Statistical region: Gorizia
- Municipality: Kanal ob Soči

Area
  - Total: 5.56 km^{2} (2.15 sq mi)
- Elevation: 143.5 m (471 ft)

Population (2002)
  - Total: 610

Anhovo (pronounced [ˈaːŋxɔʋɔ]; Italian: Salona d'Isonzo, Anicova Corada before 1927) is a settlement on the right bank of the Soča River in the Municipality of Kanal ob Soči in the Littoral region of Slovenia. It is best known for its cement factory, Salonit Anhovo, built in 1921.

There is a small railway station on the outskirts of the settlement.
