= 16th Regiment "Belluno" =

Inactive Italian Army mountain infantry unit

- 16° Reggimento "Belluno"
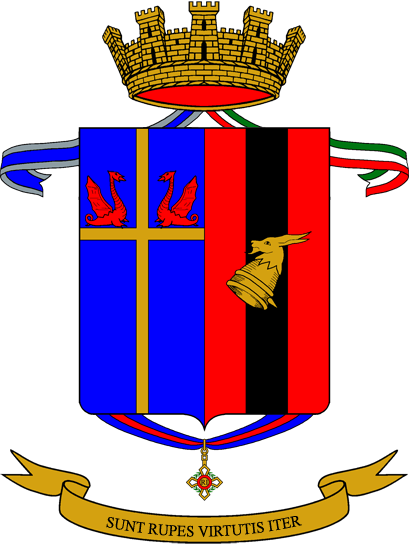
- Regimental coat of arms
- Active: 12 Nov. 1975 – 30 Nov. 2004
- Country: Italy
- Branch: Italian Army
- Type: Mountain Infantry
- Part of: Alpine Brigade "Cadore"
- Garrison/HQ: Belluno
- Motto: "Sunt rupes virtutis iter"
- Anniversaries: 23 April 1941
- Decorations: 1× Military Order of Italy; 1× Silver Medal of Military Valor; 1× Gold Medal of Civil Valor

Insignia
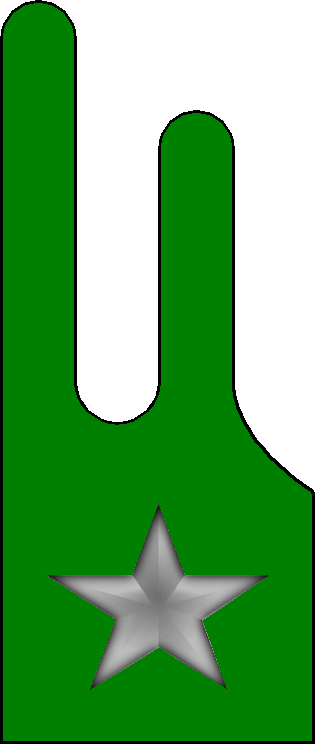
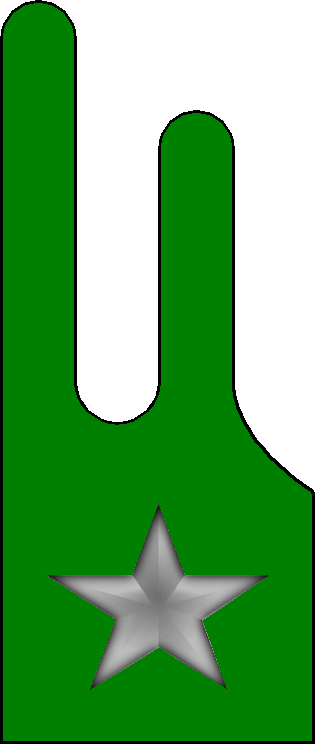
- Alpini gorget patches

The 16th Regiment "Belluno" (Italian: 16° Alpini "Belluno") is an inactive mountain warfare regiment of the Italian Army last based in Belluno in Veneto. The regiment belongs to the Italian Army's Alpini infantry speciality and was a training unit last assigned to the Alpine Troops Command. The regiment was formed in 1991 and consisted of the Alpini Battalion "Belluno", whose flag and traditions it inherited.

The Alpini Battalion "Belluno" was formed in 1910 and assigned to the 7th Alpini Regiment. During World War I the battalion fought in the alpine areas of the Italian front. In World War II the battalion fought in the invasion of France and the Greco-Italian War. On 8 September 1943, the Armistice of Cassibile was announced and four days later, on 12 September 1943, invading German forces disbanded the 7th Alpini Regiment and its battalions.

The battalion was reformed in 1953 and assigned to the 7th Alpini Regiment. In 1975, the 7th Alpini Regiment was disbanded and the "Belluno" battalion became an autonomous training unit, which in 1976 was granted its own flag. The battalion was assigned to the Alpine Brigade "Cadore". In 1991, the battalion entered the newly created Alpini Regiment "Belluno", which one year later was renamed 16th Regiment "Belluno". In 1997, the "Cadore" brigade was disbanded and the regiment transferred to the Alpine Brigade "Julia". At the end of the same year the regiment was transferred from the "Julia" brigade to the Alpine Troops Command. With the suspension of compulsory military service the regiment disbanded its Alpini companies in 2002. In 2004, the regiment was disbanded. The regiment's anniversary falls on 23 April 1941, the last day of the Greco-Italian War, during which the Alpini Battalion "Belluno" earned a Silver Medal of Military Valor.

== History ==
On 1 October 1910, the 7th Alpini Regiment formed the Alpini Battalion "Belluno" in the city of Belluno. Initially the battalion consisted of the newly formed 77th and 78th Alpini companies, with the 79th Alpini Company only formed in 1914. Since 1886 Alpini soldiers and non-commissioned officers were issued thread tufts, called Nappina in Italian, which were clipped to the Cappello Alpino headdress, and colored white for the troops of a regiment's first battalion, red for the troops of a regiment's second battalion, green for the troops of a regiment's third battalion, and blue for the troops of a regiment's fourth battalion. As the youngest, and thus third battalion of the 7th Alpini Regiment, the "Belluno" battalion received a green Nappina.

=== World War I ===
At the outbreak of World War I Italy declared its neutrality. In the autumn of 1914 the eight Alpini regiments formed 38 additional Alpini companies with men, who had completed their military service in the preceding four years. These companies were numbered from 80th to 117th and assigned to the existing Alpini battalions. The "Belluno" battalion formed the 106th Alpini Company, and then consisted of four companies. In January 1915, each Alpini battalion began with the formation of a reserve battalion, with men, who had completed their military service at least four years, but not more than eleven years prior. These reserve battalions were named for a valley (Italian: Valle; abbreviated Val) located near their associated regular Alpini battalion's base, and the reserve battalions received the same Nappina as their associated regular Alpini battalion. The "Belluno" battalion formed the Alpini Battalion "Val Cordevole", which consisted of the 206th, 266th, and 276th Alpini Company.

On 23 May 1915, Italy declared war on Austro-Hungary and the Alpini Battalion "Belluno" occupied position in the upper Val Cordevole. The battalion then fought in the Val Costeana, in the Tofane group, and on the Col di Lana. As the mountainous terrain of the Italian front made the deployment of entire Alpini regiments impracticable the Alpini battalions were employed either independently or assigned to groups, groupings, or infantry divisions as needed. By the end of 1915 the Alpini regiments began to form additional companies with recruits born in 1896. These new companies were numbered from 118th to 157th and were used, together with the 38 companies formed earlier, to form an additional reserve battalion for each regular battalion. These new battalions were named for a mountain (Italian: Monte) located near their associated regular Alpini battalion's base, and the reserve battalions received the same Nappina as their associated regular Alpini battalion. In December 1915, the Alpini Battalion "Belluno" ceded the 106th Alpini Company to the newly formed Alpini Battalion "Monte Pelmo", which also included the 146th, and 147th Alpini Company.

In 1916 the battalion remained in the area of Val Costeana and the Tofane group. On 22 May 1917, the VIII Skiers Battalion was disbanded and its personnel used to form the 300th and 301st Alpini companies, which were assigned to Alpini Battalion "Monte Marmolada", which had been formed on the same day. The battalion also received the newly formed 284th Alpini Company. The battalion was associated with the Alpini Battalion "Belluno" and therefore its troops wore a green Nappina.

In November and December 1917, after the disastrous Battle of Caporetto, the following retreat to the Piave river, and the subsequent First Battle of the Piave River and First Battle of Monte Grappa, the Royal Italian Army disbanded twenty Alpini battalions, which had suffered heavy casualties during the battles and retreat. Among the twenty battalions were the Alpini battalions "Belluno" and "Monte Marmolada": the "Belluno" had covered the Italian retreat from the main line of the Alps and was surrounded and destroyed by Austro-Hungarian troops at Cansiglio on 10 November 1917. The "Monte Marmolada" escaped the Austro-Hungarian advance and then fought in the Melette area on Monte Tonderecar and Monte Castelgomberto, where it suffered 676 casualties between 7 November and 5 December 1917. The two battalions were declared disbanded on 9 December 1917.

=== Interwar years ===
After the end of the war the Valle and Monte battalions were disbanded, with the exception of the Alpini Battalion "Val Cordevole", which on 16 March 1919 was renamed Alpini Battalion "Belluno". On 27 October 1934, the III Alpine Brigade was renamed III Superior Alpine Command. In December of the same year the command was given the name "Julio". On 31 October 1935, the III Superior Alpine Command "Julio" was reorganized as 3rd Alpine Division "Julia", which included the 7th Alpini Regiment, 8th Alpini Regiment, 9th Alpini Regiment, and 3rd Alpine Artillery Regiment "Julia".

On 22 December 1935, the 7th Alpini Regiment was mobilized for the Second Italo-Ethiopian War. On the same date the regiment received the Alpini Battalion "Pieve di Teco" from the 1st Alpini Regiment and the Alpini Battalion "Exilles" from the 3rd Alpini Regiment. On 31 December of the same year, the 7th Alpini Regiment, which now consisted of the Alpini Battalions "Feltre", "Pieve di Teco", and "Exilles", was assigned to the newly formed 5th Alpine Division "Pusteria", which also included the newly formed 11th Alpini Regiment and 5th Alpine Artillery Regiment "Pusteria". On 6 January 1936 the "Pusteria" division's units embarked in Livorno and Naples for the transfer to Massawa in Eritrea.

On 15 February 1936, the 7th Alpini Regiment's depot in Belluno formed the command of the 12th Alpini Regiment, which took command of 7th Alpini Regiment's battalions "Pieve di Cadore" and "Belluno", which had remained in Italy. In April 1937, the "Pusteria" division returned to Italy and the 7th Alpini Regiment returned to Belluno, while the Alpini battalions "Pieve di Teco" and "Exilles" returned to their respective regiments. On 24 April of the same year, the 12th Alpini Regiment was disbanded and the battalions "Pieve di Cadore" and "Belluno" returned to the 7th Alpini Regiment.

=== World War II ===
On 10 June 1940, Italy entered World War II and the Alpini Battalion "Belluno", which consisted of a command company, and the 77th, 78th, and 79th Alpini companies, participated, together with the rest of the 7th Alpini Regiment, in the invasion of France.

In November 1940, the 5th Alpine Division "Pusteria" was transferred to Albania to shore up the crumbling Italian front during the Greco-Italian War. By late November 1940, the 7th Alpini Regiment entered the front in the Berat sector. In December 1940, the regiment suffered heavy losses in the Greek counter-offensive. The regiment was forced to retreat into Albania, where it continued to fight and suffered further heavy losses. The regiment remained at the frontline in Albania until the German invasion of Greece in April 1941. The "Pusteria" division then pursued the retreating Greek forces. For its conduct and service on the Greek front between 27 November 1940 and 25 April 1941 the Alpini Battalion "Belluno" was awarded a Silver Medal of Military Valor, which was affixed to the 7th Alpini Regiment's flag and added to the regiment's coat of arms.

After the conclusion of the Greco-Italian War and the Invasion of Yugoslavia in April 1941 the "Pusteria" division was sent in July 1941 as occupation force to Pljevlja in Montenegro. Soon the division was embroiled in heavy fighting against Yugoslavian Partisans, which culminated in the Battle of Pljevlja in December 1941. On 15 February 1942, the regiment formed a support weapons company for each of its three battalions and the Alpini Battalion "Belluno" received the 106th Support Weapons Company. These companies were equipped with Breda M37 machine guns, and 45mm Mod. 35 and 81mm Mod. 35 mortars.

In August 1942, the division was repatriated, and – after two months of rest – participated in the Axis occupation of Vichy France. Afterwards the "Pusteria" division took up garrison duties in Alpes-Maritimes. After the announcement of the Armistice of Cassibile on 8 September 1943 part of the division surrendered to invading German forces near Gap, while the 7th Alpini Regiment tried to return to the Italian region of Piedmont. However German forces blocked the regiment's path at the Col de Tende pass and the regiment was disbanded by the Germans on 12 September 1943.

=== Cold War ===
On 1 July 1953, the command and the command company of the 7th Alpini Regiment were reformed in Belluno. On 1 September of the same year, the Alpini battalions "Pieve di Cadore" and "Belluno" were reformed in Belluno and assigned to the regiment. On 1 December of the same year, the regiment joined the newly formed Alpine Brigade "Cadore", which also included the 6th Mountain Artillery Regiment. The "Cadore" brigade was tasked with defending the Piave valley. In 1957 the regiment formed the 7th Mortar Company, which was split on 31 December 1964 to form a mortar company for each of the regiment's three battalions. Afterwards the Alpini Battalion "Belluno" consisted of the following units:

- Alpini Battalion "Belluno", in Belluno
  - Command and Services Company
  - 77th, 78th, and 79th Alpini Company
  - 116th Mortar Company

In October 1963, the 7th Alpini Regiment's troops were sent to Longarone to help rescue efforts after the Vajont dam disaster. For its conduct in Longarone the regiment was awarded a Gold Medal of Civil Valor, which was affixed to the regiment's flag and added to the regiment's coat of arms.

During the 1975 army reform the army disbanded the regimental level and newly independent battalions were granted for the first time their own flags. On 21 August 1975, the Alpini Battalion "Belluno" was reorganized as a recruits training battalion and the 116th Mortar Company reduced to a reserve unit. On 11 November 1975, the 7th Alpini Regiment was disbanded and the next day the regiment's three battalions became autonomous units and were assigned to the Alpine Brigade "Orobica". On 12 November 1976 the President of the Italian Republic Giovanni Leone granted the Alpini Battalion "Belluno" a new flag. At the same time the medals and military honors awarded to the "Belluno" battalion were transferred from the flag of the 7th Alpini Regiment to the battalion's flag, while the medals and military honors awarded to the entire regiment were duplicated for the flag of the battalion. Consequently, the "Belluno" battalion's flag was decorated with one Military Order of Italy, one Silver Medal of Military Valor, and one Gold Medal of Civil Valor. The three awards were also added to the battalion's newly created coat of arms.

=== Recent times ===
On 18 September 1991, the Alpini Battalion "Belluno" lost its autonomy and the next day the battalion entered the newly formed Alpini Regiment "Belluno", which inherited the "Belluno" battalion's flag, traditions, honors and coat of arms. On the same date the "Belluno" battalion's 77th Alpini Company was suspended and the 116th Mortar Company was disbanded. On 7 September 1992, the regiment was renamed 16th Regiment "Belluno".

On 31 January 1997, the Alpine Brigade "Cadore" was disbanded and the 16th Regiment "Belluno" was assigned the next day to the Alpine Brigade "Julia". On 31 December 1997, the regiment was transferred to the Alpine Troops Command. With the suspension of compulsory military service in 2000 the regiment suspended the 78th and 79th Alpini Company in 2002. For the next two years the regiment consisted only of the Command and Logistic Support Company, which maintend the regiment's base in Belluno.

On 30 September 2004 the 16th Regiment "Belluno" was disbanded and the regiment's flag transferred to the Shrine of the Flags in the Vittoriano in Rome. Subsequently the 7th Alpini Regiment, which had been reformed in Feltre in 1992, moved from Feltre to Belluno in the empty base of the 16th Regiment "Belluno".

== Organization ==
When the 16th Regiment "Belluno" was disbanded it had the following organization:

- 16th Regiment "Belluno", in Belluno
  - Command and Logistic Support Company
  - Alpini Battalion "Belluno"
    - 77th Alpini Company (suspended 1991)
    - 78th Alpini Company (suspended 2002)
    - 79th Alpini Company (suspended 2002)
    - 116th Mortar Company (reserve unit 1975–91, disbanded 1991)
