= 7th Alpini Regiment =

Active Italian Army mountain infantry unit

- 7° Reggimento Alpini
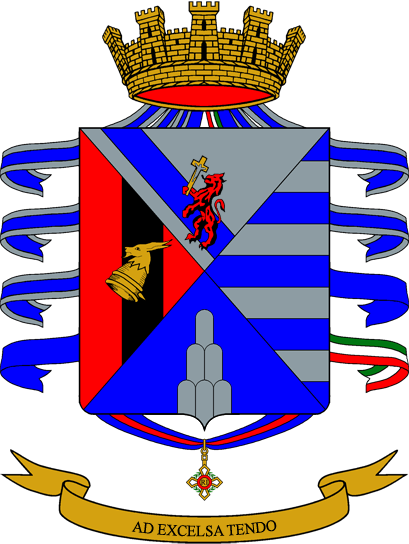
- Regimental coat of arms
- Active: 1 Aug. 1887 – 12 Sept. 1943; 1 July 1953 – today
- Country: Italy
- Branch: Italian Army
- Type: Mountain Infantry
- Part of: Alpine Brigade "Julia"
- Garrison/HQ: Belluno
- Motto: "Ad excelsa tendo"
- Anniversaries: 23 April 1941
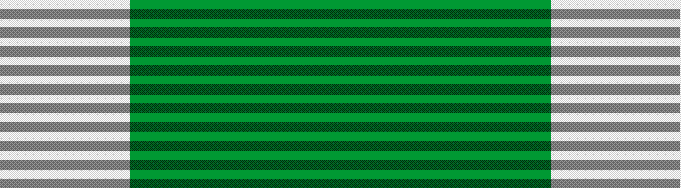
- Decorations: 2× Military Order of Italy; 5× Silver Medals of Military Valor; 2× Bronze Medals of Military Valor; 1× Gold Medal of Civil Valor; 1× Italian Red Cross Bronze Medal of Merit; 1× Silver Medal of Merit

Insignia
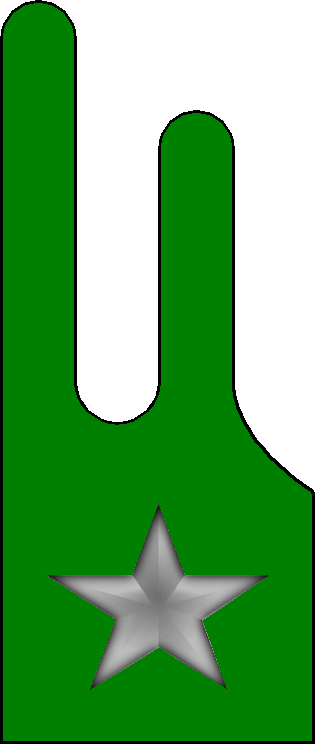
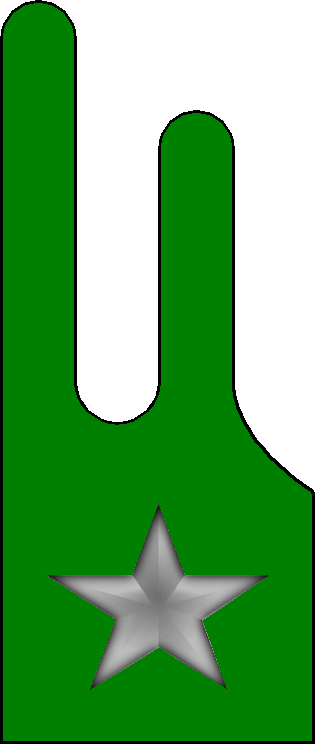
- Alpini gorget patches

The 7th Alpini Regiment (Italian: 7° Reggimento Alpini) is a mountain warfare regiment of the Italian Army based in Belluno in Veneto. The regiment belongs to the Italian Army's Alpini infantry speciality and is assigned to the Alpine Brigade "Julia". On 1 August 1887, the Royal Italian Army formed the 7th Alpini Regiment by splitting the 6th Alpini Regiment. The new regiment's recruiting area initially consisted of the valleys of the Bellunes Alps, Carnic Alps, Carnic Prealps, and the Western side of the Julian Alps. In 1909 the regiment was split to form the 8th Alpini Regiment and afterwards the regiment's recruiting area consisted of the Bellunes Alps.

During World War I the regiment expanded to ten battalions, which fought separately in the alpine areas of the Italian front. In 1935 the regiment was assigned to the 5th Alpine Division "Pusteria", with which it participated in the Second Italo-Ethiopian War. During World War II the regiment fought in the invasion of France and the Greco-Italian War. Afterwards the regiment served on occupation duty in Montenegro and, after the occupation of Vichy France, in Alpes-Maritimes. On 8 September 1943, the Armistice of Cassibile was announced and four days later, on 12 September 1943, invading German forces disbanded the 7th Alpini Regiment.

In 1953 the 7th Alpini Regiment was reformed and assigned to the Alpine Brigade "Cadore". In 1975 the regiment was disbanded and its flag and traditions assigned to the Alpini Battalion "Feltre". The regiment was reformed in 1992. The regiment's anniversary falls on 23 April 1941, the last day of the Greco-Italian War, during which the regiment's Alpini Battalion "Feltre" earned a Silver Medal of Military Valor.

== History ==
On 1 November 1882, the Royal Italian Army formed six Alpini regiments, one of which was the 6th Alpini Regiment in Conegliano in Veneto. On 1 November 1886, the 6th Alpini Regiment formed the Alpini Battalion "Feltre" in Feltre, with companies ceded by the Battalion "Val Brenta" and Battalion "Cadore". On the same day the all Alpini battalions changed their names from their recruiting zones to the cities and towns, where their base was located. Furthermore Alpini soldiers and non-commissioned officers were issued thread tufts, called Nappina in Italian, which were clipped to the Cappello Alpino headdress, and colored white for the troops of a regiment's first battalion, red for the troops of a regiment's second battalion, green for the troops of a regiment's third battalion, and blue for the troops of a regiment's fourth battalion. As the 6th Alpini Regiment had grown to six battalions and had become too complex to administer it was divided on 1 August 1887 into the 6th Alpini Regiment and 7th Alpini Regiment. The latter was formed in Conegliano with the regimental command of the 6th Alpini Regiment and the battalions "Feltre", "Pieve di Cadore" and "Gemona". On the same date the regimental command of the 6th Alpini Regiment was reformed in Verona. The 7th Alpini Regiment then consisted of the following units:

- 7th Alpini Regiment, in Conegliano
  - Alpini Battalion "Feltre", in Feltre
    - 64th, 65th, and 66th Alpini Company
  - Alpini Battalion "Pieve di Cadore", in Pieve di Cadore
    - 67th, 68th, and 75th Alpini Company
  - Alpini Battalion "Gemona", in Gemona
    - 69th, 70th, 71st, and 72nd Alpini Company

In 1887–88 the regiment's 69th Alpini Company deployed to Massawa for the Italo-Ethiopian War of 1887–1889, which led to the establishment of the Italian colony of Eritrea. In 1895–96 the regiment provided 15 officers and 533 troops to help form the I and V provisional Alpini battalions, which were deployed to Eritrea for the First Italo-Ethiopian War. In 1901 the regiment was assigned together with the 6th Alpini Regiment to the III Alpini Group, which on 9 August 1910 was renamed III Alpine Brigade. On 9 January 1908, the regiment formed the Alpini Battalion "Tolmezzo" in Tolmezzo, which consisted of the 6th, 12th, and 72nd Alpini companies, which had been by the Alpini Battalion "Ceva" of the 1st Alpini Regiment, the Alpini Battalion "Borgo San Dalmazzo" of the 2nd Alpini Regiment, respectively the Alpini Battalion "Gemona" of the 7th Alpini Regiment. In December 1908 the regiment was deployed to the area of the Strait of Messina for the recovery efforts after the 1908 Messina earthquake. For its service the regiment was awarded a Silver Medal of Merit, which was affixed to the regiment's flag.

On 1 October 1909, the regiment transferred the Alpini battalions "Gemona" and "Tolmezzo" to the newly formed 8th Alpini Regiment. On 1 October 1910, the 7th Alpini Regiment formed the Alpini Battalion "Belluno" in Belluno, which consisted of the newly formed 77th and 78th Alpini companies, while the battalion's 79th Alpini Company was only formed in 1914. After the formation of the new battalion the regiment's command moved from Conegliano to Belluno.

=== Italo-Turkish War ===
On 29 September 1911 the Kingdom of Italy declared war against the Ottoman Empire and the Alpini Battalion "Feltre" was deployed to Libya for the Italo-Turkish War. In October 1912 the battalion was assigned to the 8th Special Regiment, which had been formed in Libya with the command of the 8th Alpini Regiment and was led by Colonel Antonio Cantore. On 23 March 1913, the 8th Special Regiment fought in the Battle of Assaba against local rebel forces. For its conduct in the Battle of Assaba the Alpini Battalion "Feltre", was awarded a Silver Medal of Military Valor, which was affixed to the flag of the 7th Alpini Regiment and added to the regiment's coat of arms. During the war the 7th Alpini Regiment also provided one officer and 444 troops to augment other units fighting in the war.

=== World War I ===
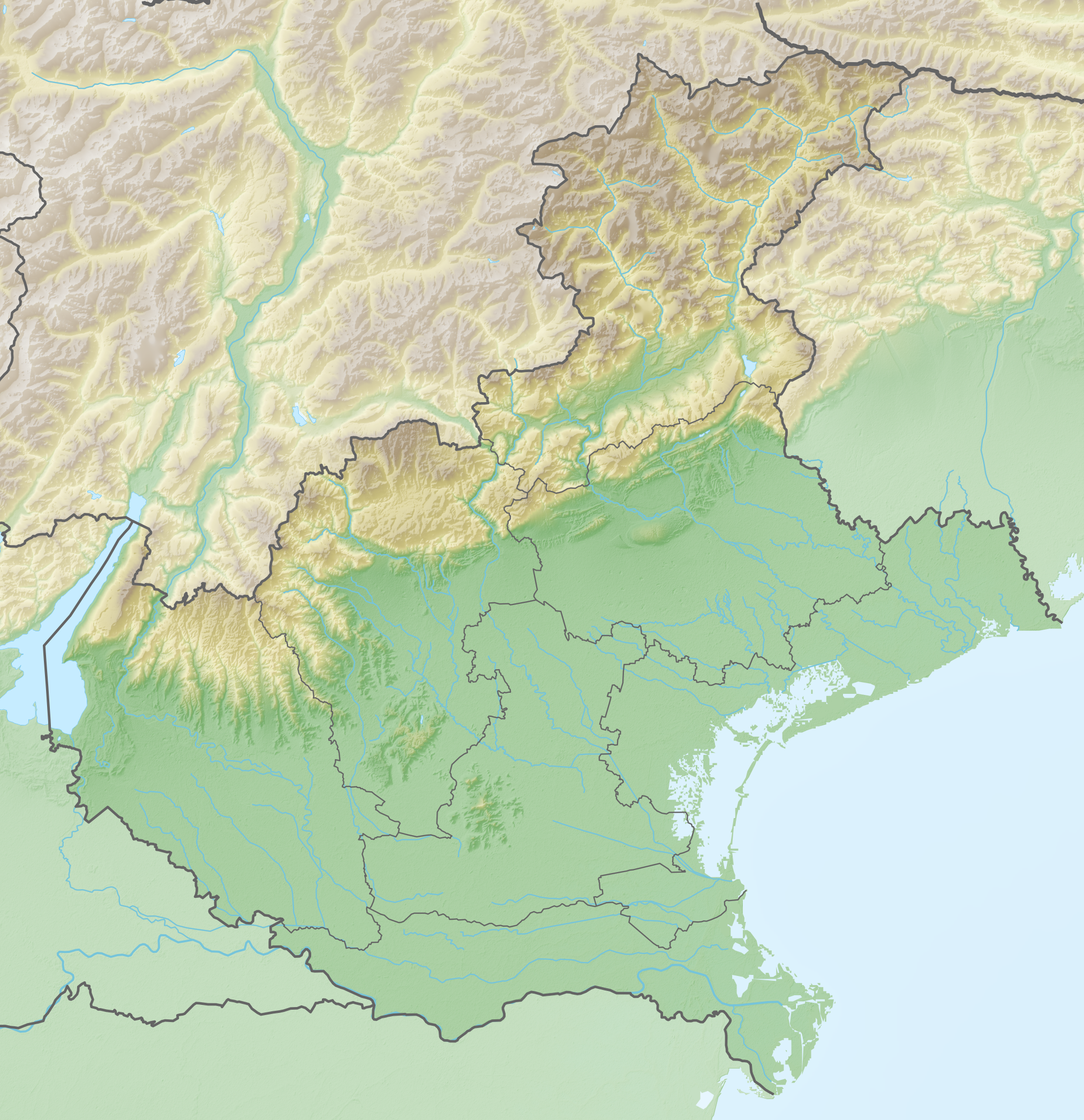
7th Alpini Regiment location in 1910

At the outbreak of World War I the Alpini speciality consisted of eight regiments, which fielded 26 battalions with 79 companies. Each Alpini battalion, with the exception of the Alpini Battalion "Verona", fielded three Alpini companies, while the Alpini Battalion "Verona" fielded four companies. Each company consisted of one captain, four lieutenants and 250 other ranks. After Italy's initial declaration of neutrality 38 additional Alpini companies were formed during the autumn of 1914 with men, who had completed their military service in the preceding four years. These companies were numbered from 80th to 117th and assigned to the existing Alpini battalions. In January 1915, each Alpini battalion formed a reserve battalion, with men, who had completed their military service at least four years, but not more than eleven years prior. These reserve battalions were named for a valley (Italian: Valle; abbreviated Val) located near their associated regular Alpini battalion's base, and the reserve battalions received the same Nappina as their associated regular Alpini battalion. The companies of the Valle battalions were numbered from 201st to 281st, with the numbers 227th, 233rd, 237th, 271st, and 273rd unused.

On 23 May 1915, Italy declared war on Austria-Hungary and at the time the 7th Alpini Regiment consisted of the following units:

- 7th Alpini Regiment, in Belluno
  - Alpini Battalion "Feltre"
    - 64th, 65th, 66th, and 95th Alpini Company
  - Alpini Battalion "Pieve di Cadore"
    - 67th, 68th, 75th, and 96th Alpini Company
  - Alpini Battalion "Belluno"
    - 77th, 78th, 79th, and 106th Alpini Company
  - Alpini Battalion "Val Cismon"
    - 264th and 265th Alpini Company (277th Alpini Company joined the battalion in November 1915)
  - Alpini Battalion "Val Piave"
    - 267th and 268th (275th Alpini Company joined the battalion in November 1915)
  - Alpini Battalion "Val Cordevole"
    - 206th and 266th (276th Alpini Company joined the battalion in November 1915)

After the declaration of war the regiment's battalions operated in groups two in the following areas: the Alpini battalions "Feltre" and "Val Cismon" in the Brenta – Cismon area, the Alpini battalions "Belluno" and "Val Cordevole" in the Cordevole and Passo Fedaia area, and the Alpini battalions "Pieve di Cadore" and "Val Piave" in the Ansiei – Padola area, which included Monte Piana. By the end of 1915 the Alpini regiments began to form additional companies with recruits born in 1896. These new companies were numbered from 118th to 157th and were used, together with the 38 companies formed earlier, to form an additional reserve battalion for each regular battalion. These new battalions were named for a mountain (Italian: Monte) located near their associated regular Alpini battalion's base, and the reserve battalions received the same Nappina as their associated regular Alpini battalion. The 7th Alpini Regiment thus added the following Monte battalions:

- Alpini Battalion "Monte Pavione"
  - 95th, 148th, and 149th Alpini Company
- Alpini Battalion "Monte Antelao"
  - 96th, 150th, and 151st Alpini Company
- Alpini Battalion "Monte Pelmo"
  - 106th, 146th, and 147th Alpini Company

As the mountainous terrain of the Italian front made the deployment of entire Alpini regiments impracticable, the regimental commands of the eight Alpini regiments were disbanded in March 1916. Likewise in April 1916 the pre-war alpine brigade commands were disbanded, and the personnel of the regimental commands and alpine brigade commands used to from twenty regiment-sized group commands and nine brigade-sized grouping commands. Afterwards Alpini battalions were employed either independently or assigned to groups, groupings, or infantry divisions as needed.

In February and March 1917 the Royal Italian Army formed twelve skiers battalions, each with two skiers companies. On 22 May 1917, the VIII Skiers Battalion was disbanded and its personnel used to form the 300th and 301st Alpini companies, which were assigned to Alpini Battalion "Monte Marmolada", which had been formed on the same day. The battalion also received the newly formed 284th Alpini Company and was assigned to the 7th Alpini Regiment. The battalion was associated with the Alpini Battalion "Belluno" and therefore its troops wore a green Nappina.

In November and December 1917, after the disastrous Battle of Caporetto, the following retreat to the Piave river, and the subsequent First Battle of the Piave River and First Battle of Monte Grappa, the Royal Italian Army disbanded twenty Alpini battalions, which had suffered heavy casualties during the battles and retreat. Among the twenty battalions were the Alpini battalions "Belluno" and "Monte Marmolada" of the 7th Alpini Regiment: the "Belluno" had covered the Italian retreat from the main line of the Alps and was surrounded and destroyed by Austro-Hungarian troops at Cansiglio on 10 November 1917. The "Monte Marmolada" escaped the Austro-Hungarian advance and then fought in the Melette area on Monte Tonderecar and Monte Castelgomberto, where it suffered 676 casualties between 7 November and 5 December 1917. The two battalions were declared disbanded on 9 December 1917.

During the war 141 officers and 3,602 soldiers of the regiment were killed in action, while 205 officers and 6,578 soldiers were wounded. For their service and sacrifice during the war two of the regiment's battalions were awarded a Silver Medal of Military Valor and two a Bronze Medal of Military Valor:

- the Alpini Battalion "Monte Marmolada" was awarded a Silver Medal of Military Valor for its defense of Monte Tonderecar on 15–22 November 1917 and Monte Castelgomberto on 4–5 December 1917.
- the Alpini Battalion "Monte Pavione" was awarded a Silver Medal of Military Valor for its conduct during the First Battle of Monte Grappa in the Val Calcino on 11–13 December 1917.
- the Alpini Battalion "Feltre" was awarded a Bronze Medal of Military Valor for its conduct during the First Battle of Monte Grappa in the Val Calcino and on Monte Valderoa in November and December 1917.
- the Alpini Battalion "Val Cismon" was awarded a Bronze Medal of Military Valor for its conduct during the First Battle of Monte Grappa on Monte Tomatico, Monte Solarolo, and Monte Valderoa between 14 November and 18 December 1917.

The two Silver Medals of Military Valor and two Bronze Medals of Military Valor were affixed to the 7th Alpini Regiment's flag and added to the regiment's coat of arms.

=== Interwar years ===
After the end of the war the Valle and Monte battalions were disbanded, with the exception of the Alpini Battalion "Val Cordevole", which on 16 March 1919 was renamed Alpini Battalion "Belluno". At the same time the Alpini Battalion "Feltre" was sent to the Italian Protectorate of Albania to fight in the Vlora War. In 1921, the regiment transferred the Alpini Battalion "Feltre" after its return from Albania to the newly formed 9th Alpini Regiment. With the transfer of the battalion also the military awards of the battalion were transferred from the 7th Alpini Regiment to the 9th Alpini Regiment and affixed to the flag of the latter. During 1921 the regiment, which consisted now of the Alpini battalions "Pieve di Cadore" and "Belluno", was assigned to the 3rd Alpine Division, which also included the 8th Alpini Regiment, 9th Alpini Regiment, and 2nd Mountain Artillery Regiment. In 1923, the 3rd Alpine Division was replaced by the III Alpini Grouping, which in 1926 was reorganized as III Alpine Brigade. However, the same year the 7th Alpini Regiment was transferred to the II Alpine Brigade Command, which also included the 5th Alpini Regiment, 6th Alpini Regiment, and 2nd Mountain Artillery Regiment. In November 1926, the Alpini Battalion "Feltre" returned to the regiment. In 1929 the 7th Alpini Regiment was transferred from the II Alpine Brigade Command to the III Alpine Brigade Command.

On 27 October 1934, the III Alpine Brigade was renamed III Superior Alpine Command. In December of the same year the command was given the name "Julio". On 31 October 1935, the III Superior Alpine Command "Julio" was reorganized as 3rd Alpine Division "Julia", which included the 7th Alpini Regiment, 8th Alpini Regiment, 9th Alpini Regiment, and 3rd Alpine Artillery Regiment "Julia". On 31 December 1935, the 7th Alpini Regiment was transferred to the newly formed 5th Alpine Division "Pusteria".

=== Second Italo-Ethiopian War ===
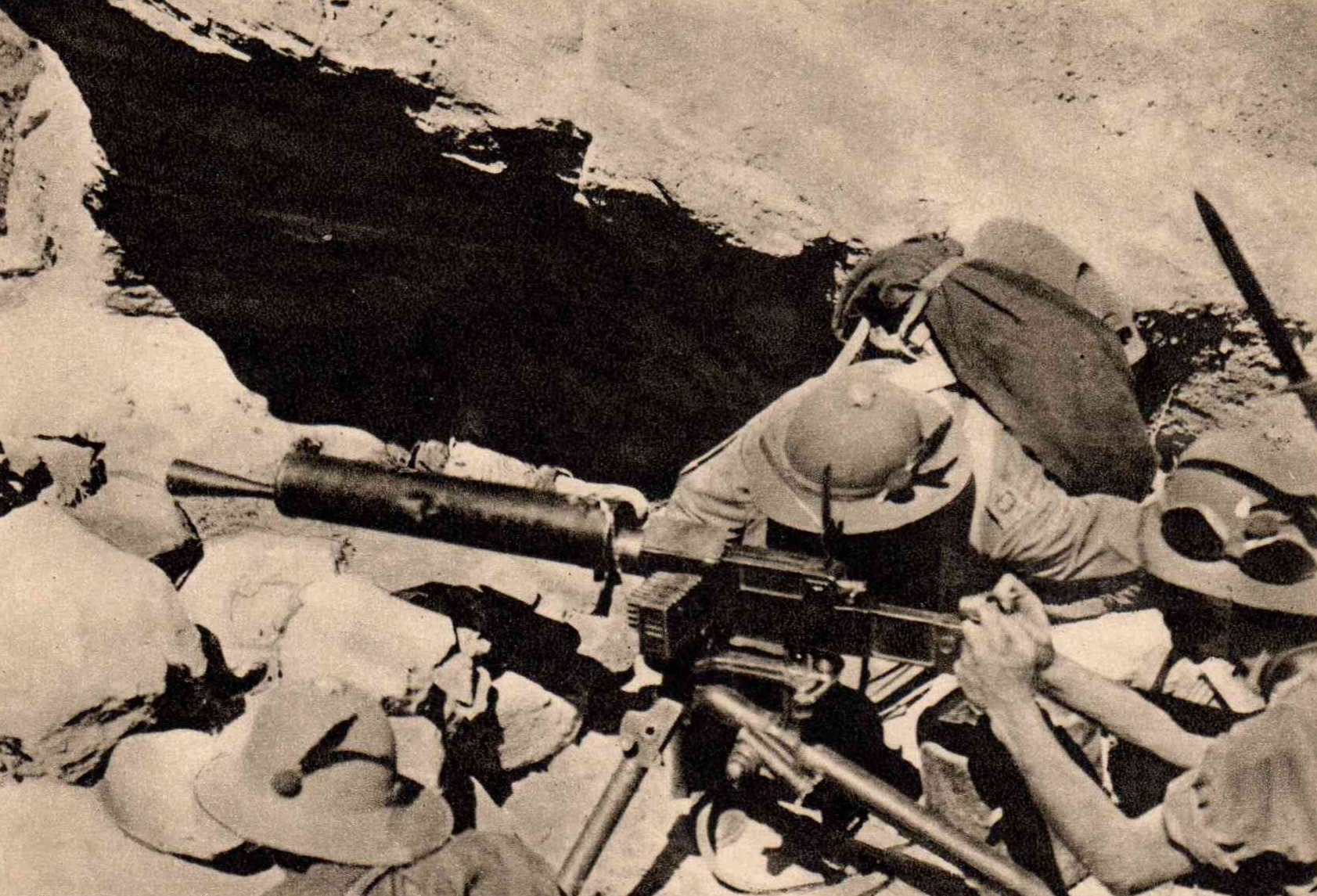
Alpini with a Fiat–Revelli Mod. 1914 machine gun during the Battle of Amba Aradam

On 22 December 1935, the 7th Alpini Regiment was mobilized for the Second Italo-Ethiopian War. On the same date the regiment received the Alpini Battalion "Pieve di Teco" from the 1st Alpini Regiment and the Alpini Battalion "Exilles" from the 3rd Alpini Regiment. On 31 December of the same year, the 7th Alpini Regiment, which now consisted of the Alpini Battalions "Feltre", "Pieve di Teco", and "Exilles", was assigned to the newly formed 5th Alpine Division "Pusteria", which also included the newly formed 11th Alpini Regiment and 5th Alpine Artillery Regiment "Pusteria". On 6 January 1936 the "Pusteria" division's units embarked in Livorno and Naples for the transfer to Massawa in Eritrea. The same month the depot of the 7th Alpini Regiment formed the command and the 643rd Company of the VII Replacements Battalion. The replacement troops were volunteers drawn from the regiments, which had transferred battalions to the 7th Alpini Regiment for the war. The VII Replacements Battalion consisted of the 603rd, 614th, and 643rd companies, with the 603rd Company having been formed by the 1st Alpini Regiment and the 614th Company by the 3rd Alpini Regiment. Each of the three companies used a different colored Nappina, with the color corresponding to the battalion of the deployed regiment the company was meant to support. The VII Replacements Battalion was attached to 7th Alpini Regiment and immediately shipped to Eritrea, where in the meantime the "Pusteria" was engaged in combat against Ethiopian troops.

On 15 February 1936, the 7th Alpini Regiment's depot in Belluno formed the command of the 12th Alpini Regiment, which took command of 7th Alpini Regiment's battalions "Pieve di Cadore" and "Belluno", which had remained in Italy. The 12th Alpini Regiment was assigned to the 3rd Alpine Division "Julia" and also included the Complement Officer Cadets Battalion "Bolzano" of the 6th Alpini Regiment, which was detached to the Alpini specialty's Complement Officer Cadets School in Bassano del Grappa.

On 10–19 February 1936, the "Pusteria" fought in the Battle of Amba Aradam and on 27–29 February in the Second Battle of Tembien. During the latter battle a volunteer force of 150 Alpini of the VII Replacements Battalion conquered the Northern summit of Amba Uork in a night attack. For this the battalion was awarded a Bronze Medal of Military Valor. On 15 March 1936, the commanding officer of the VII Replacements Battalion, Major Tommaso Risi, renamed the battalion Alpini Battalion "Uork Amba". The 7th Alpini Regiment and Alpini Battalion "Uork Amba" then fought in the Battle of Maychew and the Battle of Lake Ashenge. After the end of the war the "Pusteria" remained in Ethiopia and was tasked with subjugating the restive population. On 22 October 1936, the 7th Alpini Regiment's depot in Feltre formed a second VII Replacements Battalion with volunteers. The battalion arrived in Ethiopia on 15 January 1937 and its personnel was merged into the Alpini Battalion "Uork Amba".

On 18 March 1937, the Alpini Battalion "Uork Amba" left the 7th Alpini Regiment and on the same day the name of the battalion was officially sanctioned. The battalion remained in Ethiopia as an autonomous unit, while the "Pusteria" division returned to Italy, where its last units disembarked in Naples on 12 April 1937. The next day the division was honored with a parade through Rome and then the division's units returned to their bases. The 7th Alpini Regiment returned to Belluno, while the Alpini battalions "Pieve di Teco" and "Exilles" returned to their respective regiments, and the Alpini Battalion "Feltre" returned to the city of Feltre. On 24 April of the same year, the 12th Alpini Regiment was disbanded and the battalions "Pieve di Cadore" and "Belluno" returned to the 7th Alpini Regiment. Initially the Complement Officer Cadets Battalion "Bolzano" was also assigned to the 7th Alpini Regiment, but it was soon transferred to the 11th Alpini Regiment.

For its service and conduct in Ethiopia the 7th Alpini Regiment was awarded, together with all other infantry regiments that had served in the war, a Military Order of Italy, which was affixed to the flag of the 7th Alpini Regiment. The Bronze Medal of Military Valor awarded to the Alpini Battalion "Uork Amba" was affixed to the flag of the battalion.

=== World War II ===
On 2 September 1939, one day after the German Invasion of Poland had begun, the Alpini battalions "Val Cismon", "Val Piave", and "Val Cordevole" were reformed with reservists and assigned to the 4th Alpini Group. On 10 June 1940, the day Italy entered World War II, the regiment fielded 160 officers and 5,046 other ranks for a total strength of 5,206 men. The regiment had 23 horses, 1,242 mules and 109 transport vehicles at its disposal. The regiment's organization at the time was as follows:

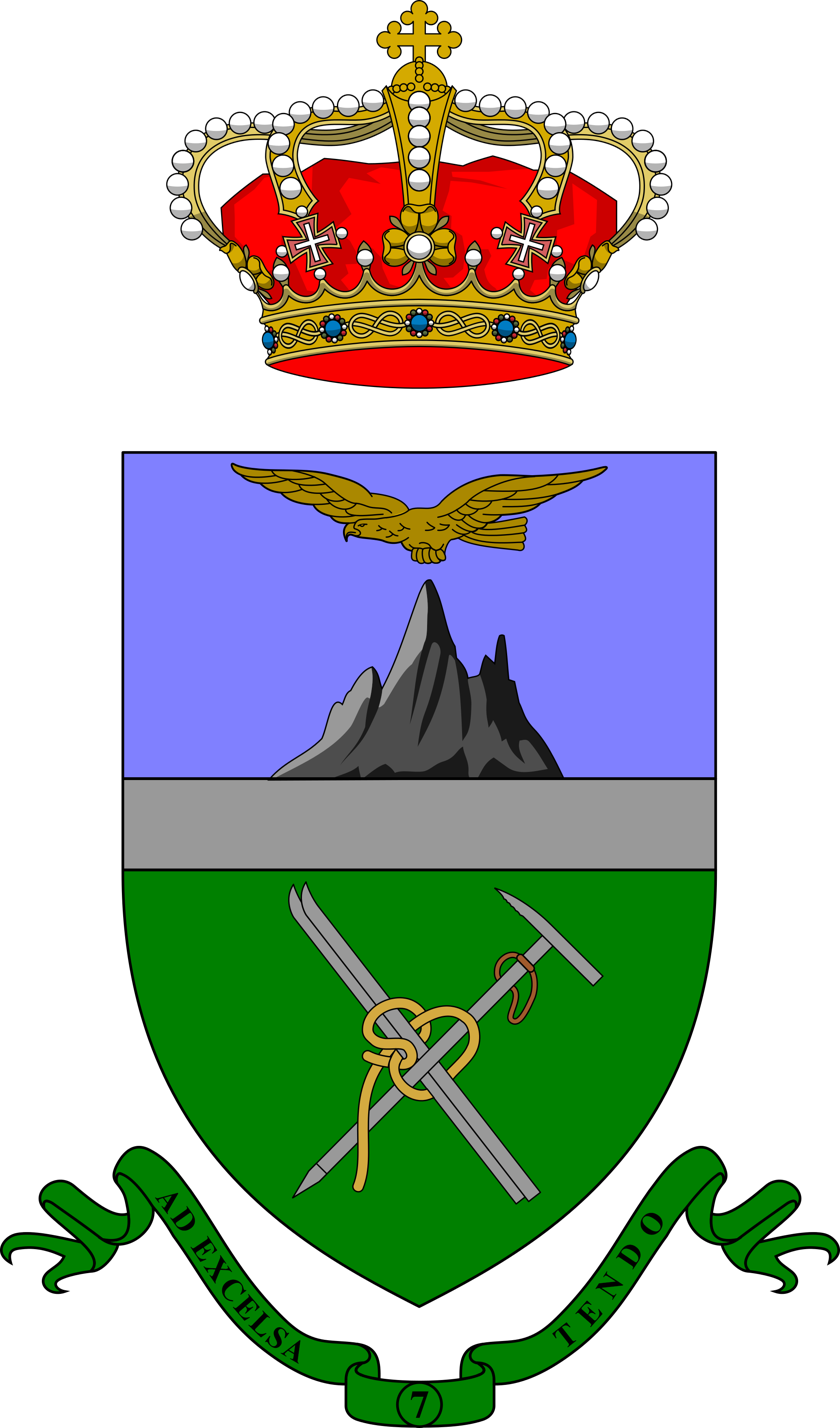
- 7th Alpini Regiment, in Belluno
  - Regimental Command Company
  - Alpini Battalion "Feltre”
    - Command Company
    - 64th, 65th, and 66th Alpini Company
  - Alpini Battalion "Pieve di Cadore"
    - Command Company
    - 67th, 68th, and 75th Alpini Company
  - Alpini Battalion "Belluno"
    - Command Company
    - 77th, 78th, and 79th Alpini Company
  - 7th Supply Section
  - 307th Medical Section (includes the 624th Field Hospital)
  - 27th Train Section (equipped with mules)

In June 1940 the regiment participated in the invasion of France. After the Battle of France the Alpini battalions "Val Cismon", "Val Piave", and "Val Cordevole" were disbanded on 31 October 1940.

In November 1940, the 5th Alpine Division "Pusteria" was transferred to Albania to shore up the crumbling Italian front during the Greco-Italian War. By late November 1940, the 7th Alpini Regiment entered the front in the Berat sector. In December 1940, the regiment suffered heavy losses in the Greek counter-offensive. On 8 December 1940, the regiment's commanding officer Colonel Rodolfo Psaro was killed in action during one of the Greek attacks. The regiment was forced to retreat into Albania, where it continued to fight and suffered further heavy losses. As reinforcement the Alpini Battalion "Val Cismon" was reformed on 2 January 1941 and sent to Albania, where it joined the 7th Alpini Regiment on 17 January 1941. The regiment remained at the frontline in Albania until the German invasion of Greece in April 1941. The "Pusteria" division then pursued the retreating Greek forces. For their conduct and service on the Greek front between 24 November 1940 and 23 April 1941 the Alpini battalions "Feltre" and "Pieve di Cadore" were awarded a shared Silver Medal of Military Valor, while the Alpini Battalion "Belluno" was awarded a Silver Medal of Military Valor for its conduct and valor between 27 November 1940 and 25 April 1941. Likewise the Alpini Battalion "Val Cismon" was awarded a Silver Medal of Military Valor for its conduct and valor between 17 January and 23 April 1941. Two of the Silver Medals of Military Valor were affixed to the 7th Alpini Regiment's flag and added to the regiment's coat of arms. The Silver Medal of Military Valor, which had been awarded to the Alpini Battalion "Val Cismon", was affixed to the flag of the 9th Alpini Regiment's flag and added to that regiment's coat of arms, as the battalion "Val Cismon" had been assigned to the 9th Alpini Regiment as the regiment's third battalion on 27 April 1941.

At the same time the Alpini Battalion "Uork Amba" fought in the East African campaign of World War II, during which it was assigned to the 10th Regiment "Granatieri di Savoia" of the 65th Infantry Division "Granatieri di Savoia". The battalion distinguished itself in the Battle of Keren and then retreated with the remaining Italian forces to Massawa, where the remnants of the battalion surrendered to British forces on 8 April 1941. For its service and sacrifice the battalion was awarded a Silver Medal of Military Valor, which was affixed, together with the Bronze Medal of Military Valor the battalion had been awarded earlier, to the flag of the 7th Alpini Regiment and added to the regiment's coat of arms after World War II had ended.

After the conclusion of the Greco-Italian War and the Invasion of Yugoslavia in April 1941 the "Pusteria" division was sent in July 1941 as occupation force to Pljevlja in Montenegro. Soon the division was embroiled in heavy fighting against Yugoslavian Partisans, which culminated in the Battle of Pljevlja in December 1941. On 15 February 1942, the regiment formed a support weapons company for each of its three battalions. These companies were equipped with Breda M37 machine guns, and 45mm Mod. 35 and 81mm Mod. 35 mortars. The 95th Support Weapons Company was assigned to the Alpini Battalion "Feltre", the 96th Support Weapons Company to the Alpini Battalion "Pieve di Cadore", and the 106th Support Weapons Company to the Alpini Battalion "Belluno".

In August 1942, the division was repatriated, and – after two months of rest – participated in the Axis occupation of Vichy France. Afterwards the "Pusteria" division took up garrison duties in Alpes-Maritimes. After the announcement of the Armistice of Cassibile on 8 September 1943 part of the division surrendered to invading German forces near Gap, while the 7th Alpini Regiment tried to return to the Italian region of Piedmont. However German forces blocked the regiment's path at the Col de Tende pass and the regiment was disbanded by the Germans on 12 September 1943.

=== Cold War ===
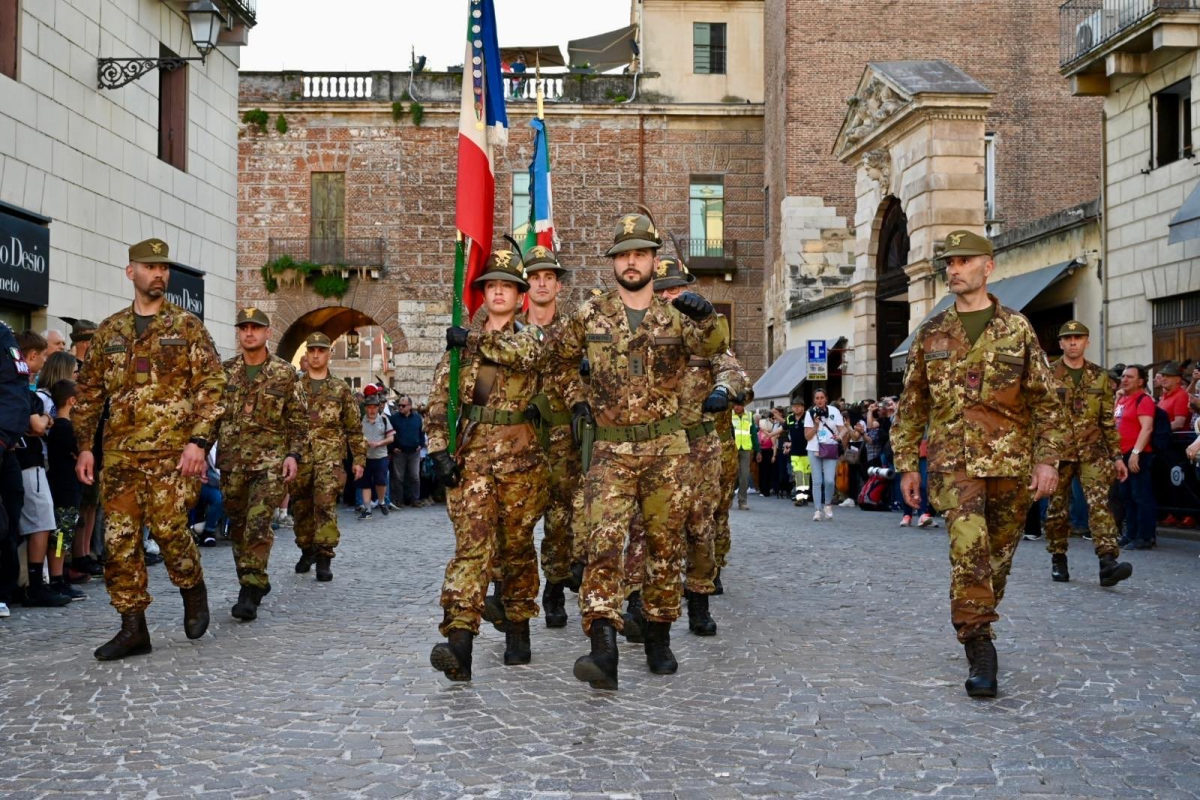
The flag of the 7th Alpini Regiment is paraded through the city of Vicenza during the National Alpini Association gathering on 12 May 2024

On 1 July 1953, the command and the command company of the 7th Alpini Regiment were reformed in Belluno. On 1 September of the same year, the Alpini battalions "Pieve di Cadore" and "Belluno" were reformed in Belluno and assigned to the regiment. On 1 December of the same year, the regiment joined the newly formed Alpine Brigade "Cadore", which also included the 6th Mountain Artillery Regiment. The "Cadore" brigade was tasked with defending the Piave valley. On 31 October 1955, the regiment formed the Recruits Training Battalion "Cadore", which on 1 February 1956 was transferred to the newly formed 12th Recruits Training Center in Montorio Veronese. On 1 June 1956, the Alpini Battalion "Pieve di Cadore" in Feltre was renamed Alpini Battalion "Feltre", so that on 1 October of the same year the Alpini Battalion "Pieve di Cadore" could be reformed in the village of Pieve di Cadore. In 1957 the regiment formed the 7th Mortar Company, which was split on 31 December 1964 to form a mortar company for each of the regiment's three battalions. Afterwards the regiment consisted of the following units:

- 7th Alpini Regiment, in Belluno
  - Command Company, in Belluno
  - Alpini Battalion "Feltre", in Feltre
    - Command and Services Company
    - 64th, 65th, and 66th Alpini Company (65th Alpini Company based in Strigno)
    - 125th Mortar Company
  - Alpini Battalion "Pieve di Cadore", in Pieve di Cadore
    - Command and Services Company
    - 67th, 68th, and 75th Alpini Company
    - 167th Mortar Company
  - Alpini Battalion "Belluno", in Belluno
    - Command and Services Company
    - 77th, 78th, and 79th Alpini Company
    - 116th Mortar Company

In October 1963, the regiment's troops were sent to Longarone to help rescue efforts after the Vajont dam disaster. For its conduct in Longarone the regiment was awarded a Gold Medal of Civil Valor, which was affixed to the regiment's flag and added to the regiment's coat of arms.

During the 1975 army reform the army disbanded the regimental level and newly independent battalions were granted for the first time their own flags. On 21 August 1975, the Alpini Battalion "Belluno" was reorganized as a recruits training battalion. On 11 November 1975, the 7th Alpini Regiment was disbanded and the next day the regiment's three battalions became autonomous units and were assigned to the Alpine Brigade "Cadore". The Alpini battalions "Feltre" and "Pieve di Cadore" consisted now of a command, a command and services company, three Alpini companies, and a heavy mortar company with eight 120mm Mod. 63 mortars. Each of the two Alpini battalions fielded now 950 men (45 officers, 96 non-commissioned officers, and 809 soldiers).

On 12 November 1976 the President of the Italian Republic Giovanni Leone assigned with decree 846 the flag and traditions of the 7th Alpini Regiment to the Alpini Battalion "Feltre", while the Alpini Battalion "Pieve di Cadore" and Alpini Battalion "Belluno" were granted a new flag. At the same time the medals and military honors awarded to the Alpini battalions "Pieve di Cadore" and "Belluno" were transferred from the flag of the 7th Alpini Regiment to the two battalions' flags, while the medals and military honors awarded to the entire regiment were duplicated for the flags of the two battalions.

=== Recent times ===
On 21 August 1992, the Alpini Battalion "Feltre" lost its autonomy and the next day the battalion entered the reformed 7th Alpini Regiment. During the same year the "Cadore" brigade's Anti-Tank Company was disbanded and its personnel, with their TOW anti-tank guided missiles, assigned to the mortar companies of the battalions of the 7th Alpini Regiment and 12th Alpini Regiment. Consequently the regiment's 125th Mortar Company was renamed 125th Support Weapons Company. In November 1994 the regiment was sent to the Province of Asti, which had been inundated by severe floods. For its work in Asti the Italian Red Cross awarded the 7th Alpini Regiment a Bronze Medal of Merit, which was affixed to the regiment's flag.

On 31 January 1997, the Alpine Brigade "Cadore" was disbanded and the next day the 7th Alpini Regiment was assigned to the Alpine Brigade "Julia". In 2001 the 125th Support Weapons Company was split into the 125th Mortar Company and the 269th Anti-tank Company "Val Fella". On 30 November 2004, the 16th Regiment "Belluno" in Belluno was disbanded, and the following year the 7th Alpini Regiment moved from Feltre to Belluno. In 2011, the 269th Anti-tank Company "Val Fella" was disbanded and its personnel integrated into the 125th Mortar Company, which was renamed 125th Maneuver Support Company.

== Organization ==
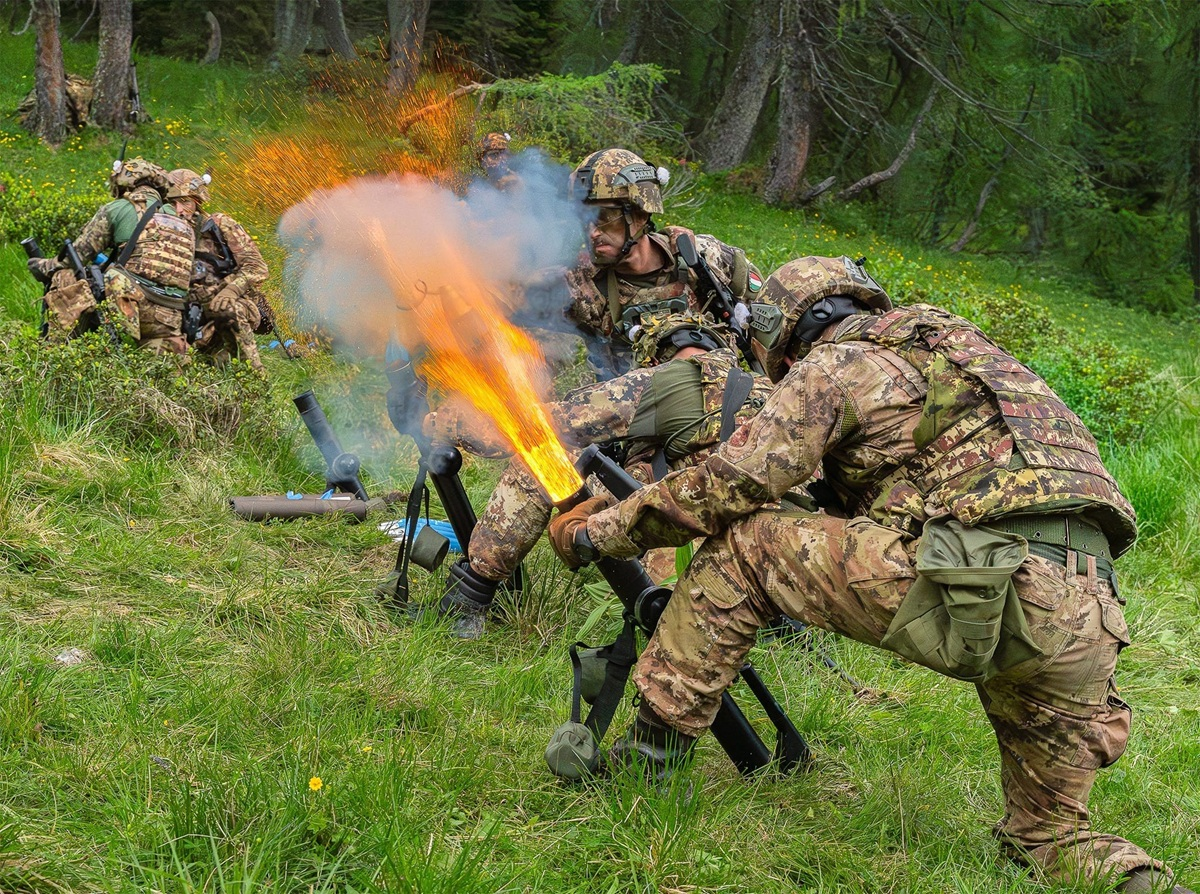
7th Alpini Regiment troops firing 60mm mortars during exercise Alabarda D'argento 2026

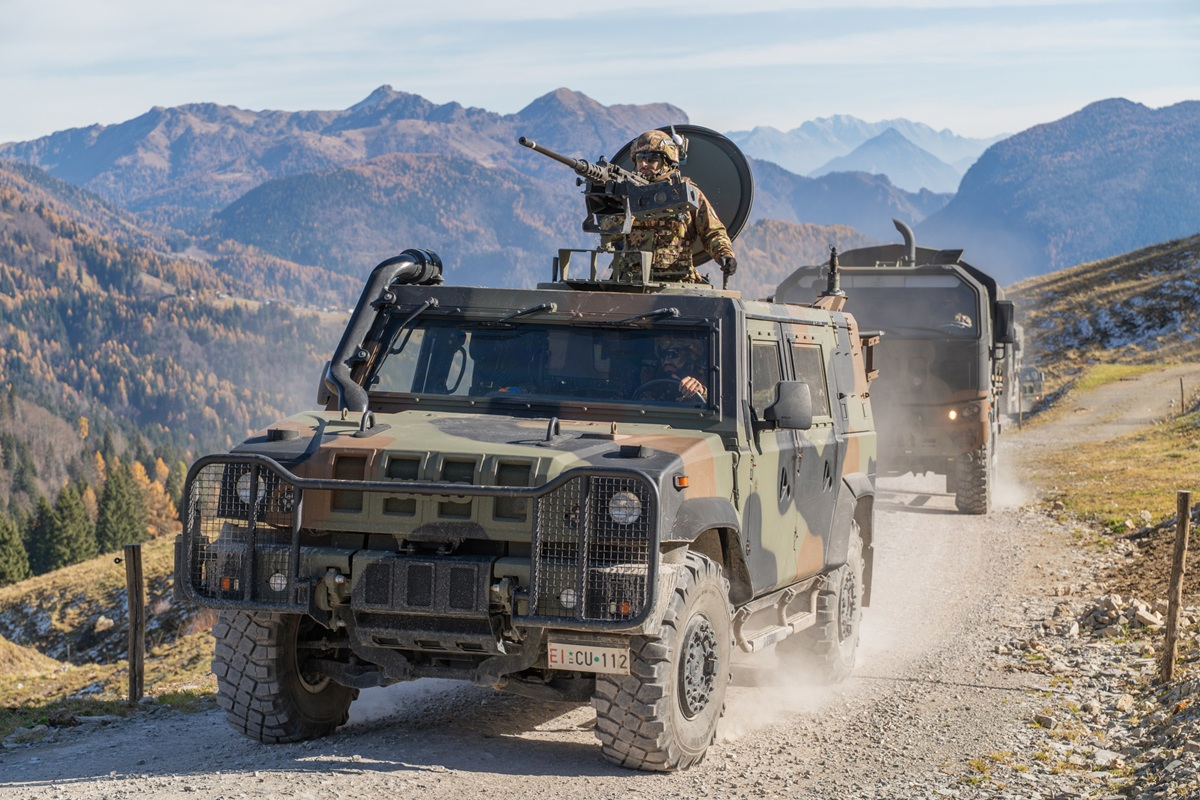
7th Alpini Regiment VTLM Lince leading a supply column during exercise Alabarda d’Argento 11-25

As of 2024 the 7th Alpini Regiment is organized as follows:

- 7th Alpini Regiment, in Belluno
  - Command and Logistic Support Company
  - Alpini Battalion "Feltre"
    - 64th Alpini Company
    - 65th Alpini Company
    - 66th Alpini Company
    - 125th Maneuver Support Company

The Alpini companies are equipped with Bv 206S tracked all-terrain carriers and Lince light multirole vehicles. The maneuver support company is equipped with 120 mm mortars and Spike MR anti-tank guided missiles.

== See also ==
- Alpine Brigade "Julia"
