= Rapale, Italy =

Coordinates: 43°22′N 11°35′E

Rapale
- Frazione
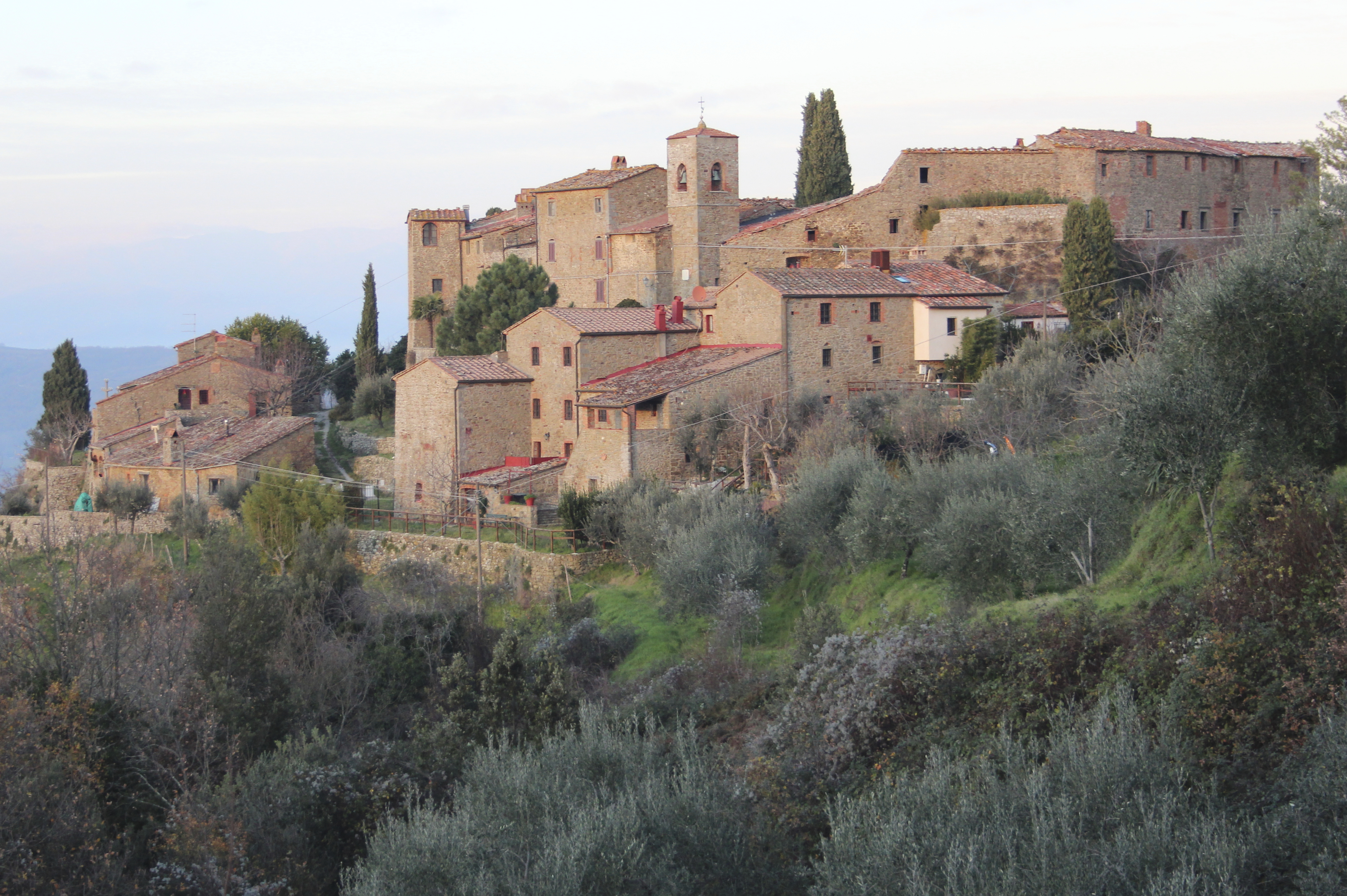

- Location of Rapale in Italy
- Country: Italy
- Region: Tuscany
- Province: Arezzo
- Comune: Bucine
- Time zone: UTC+1 (CET)
  - Summer (DST): UTC+2 (CEST)

Rapale is a village located in south-western Arezzo within the municipality of Bucine in Tuscany, Italy.

== Geography ==
Rapale is located near the province of Siena in Tuscany, Italy. The village is part of the municipality of Bucine in south-western Arezzo.

The Pratomagno is a mountain range which has the Arno river on both sides: to the west is the upper Valdarno and to the east is the Casentino. It lies north-west of the city of Arezzo, in Tuscany, Italy.

Grain, tobacco, and Chianti grapes are harvested during the autumn harvest.

== Festivals and celebrations ==
=== Calici di Stelle ===
Calici di Stelle, known as Chalices of Stars is a yearly celebration of the nightly sky above Rapale and its telescopic observation. Calici di Stelle is a traditional summer event created by Movimento Turismo del Vino that, singing the praises of Bacchus, one of the most fascinating nights of the year, offers tourists the chance to enjoy "the rain of tears of St. Lawrence" in the company of a quality wine.

On August 10 of each year, in city centers and in the Italian squares, including courts of unexpected beauty and castles, lovers of good drinking wine lovers can taste the best wines from member wineries combined with typical quality products, an expression of local heritage each region hosting the event.

The Shooting Stars event combines wine tastings led by sommeliers and Italian winemakers with a programme of cultural activities, including jazz and classical music concerts, historical parades, theatrical performances, and traditional games. The event attracts Italian and international tourists visiting the city's cultural and historical attractions.
