= 12th Alpini Regiment =

Inactive Italian Army mountain infantry unit

- 12° Reggimento Alpini
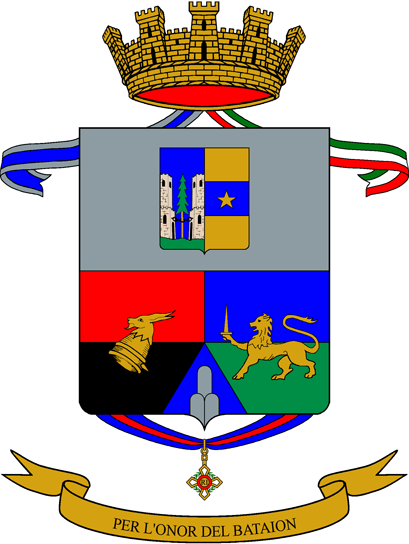
- Regimental coat of arms
- Active: 15 Feb. 1936 – 24 April 1937; 11 Nov. 1975 – 31 Jan. 1997
- Country: Italy
- Branch: Italian Army
- Type: Mountain Infantry
- Part of: Alpine Brigade "Cadore"
- Garrison/HQ: Pieve di Cadore
- Motto: "Per l'onor del bataion"
- Anniversaries: 23 April 1941
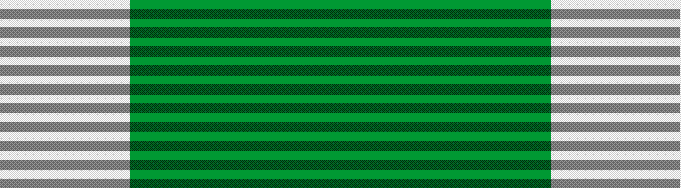
- Decorations: 1× Military Order of Italy; 1× Silver Medal of Military Valor; 1× Gold Medal of Civil Valor; 1× Silver Medal of Merit

Insignia
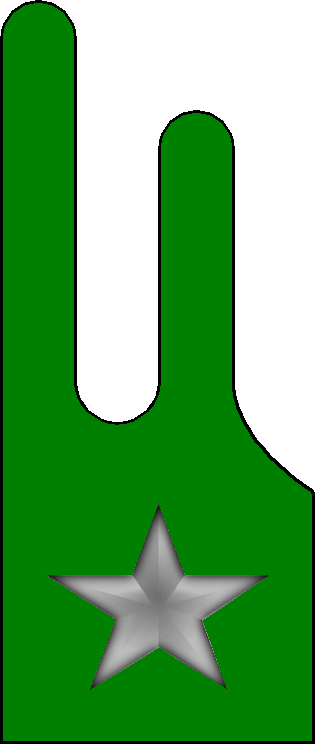
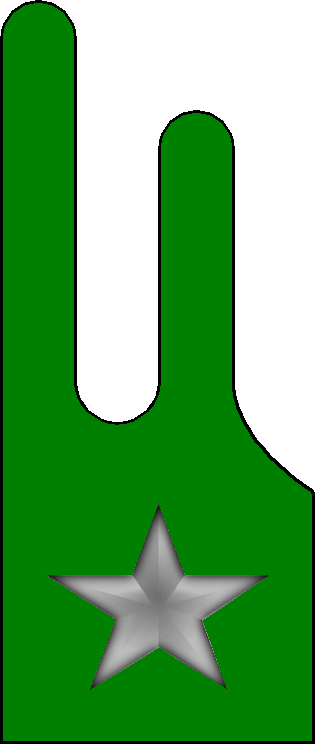
- Alpini gorget patches

The 12th Alpini Regiment (Italian: 12° Reggimento Alpini) is an inactive mountain warfare regiment of the Italian Army last based in Pieve di Cadore in Veneto. The regiment belongs to the Italian Army's Alpini infantry speciality and was assigned to the Alpine Brigade "Cadore". The regiment was formed in 1992 and consisted of the Alpini Battalion "Pieve di Cadore", whose flag and traditions it inherited.

The Alpini Battalion "Pieve di Cadore" was formed in 1886 and assigned to the 7th Alpini Regiment. During World War I the battalion fought in the alpine areas of the Italian front. On 15 February 1936, the 12th Alpini Regiment was formed for the first time as a temporary unit, tasked with overseeing the Alpini battalions "Pieve di Cadore" and "Belluno" of the 7th Alpini Regiment, as the latter had deployed, together with the Alpini Battalion "Feltre", to Eritrea for the Second Italo-Ethiopian War. After the return of the 7th Alpini Regiment to Italy the 12th Alpini Regiment was disbanded on 24 April 1937. In World War II the battalion fought in the invasion of France and the Greco-Italian War. On 8 September 1943, the Armistice of Cassibile was announced and four days later, on 12 September 1943, invading German forces disbanded the 7th Alpini Regiment and its battalions.

The battalion was reformed in 1953 and assigned to the 7th Alpini Regiment. In 1975, the 7th Alpini Regiment was disbanded and the "Pieve di Cadore" battalion became an autonomous unit, which in 1976 was granted its own flag. The battalion was assigned to the Alpine Brigade "Cadore". In 1992, the battalion entered the newly created 12th Alpini Regiment. In 1995, the regiment was reduced to a reserve unit. In 1997, the "Cadore" brigade and the 12th Alpini Regiment were disbanded. The regiment's anniversary falls on 23 April 1941, the last day of the Greco-Italian War, during which the Alpini Battalion "Pieve di Cadore" earned a Silver Medal of Military Valor.

== History ==
On 1 November 1886, the Royal Italian Army's Alpini battalions changed their names from their recruiting zones to the cities and towns, where their base was located. At the same time Alpini soldiers and non-commissioned officers were issued thread tufts, called Nappina in Italian, which were clipped to the Cappello Alpino headdress, and colored white for the troops of a regiment's first battalion, red for the troops of a regiment's second battalion, green for the troops of a regiment's third battalion, and blue for the troops of a regiment's fourth battalion. On the same day the 6th Alpini Regiment's Battalion "Cadore", which consisted of the 65th, 66th, 67th, and 68th companies and was based in Pieve di Cadore, was renamed Alpini Battalion "Pieve di Cadore". Furthermore on the same day, 1 November 1886, the 6th Alpini Regiment formed the Alpini Battalion "Feltre", for which the Alpini Battalion "Pieve di Cadore" ceded its 65th and 66th Alpini companies. As replacement the "Pieve di Cadore" battalion received the newly formed 75th Alpini Company. As the regiment's second battalion the "Pieve di Cadore" battalion's troops received a red Nappina. The battalion's recruiting area was the Cadore in the upper Piave valley.

As the 6th Alpini Regiment had become too complex to administer it was divided on 1 August 1887 into the 6th Alpini Regiment and 7th Alpini Regiment. The latter was formed in Conegliano with the regimental command of the 6th Alpini Regiment and the battalions "Feltre", "Pieve di Cadore" and "Gemona". In December 1908, the 7th Alpini Regiment was deployed to the area of the Strait of Messina for the recovery efforts after the 1908 Messina earthquake. For its service the regiment was awarded a Silver Medal of Merit, which was affixed to the regiment's flag.

=== World War I ===
At the outbreak of World War I Italy declared its neutrality. In the autumn of 1914 the eight Alpini regiments formed 38 additional Alpini companies with men, who had completed their military service in the preceding four years. These companies were numbered from 80th to 117th and assigned to the existing Alpini battalions. The "Pieve di Cadore" battalion formed the 96th Alpini Company, and then consisted of four companies. In January 1915, each Alpini battalion began with the formation of a reserve battalion, with men, who had completed their military service at least four years, but not more than eleven years prior. These reserve battalions were named for a valley (Italian: Valle; abbreviated Val) located near their associated regular Alpini battalion's base, and the reserve battalions received the same Nappina as their associated regular Alpini battalion. The "Pieve di Cadore" battalion formed the Alpini Battalion "Val Piave", which consisted of the 267th, 268th, and 275th Alpini Company.

On 23 May 1915, Italy declared war on Austro-Hungary and the Alpini Battalion "Pieve di Cadore" occupied positions in the Dolomites near the Tre Cime di Lavaredo, on Monte Cavallino, and on Monte Piana. As the mountainous terrain of the Italian front made the deployment of entire Alpini regiments impracticable the Alpini battalions were employed either independently or assigned to groups, groupings, or infantry divisions as needed. By the end of 1915 the Alpini regiments began to form additional companies with recruits born in 1896. These new companies were numbered from 118th to 157th and were used, together with the 38 companies formed earlier, to form an additional reserve battalion for each regular battalion. These new battalions were named for a mountain (Italian: Monte) located near their associated regular Alpini battalion's base, and the reserve battalions received the same Nappina as their associated regular Alpini battalion. In December 1915, the Alpini Battalion "Pieve di Cadore" ceded the 96th Alpini Company to the newly formed Alpini Battalion "Monte Antelao", which also included the 150th and 151st Alpini Company.

In 1916 the Alpini Battalion "Pieve di Cadore" was deployed until May in the sector of the Tre Cime di Lavaredo and then in June on Monte Cristallo. From July until the end of the year the battalion fought in the Tofane group. In January 1917, the battalion was sent to the Val Costeana, before it moved in August to the Isonzo front for the Eleventh Battle of the Isonzo, during which the battalion fought at Mešnjak. From October 1917 to August 1918, the battalion held positions on Monte Altissimo di Nago. In October–November 1918, during the decisive Battle of Vittorio Veneto, the battalion was on Monte Valderoa, from where it advanced to Feltre.

=== Interwar years ===
After the end of the war the Valle and Monte battalions were disbanded. On 27 October 1934, the III Alpine Brigade was renamed III Superior Alpine Command. In December of the same year the command was given the name "Julio". On 31 October 1935, the III Superior Alpine Command "Julio" was reorganized as 3rd Alpine Division "Julia", which included the 7th Alpini Regiment, 8th Alpini Regiment, 9th Alpini Regiment, and 3rd Alpine Artillery Regiment "Julia".

On 22 December 1935, the 7th Alpini Regiment was mobilized for the Second Italo-Ethiopian War. On the same date the regiment received the Alpini Battalion "Pieve di Teco" from the 1st Alpini Regiment and the Alpini Battalion "Exilles" from the 3rd Alpini Regiment. On 31 December of the same year, the 7th Alpini Regiment, which now consisted of the Alpini Battalions "Feltre", "Pieve di Teco", and "Exilles", was assigned to the newly formed 5th Alpine Division "Pusteria", which also included the newly formed 11th Alpini Regiment and 5th Alpine Artillery Regiment "Pusteria". On 6 January 1936 the "Pusteria" division's units embarked in Livorno and Naples for the transfer to Massawa in Eritrea.

On 15 February 1936, the 7th Alpini Regiment's depot in Belluno formed the command of the 12th Alpini Regiment, which took command of 7th Alpini Regiment's battalions "Pieve di Cadore" and "Belluno", which had remained in Italy. In April 1937, the "Pusteria" division returned to Italy and the 7th Alpini Regiment returned to Belluno, while the Alpini battalions "Pieve di Teco" and "Exilles" returned to their respective regiments. On 24 April of the same year, the 12th Alpini Regiment was disbanded and the battalions "Pieve di Cadore" and "Belluno" returned to the 7th Alpini Regiment.

=== World War II ===
On 10 June 1940, Italy entered World War II and the Alpini Battalion "Pieve di Cadore", which consisted of a command company, and the 67th, 68th, and 75th Alpini companies, participated, together with the rest of the 7th Alpini Regiment, in the invasion of France.

In November 1940, the 5th Alpine Division "Pusteria" was transferred to Albania to shore up the crumbling Italian front during the Greco-Italian War. By late November 1940, the 7th Alpini Regiment entered the front in the Berat sector. In December 1940, the regiment suffered heavy losses in the Greek counter-offensive. The regiment was forced to retreat into Albania, where it continued to fight and suffered further heavy losses. The regiment remained at the frontline in Albania until the German invasion of Greece in April 1941. The "Pusteria" division then pursued the retreating Greek forces. For their conduct and service on the Greek front between 24 November 1940 and 23 April 1941 the Alpini battalions "Feltre" and "Pieve di Cadore" were awarded a shared Silver Medal of Military Valor, which was affixed to the 7th Alpini Regiment's flag and added to the regiment's coat of arms.

After the conclusion of the Greco-Italian War and the Invasion of Yugoslavia in April 1941 the "Pusteria" division was sent in July 1941 as occupation force to Pljevlja in Montenegro. Soon the division was embroiled in heavy fighting against Yugoslavian Partisans, which culminated in the Battle of Pljevlja in December 1941. On 15 February 1942, the regiment formed a support weapons company for each of its three battalions and the Alpini Battalion "Pieve di Cadore" received the 96th Support Weapons Company. These companies were equipped with Breda M37 machine guns, and 45mm Mod. 35 and 81mm Mod. 35 mortars.

In August 1942, the division was repatriated, and – after two months of rest – participated in the Axis occupation of Vichy France. Afterwards the "Pusteria" division took up garrison duties in Alpes-Maritimes. After the announcement of the Armistice of Cassibile on 8 September 1943 part of the division surrendered to invading German forces near Gap, while the 7th Alpini Regiment tried to return to the Italian region of Piedmont. However German forces blocked the regiment's path at the Col de Tende pass and the regiment was disbanded by the Germans on 12 September 1943.

=== Cold War ===
On 1 July 1953, the command and the command company of the 7th Alpini Regiment were reformed in Belluno. On 1 September of the same year, the Alpini battalions "Pieve di Cadore" and "Belluno" were reformed in Belluno and assigned to the regiment. On 1 December of the same year, the regiment joined the newly formed Alpine Brigade "Cadore", which also included the 6th Mountain Artillery Regiment. The "Cadore" brigade was tasked with defending the Piave valley. On 1 June 1956, the Alpini Battalion "Pieve di Cadore" in Feltre was renamed Alpini Battalion "Feltre", so that on 1 October of the same year the Alpini Battalion "Pieve di Cadore" could be reformed in the village of Pieve di Cadore. In 1957 the regiment formed the 7th Mortar Company, which was split on 31 December 1964 to form a mortar company for each of the regiment's three battalions. Afterwards the Alpini Battalion "Belluno" consisted of the following units:

- Alpini Battalion "Pieve di Cadore", in Pieve di Cadore
  - Command and Services Company
  - 67th, 68th, and 75th Alpini Company
  - 167th Mortar Company

In October 1963, the 7th Alpini Regiment's troops were sent to Longarone to help rescue efforts after the Vajont dam disaster. For its conduct in Longarone the regiment was awarded a Gold Medal of Civil Valor, which was affixed to the regiment's flag and added to the regiment's coat of arms.

During the 1975 army reform the army disbanded the regimental level and newly independent battalions were granted for the first time their own flags. On 11 November 1975, the 7th Alpini Regiment was disbanded and the next day the regiment's three battalions became autonomous units and were assigned to the Alpine Brigade "Orobica". On 12 November 1976 the President of the Italian Republic Giovanni Leone granted the Alpini Battalion "Pieve di Cadore" a new flag. At the same time the medals and military honors awarded to the "Pieve di Cadore" battalion were transferred from the flag of the 7th Alpini Regiment to the battalion's flag, while the medals and military honors awarded to the entire regiment were duplicated for the flag of the battalion. Consequently, the "Pieve di Cadore" battalion's flag was decorated with one Military Order of Italy, one Silver Medal of Military Valor, one Gold Medal of Civil Valor, and one Silver Medal of Merit. The first three awards were also added to the battalion's newly created coat of arms.

=== Recent times ===
On 7 August 1992, the Alpini Battalion "Pieve di Cadore" lost its autonomy and the next day the battalion entered the newly formed 12th Alpini Regiment, which inherited the "Belluno" battalion's flag, traditions, honors and coat of arms. During the same year the "Cadore" brigade's Anti-Tank Company was disbanded and its personnel, with their TOW anti-tank guided missiles, assigned to the mortar companies of the battalions of the 7th Alpini Regiment and 12th Alpini Regiment. Consequently the regiment's 167th Mortar Company was renamed 167th Support Weapons Company.

On 22 October 1995, the regiment was reduced to a reserve unit, which consisted of a Command and Logistic Support Platoon and the 67th Alpini Company. On 31 January 1997, the Alpine Brigade "Cadore" and 12th Alpini Regiment were disbanded, and on the following 26 February the regiment's flag was transferred to the Shrine of the Flags in the Vittoriano in Rome.

== Organization ==
When the 12th Alpini Regiment was disbanded it had the following structure:

- 12th Alpini Regiment, in Pieve di Cadore
  - Command and Logistic Support Company (Command and Logistic Support Platoon 1995–97))
  - Alpini Battalion "Pieve di Cadore"
    - 67th Alpini Company
    - 68th Alpini Company (reserve unit 1995–97)
    - 75th Alpini Company (reserve unit 1995–97)
    - 167th Support Weapons Company (reserve unit 1995–97)
