= Monte Piana =

Mountain in Italy

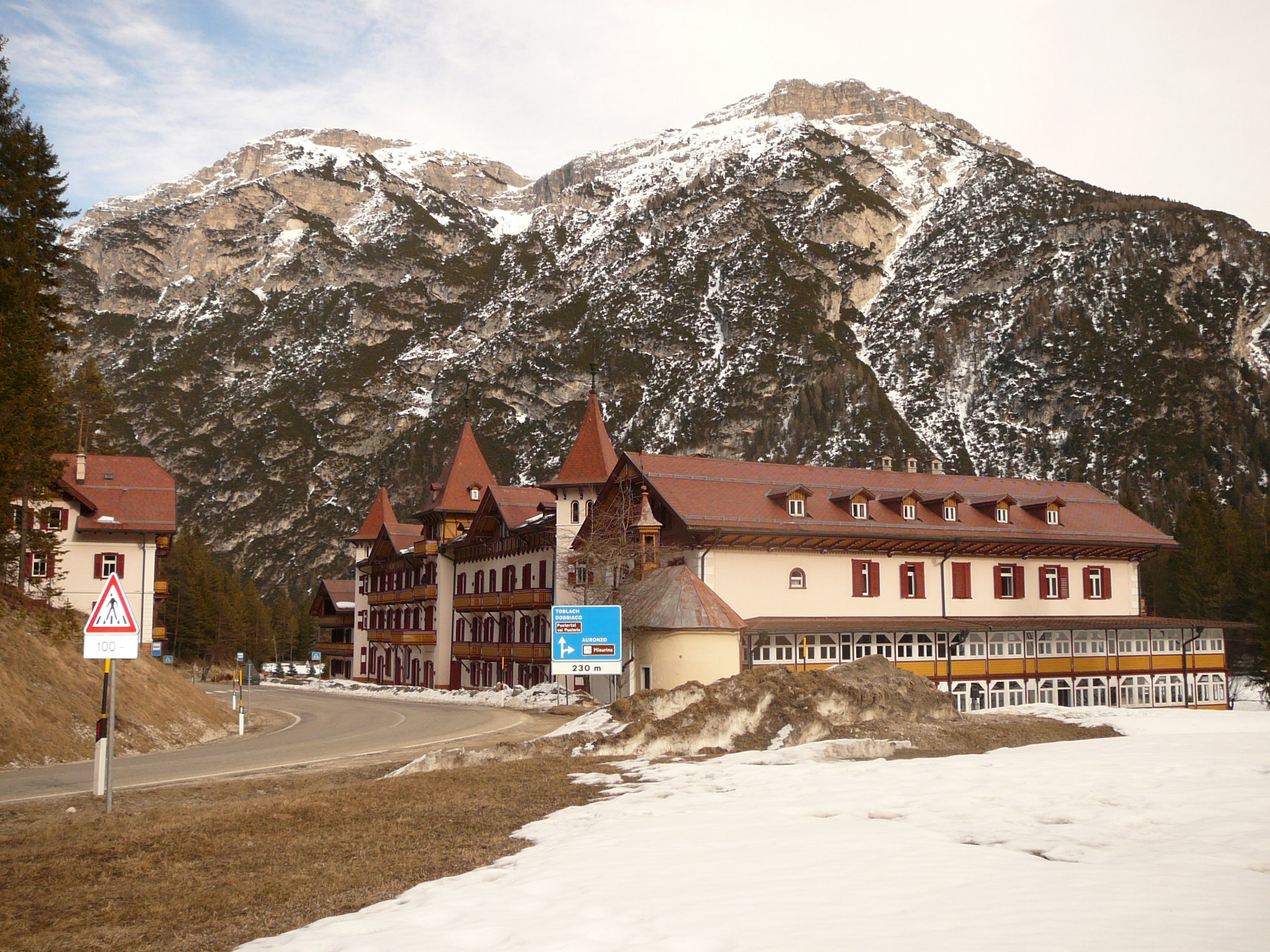
- Southern flank of Monte Piana

Highest point
- Elevation: 2,324 m (7,625 ft)
- Coordinates: 46°36′55″N 12°14′45″E

Geography
- Location within Alps Location within Italy
- Location: South Tyrol and Province of Belluno, Italy
- Parent range: Dolomites

Monte Piana is a 2,324-metre (7,625 ft) mountain in the Sexten Dolomites, on the border between the provinces of South Tyrol and Belluno. The smaller northern summit is named Monte Piano (2,305 m).

During the White War in World War I, the mountain was heavily contested between the Austro-Hungarian and Italian armies. The Austrians held the northern summit, Monte Piano, while the Italians held the southern summit, Monte Piana. Many remnants of the fighting can still be found on both summits today.

== History ==
When Italy declared war on Austria-Hungary on 24 May 1915, seven or eight battalions of the thirty-five Royal Italian Army battalions stationed between Innichen and the Stelvio Pass were sent to Monte Piana and its valleys. Monte Piana fell within the operational sector of the IV Army, commanded by Lieutenant General Luigi Nava, whose forces were divided into two sectors: Cordevole and Cadore. The Cordevole sector belonged to the IX Corps; the Cadore sector, which included Monte Piana, was under the 1st Army Corps commanded by Lieutenant General Ottavio Ragni. On 24 May, the summit was occupied by two platoons of Alpini from the 96th company of Alpini Battalion "Pieve di Cadore", part of the 7th Alpini Regiment. Other Alpini of the 67th company were struck by an artillery shell fired from Monte Rudo at around 08:30, while working on the road from Misurina to Monte Piana; they were among the first Italian casualties on a mountain that claimed roughly 14,000 victims from both sides over less than two years. On 7 June 1915, second lieutenant Antonio De Toni (7th regiment, 268th company, Bn. Val Piave) was fatally wounded, the first member of the Padua university community to be killed in the conflict.

Despite two years of fighting, neither side achieved a decisive result; both forces held their positions without managing to dislodge the other. On 3 November 1917, the Italian units abandoned their positions on the mountain and withdrew to the Grappa line in an attempt to contain the Austro-Hungarian offensive at Caporetto.

Between 1977 and 1981, on the initiative of Austrian Colonel Walther Schaumann, the "Open-Air Historical Museum of Monte Piana" was established. It is open to all visitors free of charge. The restoration of the trenches was carried out by the group "Friends of the Dolomites" (Dolomitenfreunde), which reconstructed the walkways, trenches, tunnels, and stairways of the wartime period. Since 1983, restoration work on the trenches has been carried out during the first two weeks of August by the "Monte Piana Foundation" and the "Friends of the Dolomites", who formed the "Gruppo Volontari Amici del Piana" for this purpose.

In 1981, at the customary gathering on the first Sunday of September dedicated to commemorating the fallen of Monte Piana, the "Friends of the Dolomites" transferred stewardship of the open-air museum to the "Monte Piana Foundation". In 1983, the newly established "Gruppo Volontari Amici del Piana" began systematic maintenance work on elements damaged each year by bad weather and the spring thaw.

Since then, the volunteers have reconstructed collapsed sections of dry-stone wall, salvaged the remains of old shelters, restored wooden structures, and cleared the mountain of waste, in keeping with its status as a protected area. The access paths from the surrounding valleys are maintained and signposted, currently with the assistance of retired colonel Elio Scarpa.

In 1986, the group dedicated its name to Elio Scarpa, its recently deceased vice-president, in recognition of his role in making the initiative possible. The Italian army, through the Alpine Troops Command, has also supported the work, providing the volunteer group with an off-road vehicle, tents, materials, and military personnel during the annual work periods.

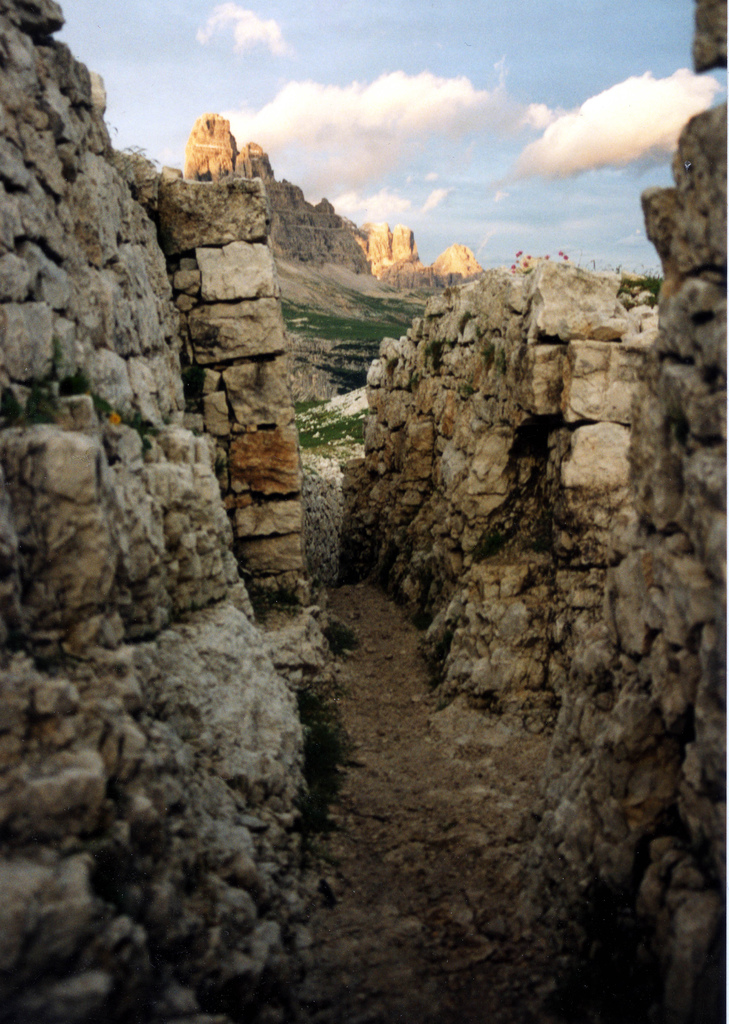
Italian World War I trenches on Monte Piana, looking towards the Tre Cime di Lavaredo.

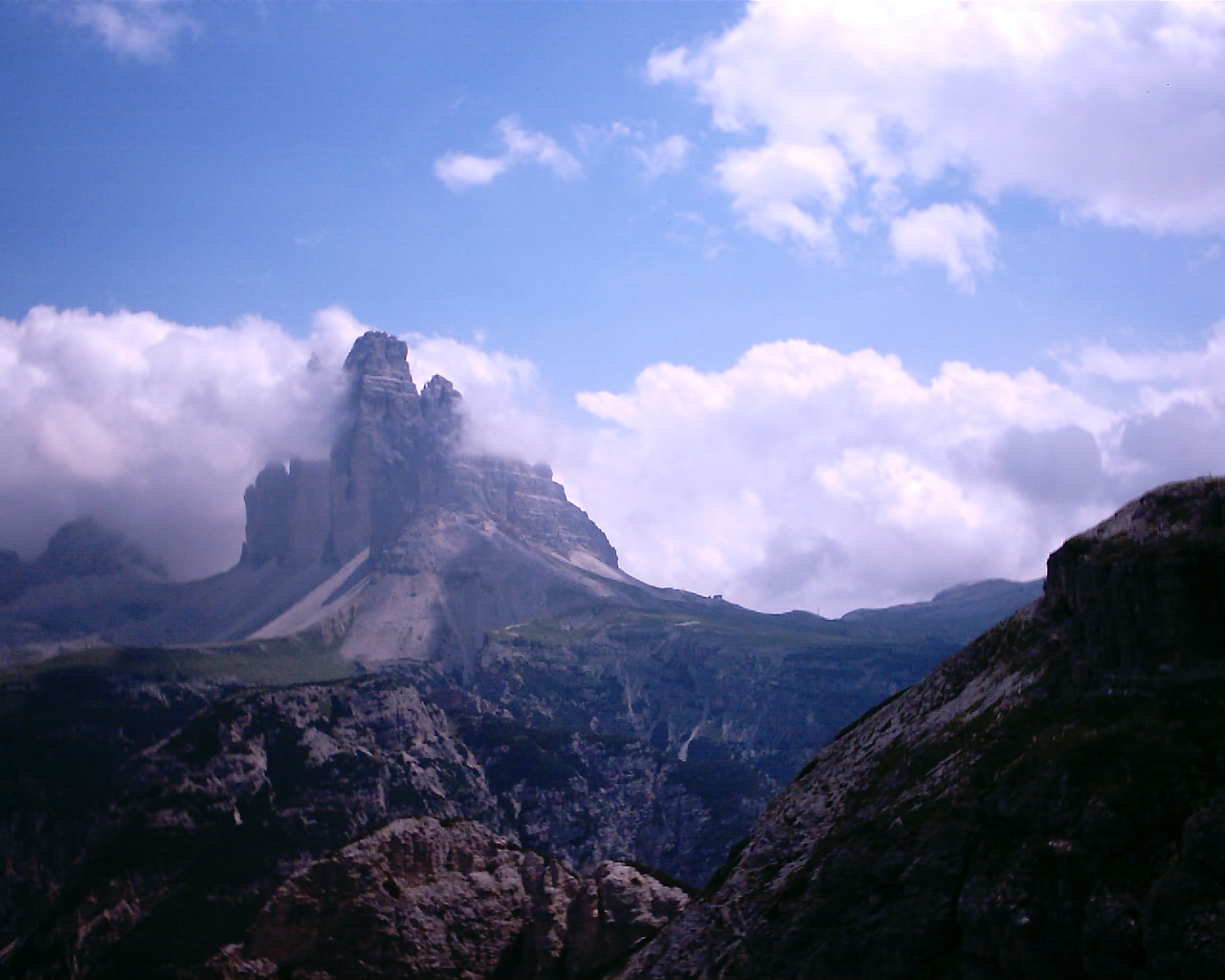
View of the Tre Cime di Lavaredo from Monte Piana.

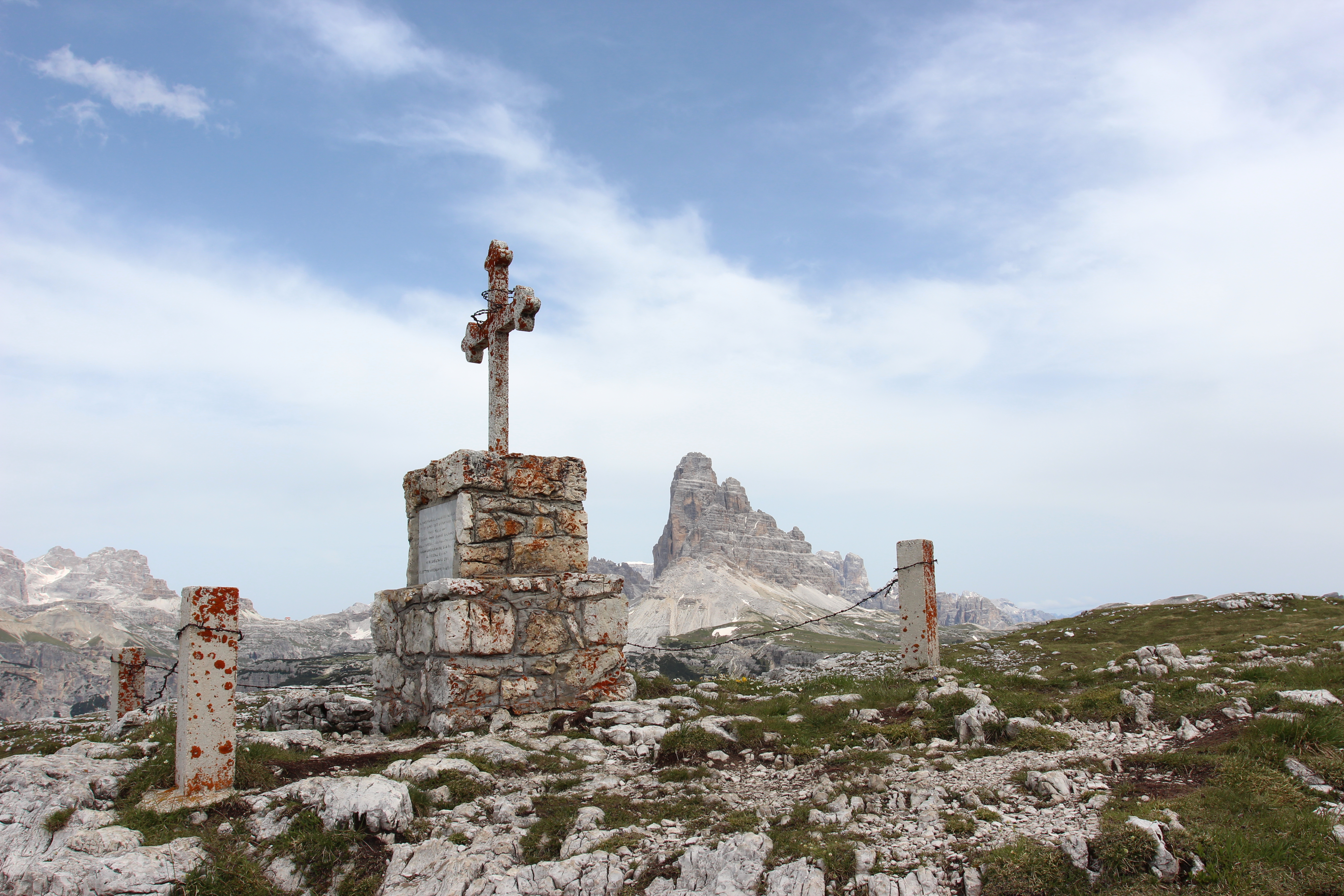
Cross on Monte Piana.
