= Tuori =

- Frazione
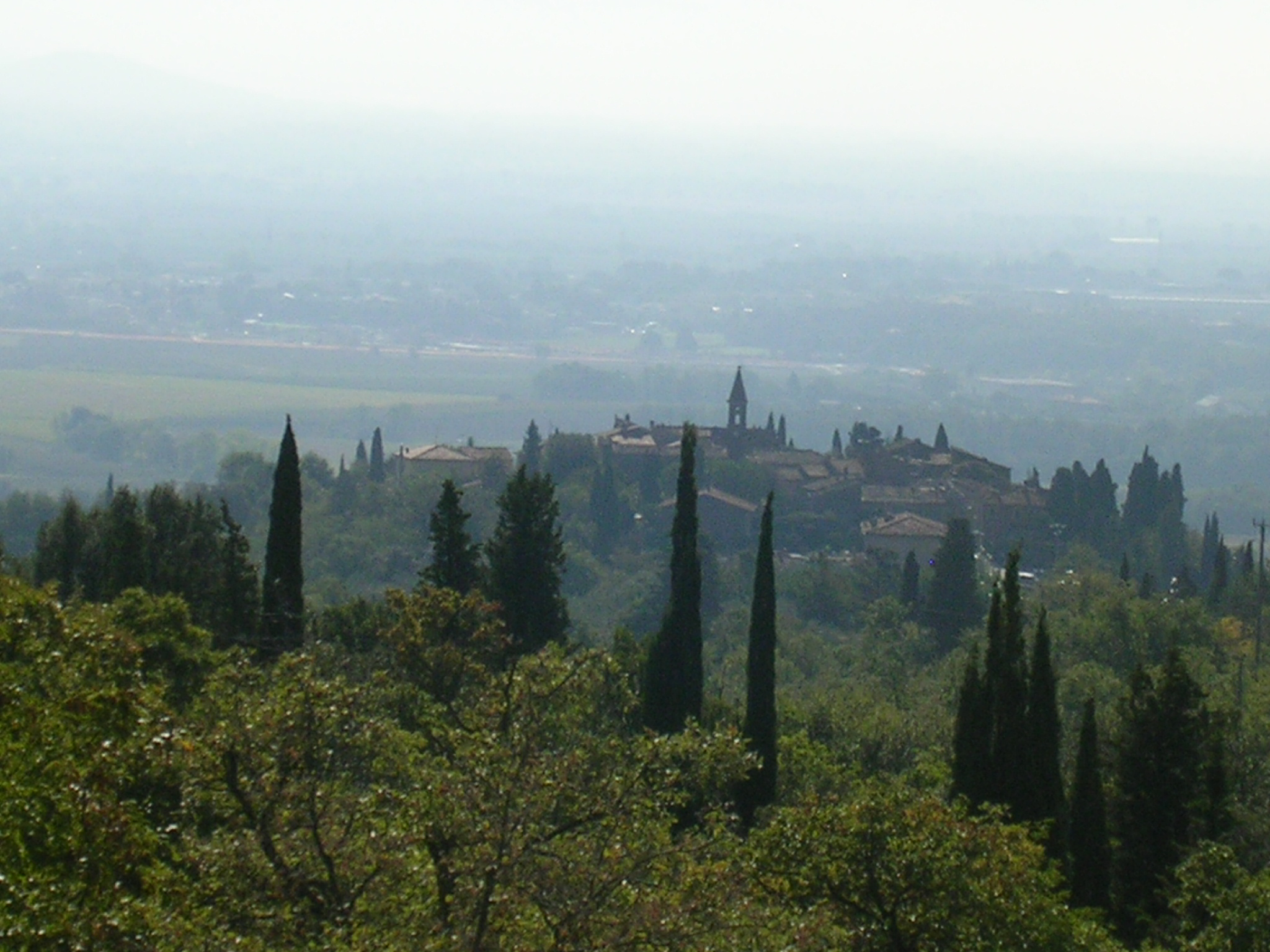

- Location of Tuori in Italy
- Coordinates: 43°26′N 11°46′E
- Country: Italy
- Region: Tuscany
- Province: Province of Arezzo (AR)
- Comune: Civitella in Val di Chiana
- Elevation: 333 m (1,093 ft)
- Demonym: Tuoresi
- Time zone: UTC+1 (CET)
  - Summer (DST): UTC+2 (CEST)
- Postal code: 52041
- Dialing code: 0575
- Saint day: April 23
- Website: Official website

Tuori is a frazione of Civitella in Val di Chiana in the province of Arezzo, Tuscany, Italy with an area of 0.08162 square kilometres (0.03151 sq mi). In 2021, the population was 129 people.
