= Bucine =

Municipality in Tuscany, Italy

- Comune
- Comune di Bucine
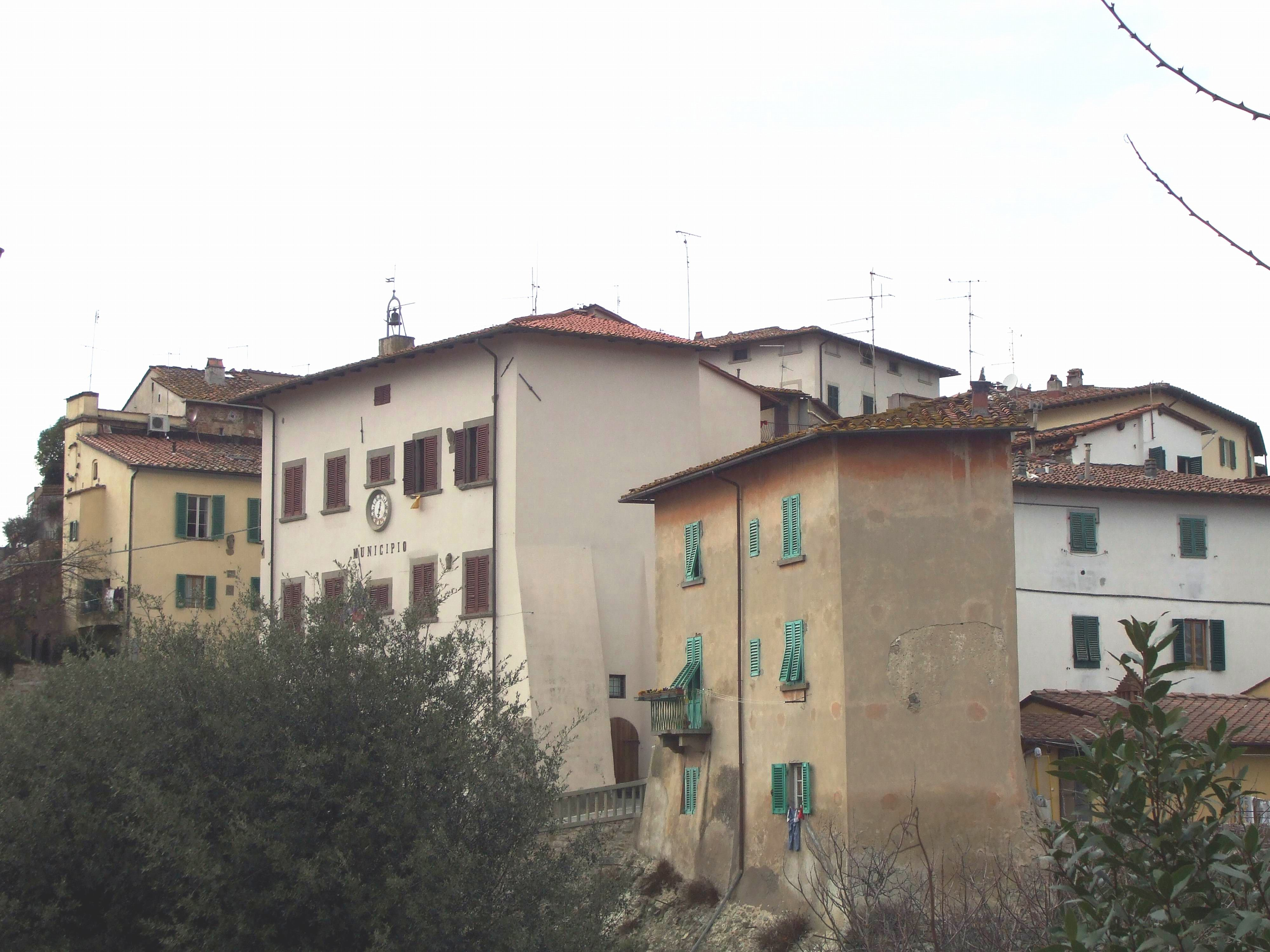
- View of Bucine

- Coat of arms

- Location within Italy Location within Tuscany
- Coordinates: 43°29′N 11°37′E
- Country: Italy
- Region: Tuscany
- Province: Arezzo (AR)
- Frazioni: Ambra, Badia Agnano, Badia a Roti, Capannole, Castiglione Alberti, Cennina, Duddova, Galatrona, Gavignano, I Tribbi, La Villa, Levane, Lupinari, Mercatale Valdarno, Montaltuzzo, Montebenichi, Perelli, Pietraviva, Pogi, Ponticelli, Rapale, San Leolino, San Martino in Valdambra, San Pancrazio, Sogna, Solata, Tontenano, Torre, Vepri

Government
  - Mayor: Paolo Nannini

Area
  - Total: 131.08 km^{2} (50.61 sq mi)
- Elevation: 207 m (679 ft)

Population (30 April 2017)
  - Total: 10,105
  - Density: 77.090/km^{2} (199.66/sq mi)
- Demonym: Bucinesi
- Time zone: UTC+1 (CET)
  - Summer (DST): UTC+2 (CEST)
- Postal code: 52021
- Dialing code: 055
- Website: Official website

Bucine (Italian pronunciation: [ˈbuːt͡ʃine]) is a comune (municipality) in the Province of Arezzo in the Italian region Tuscany, located about 45 kilometres (28 mi) southeast of Florence and about 20 kilometres (12 mi) west of Arezzo.

== Subdivision ==
Bucine borders the municipalities of Castelnuovo Berardenga, Civitella in Val di Chiana, Gaiole in Chianti, Monte San Savino, Montevarchi, Pergine Valdarno, and Rapolano Terme. Although the town of Bucine is limited in extent, the municipality includes numerous small villages, including, among others, Ambra, Badia Agnano, Badia a Roti, Capannole, Cennina, Levane, Mercatale-Torre, Montebenichi, Pietraviva, Pogi, Rapale, San Leolino, and San Pancrazio.

== Economy ==
Valentino Shoes Lab, a factory of the fashion brand Valentino, is located in Bucine. The factory was destroyed by fire between 1 and 2 April 2021.

== Main sights ==
Many buildings of high historic value are present within the borders of the municipality, but the most important ones are:

- Chiesa di San Giovanni Battista (1518)
- Chiesa della Madonna del San Salvatore (probably 13th century)
- Circolo MCL (1901)
