= San Pancrazio, Arezzo =

Village in Arezzo, Italy

San Pancrazio is a hamlet in the Municipality of Bucine, in the province of Arezzo in central Tuscany. The village has a population of around 200 inhabitants, increasing in summer due to holidaymakers.

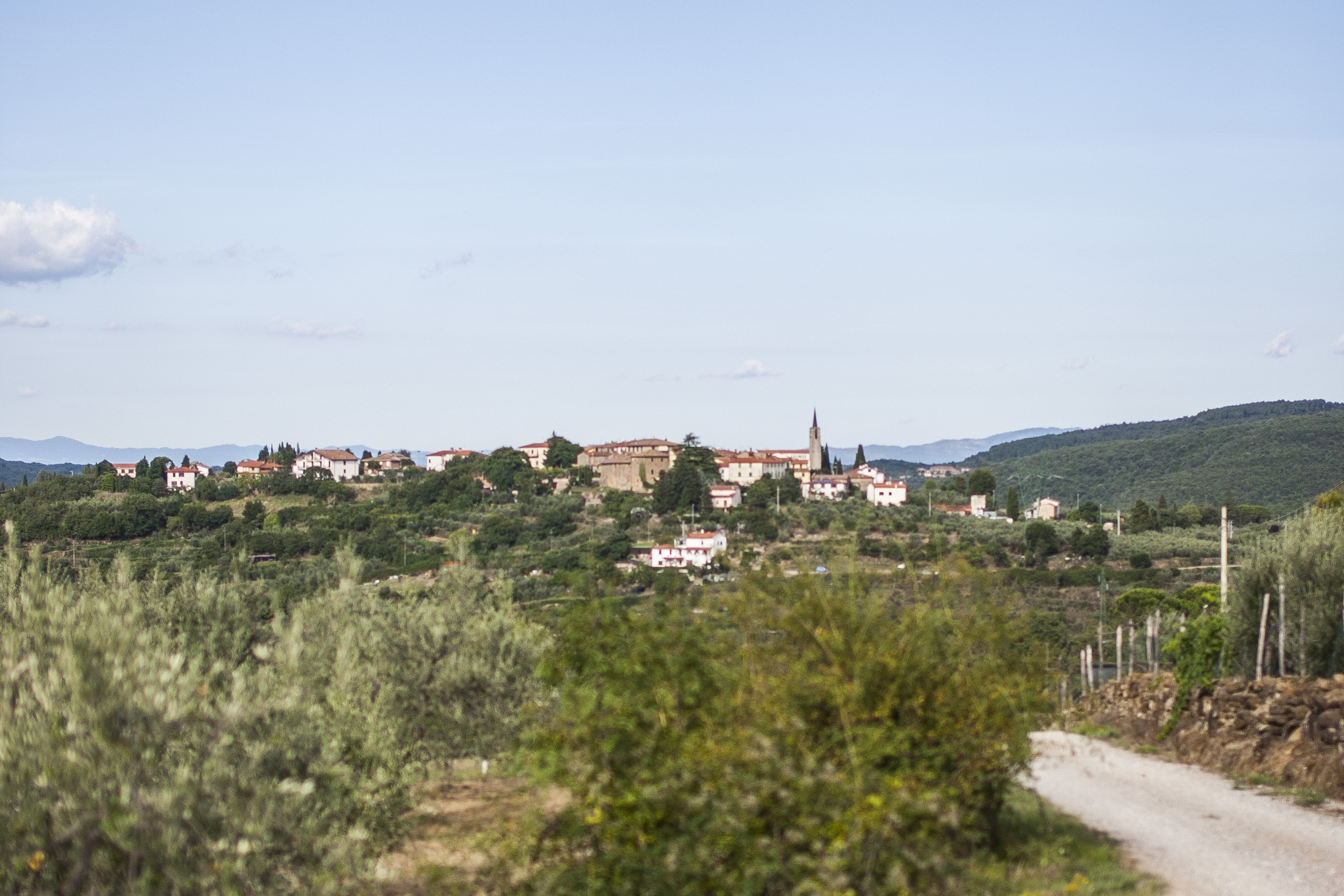
The village seen from the Poggio all'Olmo hill, the Podestà is the stone building in the middle of the photo

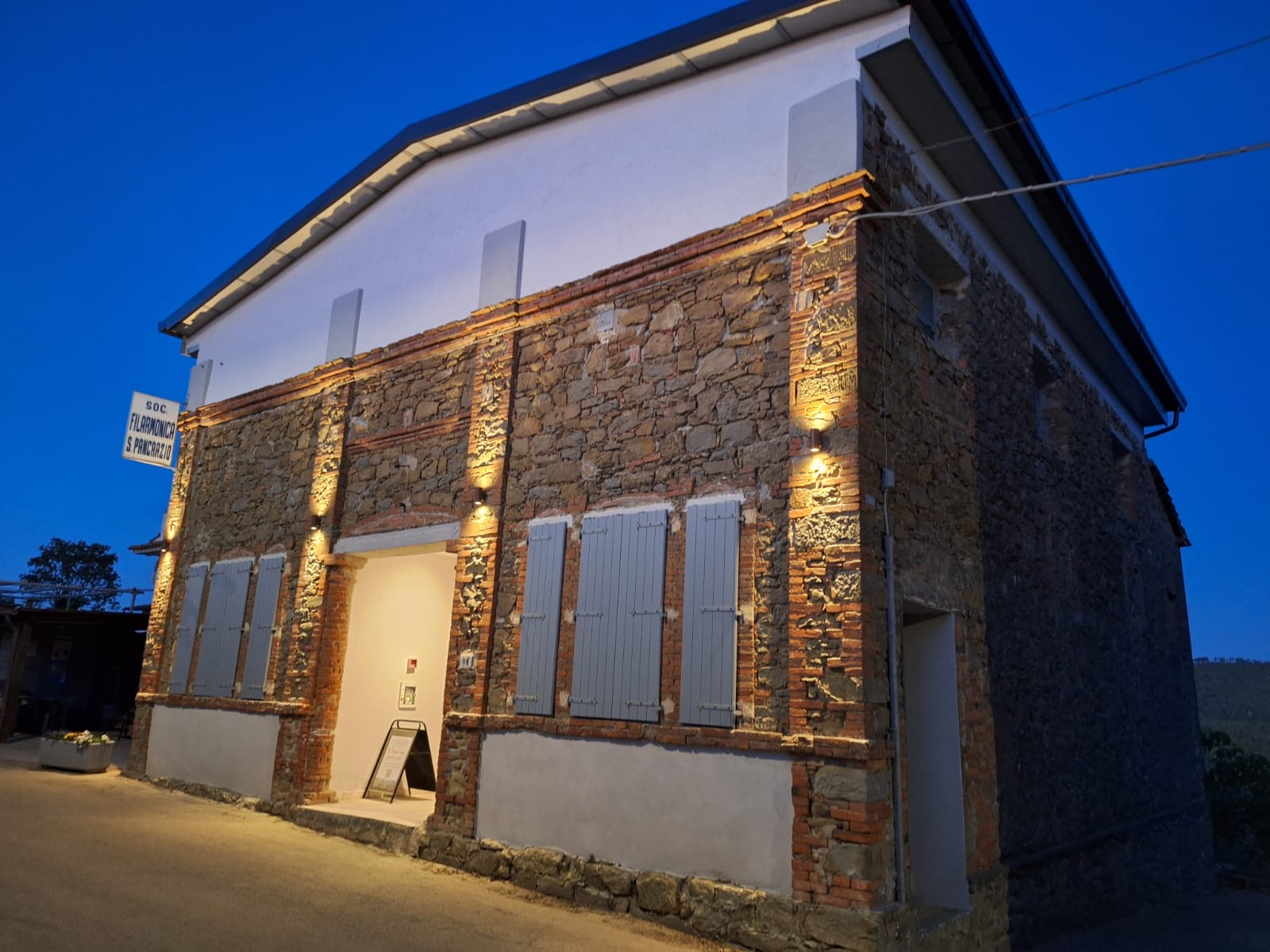
La filarmonica di San Pancrazio, a theatre from the 1920's that has been brought back to life as a concert hall

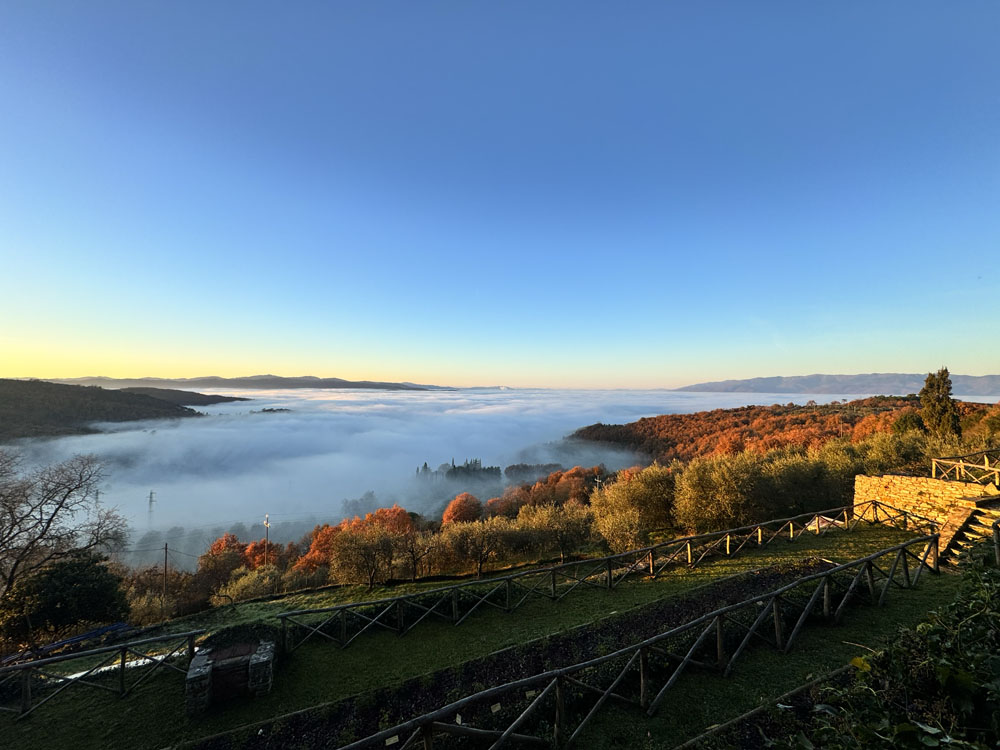
The view from the memorial rose garden in San Pancrazio north over the Valdarno valley

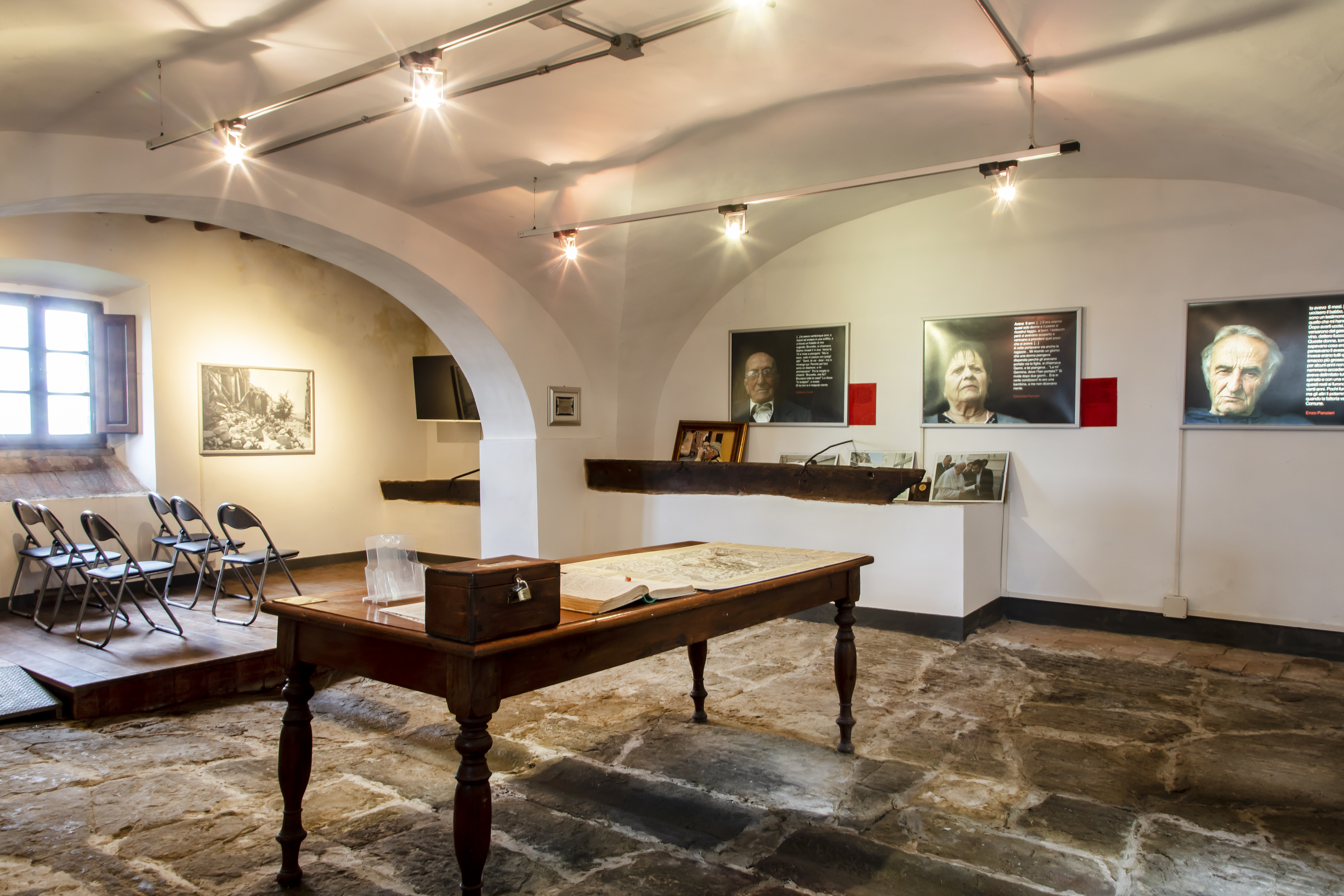
The museum dedicated to the victims of the 1944 massacre is hosted in the cellars of the Podestà

San Pancrazio is situated around 511 metres above sea level, in a pass between the Valdambra and Valdichiana valleys, where an ancient route passed between these two valleys, first under the Roman Empire and then under the Arezzo counts

San Pancrazio, like many other castles and villages in this area, also came under the control of the Florentine Republic in 1350. Today almost nothing remains of the medieval fortifications.

In San Pancrazio, Count Pierangeli, appointed Podestà, moved the podestà's seat to his palace. This building, dating back to the 17th century, was partially destroyed on June 29, 1944, by the Germans, who massacred 55 people in one of its cellars, almost all the men of the village. Today, in this space, thanks to the commitment of the municipal administration, the Museum of Memory and the Digital Archive of Memory have been created, so that the events narrated for years by the survivors can be historically documented, thus undertaking a concrete commitment to safeguarding historical memory.

One of the oldest buildings in the village is the Chiesa di San Rocco, a medieval small church built around 1242, today used to host art exhibitions.

Palazzo Tiglio is an imposing structure dating from 1690, home to many noble families such as the Scodellini, it has now been restored, and is now operating as a luxury hotel and gourmet restaurant, part of the Small Luxury Hotels of the World affiliation program.

La Filarmonica di San Pancrazio is a theatre and concert hall built in 1920 by the local musical association, built in the Italian rationalist style. It has been recently restored and now operates as a concert venue for chamber music.
