= Award for Civil Valor =

Award issued by Italy to recognize recipients as worthy of public honor

The awards for Civil Valor are the honors the Italian Republic grants in order to "reward acts of exceptional courage that clearly manifest civic virtue and to recognize the recipients as worthy of public honor". Individual citizens can receive the award (including posthumously), and it can also be bestowed collectively on all members of a military department or all residents of a municipality, city, or province when they have knowingly exposed their life to manifest danger.

== Historical background ==
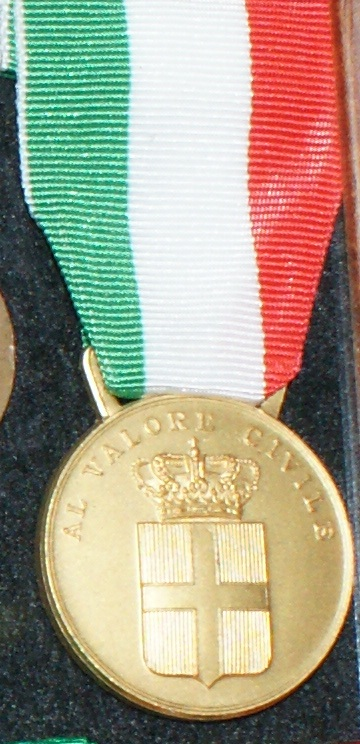
Gold medal for civil valor (Kingdom of Italy)

On 30 April 1851, Victor Emmanuel II, King of Sardinia, established the Medal for Civil Valor for the first time. When the Kingdom of Italy was established in 1861 with him as its first king, the Medal for Civil Valor became an award of the new kingdom.

The Carnegie Foundation, based in the Palazzo del Viminale, home of the Ministry of the Interior, has been involved in awards for civil valor since the Scottish philanthropist Andrew Carnegie in a 17 June 1911 letter to the President of the Council of Ministers, Prime Minister of Italy Giovanni Giolitti, granted to the government of the Kingdom of Italy a fund of US$750,000 in shares of the Carnegie Steel Company, annual annuities of which had to be used to pay premiums to people who were in economic difficulty but who nonetheless had worked in the face of danger to save the lives of others. Carnegie also suggested that instead of money, medals could be awarded to people who were not in economic difficulty.

In the modern Italian Republic, the law of 2 January 1958, Number 13, governs the awarding of medals for civil valor.

== Award criteria ==
The awards for civil valor can be made for specific acts, which include:

- Saving people exposed to imminent and grave danger;
- Preventing or diminishing the damage caused by a serious public or private disaster;
- Re-establishing public order where it has been gravely disturbed and maintaining the rule of law;
- Arresting or participating in the arrest of malefactors;
- Performing acts aimed at the progress of science or in general for the good of humanity;
- Keeping the name and prestige of the country high.

== Types of awards ==
Depending on the circumstances of time and place in which the action was performed and on the effects achieved, four different types of award can be presented:

- Gold Medal for Civil Valor
- Silver Medal for Civil Valor
- Bronze Medal for Civil Valor
- Certificate of Public Merit for Civil Valor (award has no ribbon)

The certificate is awarded by the Minister of the Interior, while the three medals are awarded by the President of the Italian Republic on the recommendation of the Minister of the Interior.

== Award procedure ==
The law provides (Article 7) that the granting of recognition normally will follow an examination of the courageous act by a committee composed of a prefect, a senator, a deputy, two members representing the Presidency of the Council of Ministers, a general of the Carabinieri, a representative of the Carnegie Foundation, and a member of the civil administration of the Ministry of the Interior. However, if "the character of the courageous act and the resonance that it has aroused in public opinion" are sufficient to attest to the propriety of the honor, the President of the Italian Republic can proceed with the recognition without the evaluation of the commission (Article 8).

== Notable recipients ==
=== Individuals ===
==== Silver Medal for Civil Valor ====
- Felice Napoleone Canevaro (1838–1926), for humanitarian aid and contributions to public health while in command of the battleship Italia during a cholera epidemic in La Spezia in 1884.

=== Municipalities ===
Of particular significance are medals for civil valor the Italian Republic has awarded to cities, municipalities, and provinces in recognition of the acts of heroism credited to the entire community during war, natural disasters. or other tragedies at various times in Italy's national history.

==== Gold Medal for Civil Valor ====
===== Municipalities decorated for acts of self-denial during Italy's participation the Second World War (1940–1945) =====
- Acerra (awarded for collective heroism following a Nazi German massacre on 2 October 1943; 67 men and boys and 15 women and girls were killed, including 14 children, 48 elderly people, and 20 other adults)
- Ancona (awarded in 1960)
- Argenta (awarded in 1973)
- Avellino
- Benevento (awarded in 1961)
- Boves (awarded in 1963)
- Bucine (awarded in 1963)
- Castelforte (awarded in 2002)
- Civitella in Val di Chiana
- Foggia (awarded in 2007)
- Francavilla al Mare (awarded in 1959)
- Isernia (awarded in 1960)
- Marsala
- Matera (awarded in 2016)
- Messina (awarded in 1959)
- Ortona (awarded in 1959)
- Paternò (awarded in 1972)
- Rimini (awarded in 1961 in recognition of the 1944 Battle of Rimini)
- Santi Cosma e Damiano (awarded in 2002)
- Trapani (awarded in 1961)

===== Municipalities decorated for natural disasters =====
- Florence (awarded in 1968 following a 1966 flood)
- Legnago (awarded in 1883 following an 1882 flood)
- Verona (awarded in 1883 following an 1882 flood)

===== Municipalities decorated for other events =====
- Bologna (awarded in 1981 following the 1980 station massacre)

==== Silver Medal for Civil Valor ====
- Casteldelci (awarded in 2003 in recognition of the 1944 Fragheto massacre)
- Ceccano
- Cisterna di Latina
- Foligno
- Leonessa
- Stia
- Terni
- Tolentino
- Velletri
- Viterbo

==== Bronze Medal for Civil Valor ====
- Capracotta
- Civitella del Tronto
- Fidenza
- Monte Argentario
- Poggibonsi
- Pignataro Interamna
