= Civitella in Val di Chiana =

- Comune
- Comune di Civitella in Val di Chiana
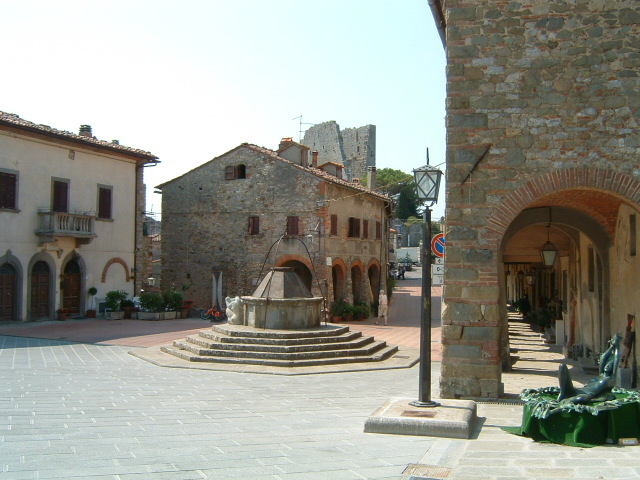
- View of Civitella in Val di Chiana

- Coat of arms

- Location within Italy Location within Tuscany
- Coordinates: 43°25′N 11°43′E
- Country: Italy
- Region: Tuscany
- Province: Arezzo (AR)
- Frazioni: Albergo, Badia al Pino (communal seat), Ciggiano, Oliveto, Pieve a Maiano, Pieve al Toppo, San Pancrazio, Spoiano, Tegoleto, Tuori, Viciomaggio.

Government
  - Mayor: Ginetta Menchetti

Area
  - Total: 100.37 km^{2} (38.75 sq mi)
- Elevation: 280 m (920 ft)

Population (31 December 2013)
  - Total: 9,091
  - Density: 90.57/km^{2} (234.6/sq mi)
- Demonym: Civitellini
- Time zone: UTC+1 (CET)
  - Summer (DST): UTC+2 (CEST)
- Postal code: 52040
- Dialing code: 0575
- Saint day: August 24
- Website: Official website

Civitella in Val di Chiana (official name), often also Civitella di Val di Chiana, is a comune in the province of Arezzo, south of Arezzo in Tuscany, Italy. It is one of the best-preserved of the network of Lombard fortresses of the 6th and the 7th century in central Italy, strategically placed to control the whole territory. The characteristic elliptical shape of the military settlements can still be seen in the layout of the town walls.

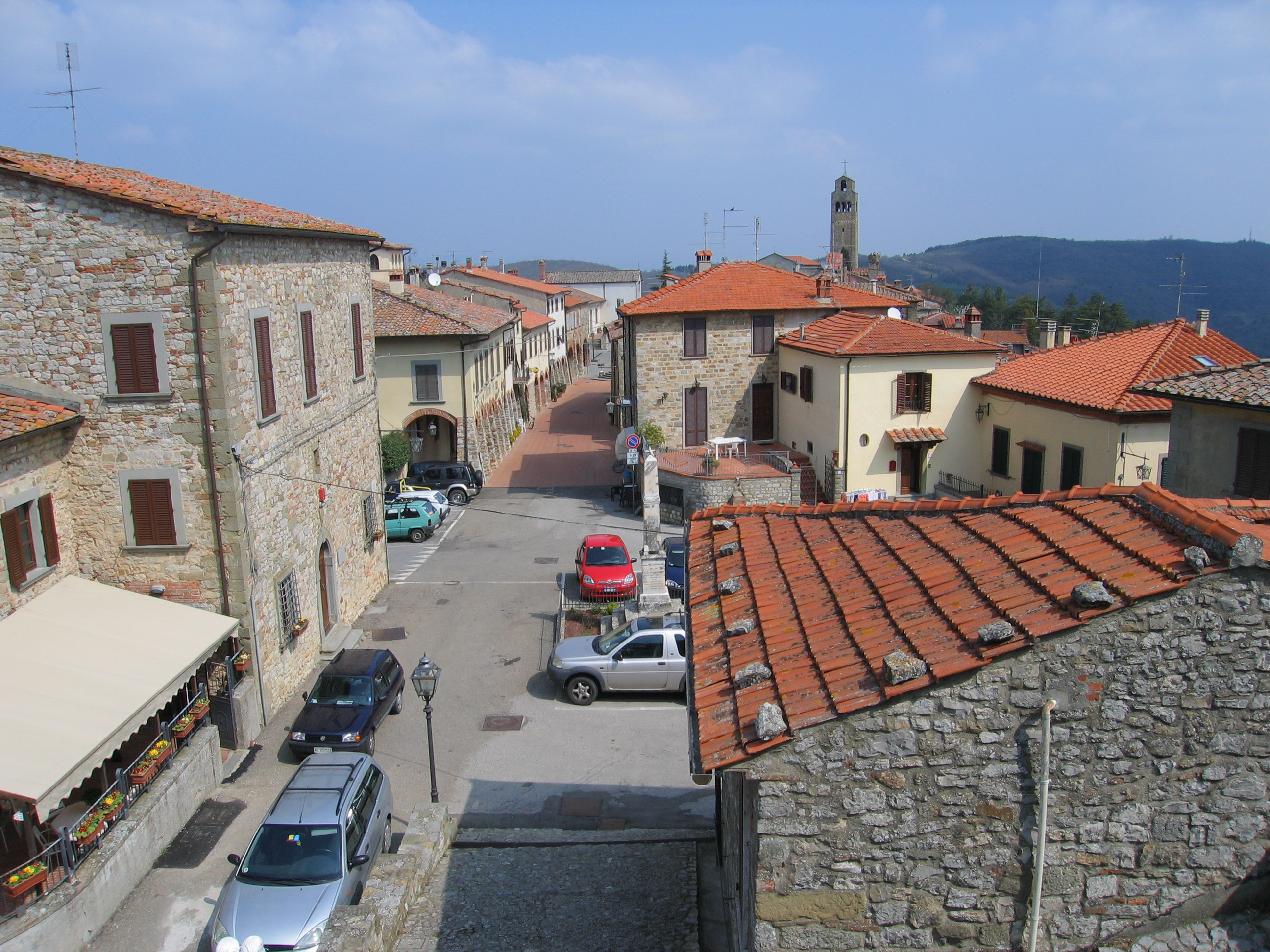
The village of Civitella di Val di Chiana from the castle

== History ==
Already inhabited in Roman times, it was occupied and fortified by the Lombards in the 6th century. In the 11th century it became a possession of the Bishops of Arezzo, and renamed "Civitella del Vescovo" ("Little Bishop's City"). In the 13th century the city was destroyed after the battle of Pieve al Toppo, cited by Dante Alighieri and fought nearby between Arezzo and Siena. After the Aretine defeat at Campaldino (1289) the city was annexed by Florence. In 1311 Arezzo regained it, holding until 1348, whenceforth it remained the seat of a Florentine podestà. Civitella enjoys one of the most scenic views of the Arezzo valley.

On 29 June 1944, 244 citizens of Civitella were massacred by soldiers of the Hermann Göring Division, in retaliation for the killing of two German soldiers at the hands of partisans. In 1963, the city received the Gold Medal for Civilian Valour. A book by Enzo Gradassi about Helga Elmqvist (the Swede) and Giovanni Cau, recounts the historic events that led to the massacre.

The city council has also opened a room of memories.

On 10 October 2006, SS Max Josef Milde was convicted by the Italian military court of La Spezia for his role in the Civitella massacre and similar events in San Pancrazio. The Italian Court of Cassation in October 2008 ruled that Germany was to pay one million dollars to 203 victims of the massacre. However, the International Court of Justice later ruled that Italy was required to void the judgment out of respect for Germany's state immunity.

The town's cemetery is the resting place of the Scottish writer Muriel Spark.

== Main sights ==
- The Castle, erected in 1048 and surrounded by a massive line of walls. It was used as headquarters by the German army during World War II, and was destroyed by an Allied bombing in 1944. It has never been rebuilt.
- Palazzo Pretorio (14th century)
- The church of Santa Maria Assunta (11th century), finished in Romanesque style in 1252. It was restored in 1765 and enlarged in 1875. In 1934 two small side naves were added which were rebuilt after the destruction caused by the air raid in 1944.

== International relations ==
=== Sister cities ===
Civitella in Val di Chiana is twinned with:

- Kämpfelbach, Germany
- (Sahrawi Arab Democratic Republic) Ain Beda, Western Sahara
