= Alpini and mountain artillery formations in World War I =

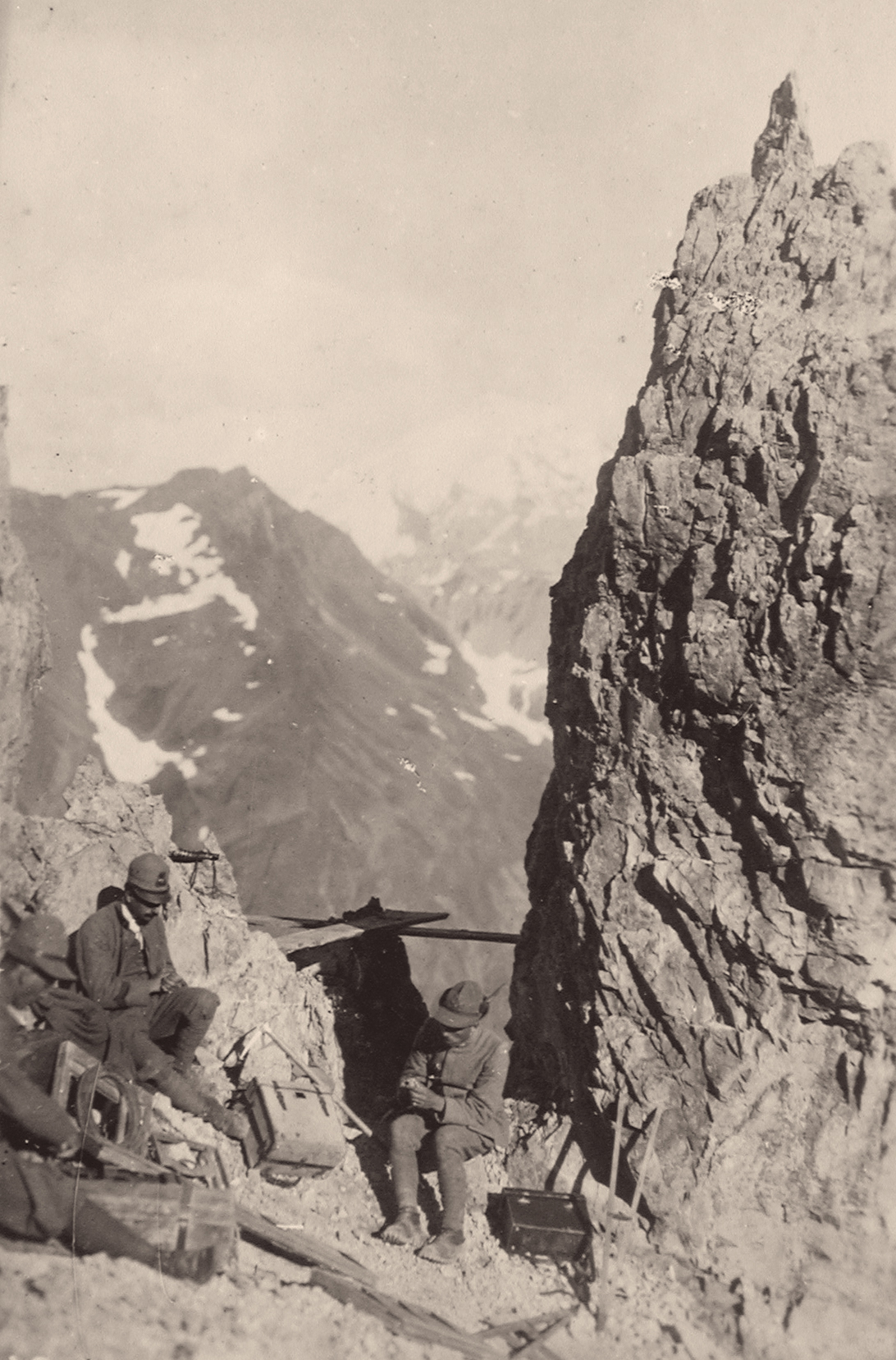
Alpini observation post on Monte Nero.

The Alpini (Italian for "alpines") are a specialised mountain warfare infantry corps of the Italian Army, which distinguished itself in World War I fighting in the Alps against Austro-Hungarian Kaiserjäger and the German Alpenkorps. The Alpini were supported by the Mountain Artillery, which both share the Cappello Alpino as identifying symbol. Below follow tables listing the regiments, battalions and groups, companies and batteries of the Alpini and Mountain Artillery active in World War I.

== Alpini ==
=== History ===
The Alpini were founded in 1872 and their mission was to protect Italy's northern mountain border with France and Austria-Hungary. Recruited locally in the valleys of the Alps they were the trained in mountain warfare and based in locations along the Alpine arch. The regiments were numbered 1 to 8 from West to East and the regular battalions named for the locations of their depots, which served as training centers and for materiel storage. These were organized in standard TO&E of:

- Regimental HQ
- Three mountain infantry battalions
- Support elements assigned to HQ
- Depot elements

After the raising of the "Belluno" battalion on 1 October 1910 the Alpini numbered 79 companies organized in 26 battalions. Each battalion, with the exception of the "Verona", consisted of three Alpini companies of one captain, four lieutenants and 250 other ranks. The "Verona" was the only battalion to field four companies.

After the outbreak of World War I in 1914 an additional 38 Alpini companies, numbered from 80 to 117, were raised from men, who had completed their military service in the preceding four years (i.e. completed it between 1910 and 1914). These companies were used to augment the regular battalions. Starting in early January 1915 each Alpini battalion activated a reserve battalion. Named after a valley (in Italian: "Val" or "Valle") located near the regular battalion's depot, these "Valle" battalions were filled with men, who had completed their military service at least four years, but not more than 11 years earlier (i.e. completed it between 1911 and 1904). The companies of the "Valle" battalions were numbered from 201 to 281, with the numbers 227, 233, 237, 271, and 273 never assigned to a company (227th originally meant for the "Val Pellice", but the battalion received the 224th Company instead; 233rd originally meant for the "Val Dora", but the battalion received the 3rd Company instead; 271st originally meant for the "Val Fella", but the battalion received the 8th Company instead).

After the Italian declaration of war against Austria-Hungary on 23 May 1915 the Alpini were heavily employed in the mountainous areas of the Italian front. At the end of 1915 the depots began to raise new battalions with drafted men born in 1896. These battalions were named after mountains (in Italian: "Monte") located near the regular battalion's depots and they received the 38 companies already raised in 1914. The new companies of these battalions were numbered from 118 to 157. One additional "Monte" company (158th for the "Fenestrelle" battalion), and the "Monte Mandrone" battalion (159th, 160th, 161st company) were raised later (see 5th Alpini Regiment for details about the "Monte Mandrone").

All in all the regiments of Alpini mountain infantry had during the First World War organized into between 9 and 14 battalions (3 regular and 6 to 12 reserve), operationally assigned to regiment-sized Groups (Gruppo), each Group attached to brigade-sized Groupings (Raggruppamento) with operational HQ and support elements.

==== Machine Gunner Companies ====
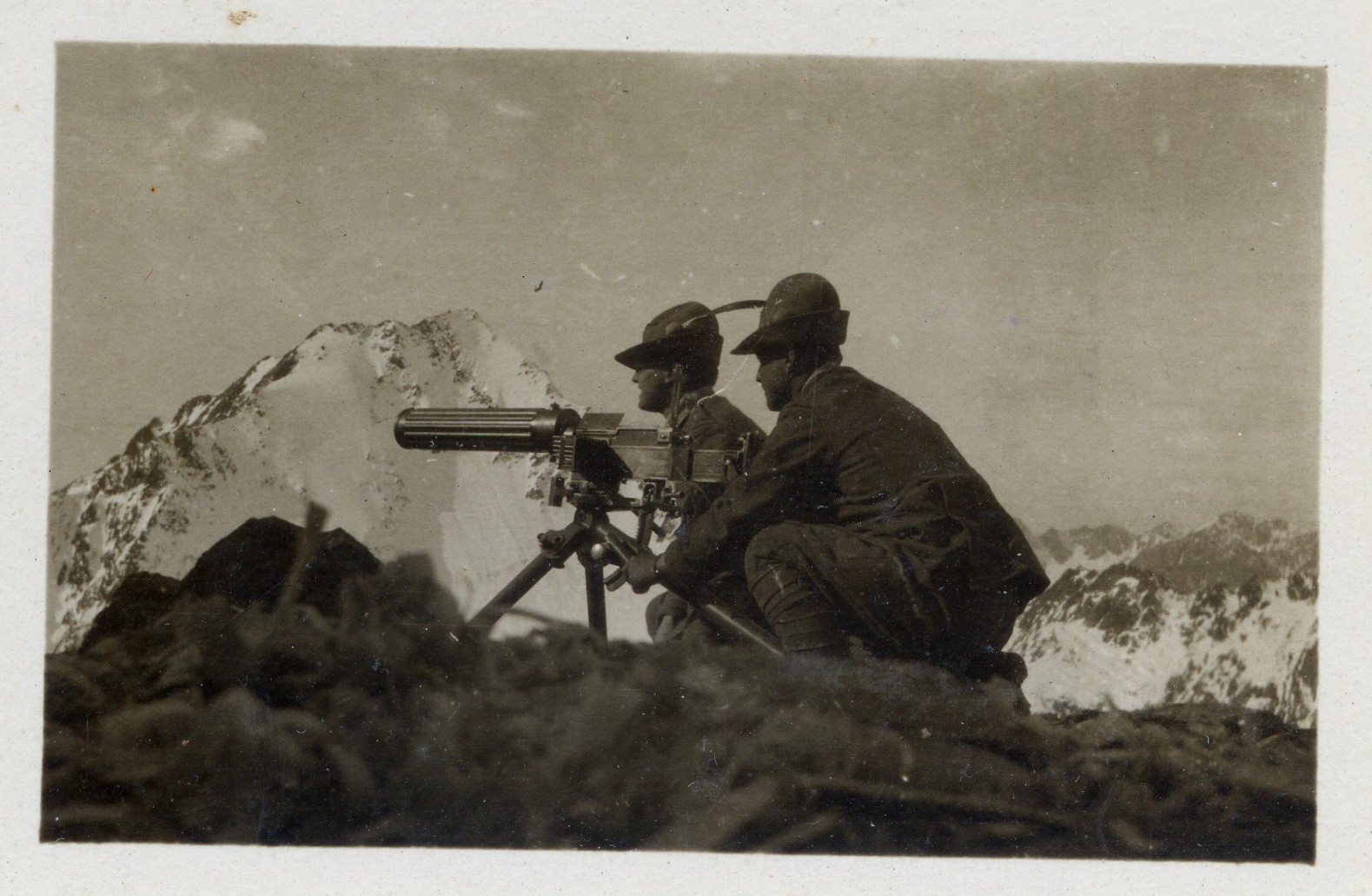
Alpini machine gunners operating a Fiat–Revelli Modello 1914.

At the outbreak of war each infantry and Bersaglieri battalion of the Italian Army fielded one machine gun section with two Maxim 1911 machine guns carried by horses. Alpini battalions fielded two machine gun sections with two Maxim 1911 machine guns carried by mules. After the outbreak of the war this proved quickly to be inadequate and in spring 1916 the army began to raise dedicated machine gunner companies ("Compagnia Mitraglieri"). These companies were attached to brigades, divisions and army corps, which deployed them with tactical units (regiments, battalions, companies) as needed. 2,277 Machine Gunner companies were raised and numbered continuously. The Alpini depots raised 50 companies equipped with six Hotchkiss M1909 Benét–Mercié machine gunmachine guns each, and 119 companies equipped with six Fiat–Revelli Modello 1914 machine guns each.

The St. Étienne Mle 1907 equipped machine gunner companies were the: 78th, 79th, 87th, 89th, 91st, 92nd, 116th, 117th, 121st, 133rd, 141st, 143rd, 166th, 167th, 176th, 190th, 191st, 192nd, 350th, 416th, 417th, 441st, 442nd, 456th, 467th, 491st, 492nd, 2021st, 2057th, 2101st, 2191st, 2207th, 2227th, 2230th, 2231st, 2232nd, 2233rd, 234th, 2235th, 2236th, 2237th, 2238th, 2260th, 2262nd, 2265th, 2266th, 2268th, 2284th, 2275th, and 2276th.

The Hotchkiss M1909 Benét–Mercié machine gun equipped machine gunner companies were the: 201st, 202nd, 215th, 218th, 219th, 257th, 296th, 316th, 337th,347th, 348th, 503rd, 504th, 505th, 506th, 507th, 508th, 509th, 526th, 527th, 557th, 558th, 559th, 560th, 617th, 625th, 636th, 637th, 638th, 639th, 652nd, 661st, 662nd, 663rd, 664th, 665th, 670th, 671st, 691st, 692nd, 693rd, 694th, 695th, 741st, 742nd, 745th, 799th, 817th, 819th, 820th, 821st, 880th, 890th, 891st, 932nd, 933rd, 934th, 935th, 936th, 938th, 979th, 980th, 981st, 982nd, 983rd, 1259th, 1260th, 1261st, 1284th, 1337th, 1351st, 1355th, 1356th, 1357th, 1358th, 1359th, 1374th, 1380th, 1388th, 1397th, 1411th, 1451st, 1452nd, 1457th, 1559th, 1560th, 1602nd, 1603rd, 1604th, 1620th, 1621st, 1622nd, 1634th, 1635th, 1636th, 1637th, 1638th, 1734th, 1740th, 1741st, 1742nd, 1743rd, 1744th, 1747th, 1771st, 1772nd, 1773rd, 1774th, 1775th, 1776th, 1777th, 1778th, 1779th, 1801st, 1802nd, 1830th, 1831st, 1832nd, 1833rd, and 1834th.

==== Skiers Battalions ====
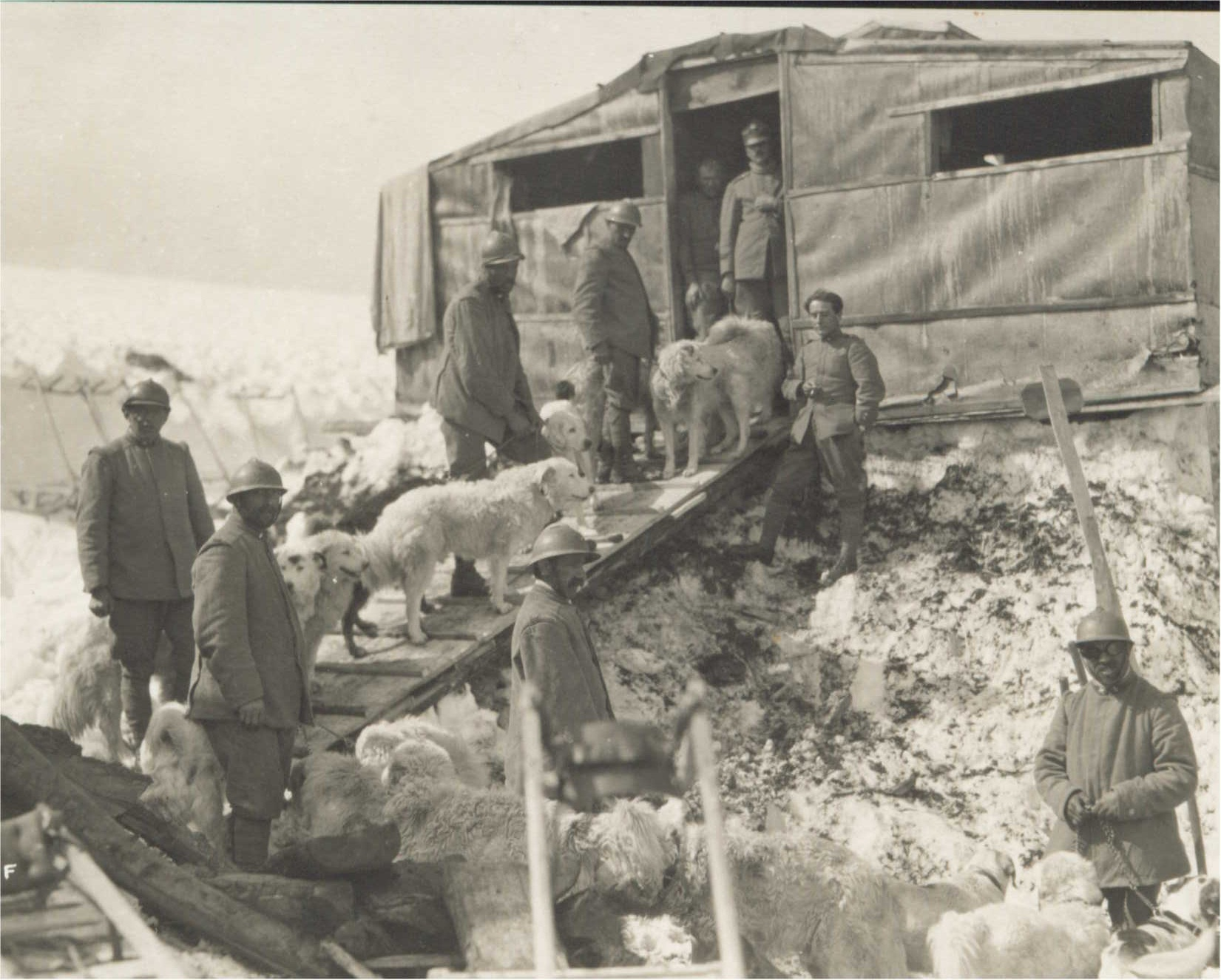
Ski troops with their sled dogs on Adamello glacier.

During the war each Alpini battalion raised a skiers platoon from its ranks. Starting on 9 January 1917 the army began to combine these platoons in twelve skiers battalions ("Battaglione Sciatori") of two companies and one train unit each. Each company had 18 dog sleds: six configured to carry wounded and twelve to carry the company's six Villar Perosa submachine guns with their ammunition. Each company also fielded a machine gun section with two Fiat–Revelli Modello 1914 machine guns. Until the end of March 1917 twelve battalions and two autonomous companies had been formed and numbered from West to East. However already on 15 May of the same year ten of the battalions were disbanded or their men used to form seven regular Alpini battalions. Only the I and II Skiers battalion continued to serve on the glaciers of the Adamello-Presanella Alps and Ortler Alps. Ultimately both battalions were reformed as Alpini battalions in spring 1918. Until the end of the war a total of nine battalions were raised with men and companies of the former skiers battalions and their companies were numbered:

- from 282 to 286 for newly raised companies
- from 290 to 311 for former skiers companies

The numbers 287, 288, 289 were not assigned. As an example: on 15 May 1917 the two newly raised 282nd and 283rd companies were combined with the 302nd company, which contained the remaining men of the V Skiers Battalion to form the "Pallanza" Alpini Battalion. The battalions were assigned to higher commands as follows:

| Army | Battalion | Company | Fate |
|---|---|---|---|
| 1st Army | I Skiers Battalion | 1st Skiers Company | Became the Alpini Battalion "Monte Ortler" on 24 February 1918 |
| 1st Army | I Skiers Battalion | 9th Skiers Company | Became the Alpini Battalion "Monte Ortler" on 24 February 1918 |
| 1st Army | II Skiers Battalion | 2nd Skiers Company | Became the Alpini Battalion "Monte Cavento" on 4 March 1918 |
| 1st Army | II Skiers Battalion | 10th Skiers Company | Became the Alpini Battalion "Monte Cavento" on 4 March 1918 |
| 1st Army | III Skiers Battalion | 11th Skiers Company | Alpini Battalion "Monte Pasubio" |
| 1st Army | III Skiers Battalion | 25th Skiers Company | Alpini Battalion "Monte Pasubio" |
| 1st Army | IV Skiers Battalion | 12th Skiers Company | Alpini Battalion "Monte Pasubio" |
| 1st Army | IV Skiers Battalion | 13th Skiers Company | Alpini Battalion "Monte Pasubio" |
| 1st Army | | 24th Autonomous Skiers Company | Alpini Battalion "Monte Tonale" |
| 6th Army | V Skiers Battalion | 3rd Skiers Company | Alpini Battalion "Pallanza" |
| 6th Army | V Skiers Battalion | 4th Skiers Company | Alpini Battalion "Pallanza" |
| 6th Army | VI Skiers Battalion | 14th Skiers Company | Alpini Battalion "Cuneo" |
| 6th Army | VI Skiers Battalion | 15th Skiers Company | Alpini Battalion "Cuneo" |
| 6th Army | VII Skiers Battalion | 5th Skiers Company | Alpini Battalion "Courmayeur" |
| 6th Army | VII Skiers Battalion | 6th Skiers Company | Alpini Battalion "Courmayeur" |
| 6th Army | VIII Skiers Battalion | 19th Skiers Company | Alpini Battalion "Monte Marmolada" |
| 6th Army | VIII Skiers Battalion | 20th Skiers Company | Alpini Battalion "Monte Marmolada" |
| 4th Army | IX Skiers Battalion | 8th Skiers Company | disbanded |
| 4th Army | IX Skiers Battalion | 23rd Skiers Company | disbanded |
| 4th Army | X Skiers Battalion | 7th Skiers Company | disbanded |
| 4th Army | X Skiers Battalion | 21st Skiers Company | disbanded |
| 4th Army | | 22nd Autonomous Skiers Company | disbanded |
| XII Army Corps | XI Skiers Battalion | 16th Skiers Company | Alpini Battalion "Monte Nero" |
| XII Army Corps | XI Skiers Battalion | 17th Skiers Company | Alpini Battalion "Monte Nero" |
| 2nd Army | XII Skiers Battalion | 18th Skiers Company | Alpini Battalion "Monte Nero" |
| 2nd Army | XII Skiers Battalion | 26th Skiers Company | Alpini Battalion "Monte Nero" |

==== Initial operational deployment ====
The regimental commands of the eight Alpini regiments were disbanded in the first years of the war. Their officers were used to create regiment-sized Groups ("Gruppo"), which numbered twenty by the war's end (1° to 20°) and brigade-sized Groupings ("Raggruppamento"), which numbered nine by war's end (I to IX). These had HQ and support elements under them and were responsible for the battalions. For larger operations divisional commands were assigned groupings and the necessary support units, however these divisions were not part of the Alpini corps. By war's end the 52nd and 80th divisional commands had at one point or the other commanded two Alpini groupings, while the 5th and 75th divisional commands, which were tasked with static defense in the Giudicarie and Bergamasque Alps fielded almost exclusively Alpini Groupings.

As an example for the operational deployment of the Alpini below follows the order of battle of the 52nd Division for the assault on Monte Ortigara on 10 June 1917.

52nd Division
| Command of 1st and 2nd Group^{Note 1} | Command of 8th and 9th Group^{Note 1} | Divisional Reserve |
|---|---|---|
| 1st Alpini Group; Alpini Battalion "Monte Spluga"; Alpini Battalion "Tirano"; Alpini Battalion "Monte Stelvio"; Alpini Battalion "Valtellina"; Alpini Battalion "Vestone"; 78th Machine Gunner Company; 79th Machine Gunner Company; 176th Machine Gunner Company; 456th Machine Gunner Company; 661st Machine Gunner Company; 2nd Alpini Group; Alpini Battalion "Ceva"; Alpini Battalion "Val Tanaro"; Alpini Battalion "Val Stura"; Alpini Battalion "Bicocca"; Alpini Battalion "Mondovì"; 527th Machine Gunner Company; 693rd Machine Gunner Company; 694th Machine Gunner Company; 695th Machine Gunner Company; XIII Mountain Artillery Group; 13th Artillery Battery; 44th Artillery Battery; 62nd Mountain Artillery Battery | 8th Alpini Group; Alpini Battalion "Monte Mercantur"; Alpini Battalion "Val Arroscia"; Alpini Battalion "Val Ellero"; Alpini Battalion "Monte Clapier"; 215th Machine Gunner Company; 662nd Machine Gunner Company; 691st Machine Gunner Company; 9th Alpini Group; Alpini Battalion "Verona"; Alpini Battalion "Monte Baldo"; Alpini Battalion "Bassano"; Alpini Battalion "Sette Comuni"; 202nd Machine Gunner Company; 663rd Machine Gunner Company; 692nd Machine Gunner Company; XXII Mountain Artillery Group; 45th Mountain Artillery Battery; 47th Mountain Artillery Battery; 48th Mountain Artillery Battery | Alpini Battalion "Cuneo"; Alpini Battalion "Monte Saccarello"; Alpini Battalion "Val Dora"; Alpini Battalion "Monte Marmolada"; 10th Mountain Artillery Grouping; XXIII Mountain Artillery Group; 45th Artillery Battery; 46th Mountain Artillery Battery; 50th Mountain Artillery Battery; XXIV Mountain Artillery Group; 56th Mountain Artillery Battery; 60th Mountain Artillery Battery |

The two commands were renamed I Alpini Grouping respectively IV Alpini Grouping on 20 July 1920

==== Military Awards ====
Medals of Military Valor awarded to a battalion for its conduct during the war are also listed in the table below. If more than one battalion distinguished itself in a battle they were collectively awarded a shared medal of military valor, but no matter the number of battalions awarded a shared medal, only one medal was pinned to the regiment's war flag.

=== 1st Alpini Regiment ===
The 1st Alpini Regiment was based in Mondovì and recruited in the Ligurian Alps and Maritime Alps. During the war the regiment's battalions fought:

- in 1915 in the battles of Monte Cukla, and Monte Rombon
- in 1916 in the battles of Monte Rosso, Altopiano di Asiago, and Cimone d'Arsiero
- in 1917 in the battles of Monte Ortigara, Caporetto, Monte Fior, Monte Grappa, and Col della Berretta
- in 1918 in the battle of Sella del Tonale

The regiment's battalions were awarded three Silver Medals of Military Valor during the war, one of which was shared between the "Ceva" and "Monte Saccarello" battalions.

1st Alpini Regiment, in Mondovì
| Ceva Depot | Pieve di Teco Depot | Mondovì Depot |
|---|---|---|
| Alpini Battalion "Ceva": 1st Alpini Company; 4th Alpini Company; 5th Alpini Company | Alpini Battalion "Pieve di Teco" (disbanded on 14 March 1916 because of heavy losses): 2nd Alpini Company; 3rd Alpini Company; 8th Alpini Company | Alpini Battalion "Mondovì": 2nd Alpini Company ^{Note 1}; 9th Alpini Company; 10th Alpini Company; 11th Alpini Company |
| Alpini Battalion "Val Tanaro": 201st Alpini Company; 204th Alpini Company; 205th Alpini Company | Alpini Battalion "Val Arroscia": 202nd Alpini Company; 203rd Alpini Company; 208th Alpini Company | Alpini Battalion "Val Ellero": 209th Alpini Company; 210th Alpini Company; 211th Alpini Company |
| Alpini Battalion "Monte Mercantur": 98th Alpini Company (ex "Ceva"); 116th Alpini Company (ex "Ceva"); 121st Alpini Company | Alpini Battalion "Monte Saccarello": 107th Alpini Company (ex "Pieve di Teco"); 115th Alpini Company (ex "Pieve di Teco"); 120th Alpini Company | Alpini Battalion "Monte Clapier": 114th Alpini Company (ex "Mondovì"); 118th Alpini Company; 119th Alpini Company |

Note 1: The 2nd Alpini Company, originally part of the disbanded "Pieve di Teco" battalion, was re-raised by the Mondovì depot and joined the "Mondovì" on 5 December 1916.

=== 2nd Alpini Regiment ===
The 2nd Alpini Regiment was based in Cuneo and recruited in the Maritime Alps and Cottian Alps. During the war the regiment's battalions fought:

- in 1915 in the battles of Pal Piccolo, Pal Grande, and Freikofel
- in 1916 in the battles of Monte Fior, Castelgomberto, Monte Cukla, Monte Rombon, and Monte Pasubio
- in 1917 in the battles of Monte Nero, Monte Rosso, Monte Rombon, Monte Vodice, Monte Ortigara, Monte Grappa, and Val Calcino
- in 1918 in the battles of Sella del Tonale, Val Camonica, and Giudicarie

The regiment's battalions were awarded three Silver Medals of Military Valor during the war, one of which was shared between the "Val Maira", "Val Varaita", "Monte Argentera", and "Monviso" battalions.

2nd Alpini Regiment, in Cuneo
| Borgo San Dalmazzo Depot | Dronero Depot | Saluzzo Depot |
|---|---|---|
| Alpini Battalion "Borgo San Dalmazzo": 13th Alpini Company; 14th Alpini Company; 15th Alpini Company | Alpini Battalion "Dronero": 17th Alpini Company; 18th Alpini Company; 19th Alpini Company | Alpini Battalion "Saluzzo": 21st Alpini Company; 22nd Alpini Company; 23rd Alpini Company |
| Alpini Battalion "Val Stura": 213th Alpini Company; 214th Alpini Company; 215th Alpini Company | Alpini Battalion "Val Maira": 217th Alpini Company; 218th Alpini Company; 219th Alpini Company | Alpini Battalion "Val Varaita": 221st Alpini Company; 222nd Alpini Company; 223rd Alpini Company |
| Alpini Battalion "Monte Argentera": 99th Alpini Company (ex "Borgo San Dalmazzo"); 117th Alpini Company (ex "Borgo San Dalmazzo"); 122nd Alpini Company | Alpini Battalion "Bicocca": 81st Alpini Company (ex "Dronero"); 101st Alpini Company (ex "Dronero"); 123rd Alpini Company | Alpini Battalion "Monviso": 80th Alpini Company (ex "Saluzzo"); 100th Alpini Company (ex "Saluzzo"); 124th Alpini Company |
| Alpini Battalion "Cuneo" (formed with men of the VI Skiers Battalion): 297th Alpini Company; 298th Alpini Company; 299th Alpini Company | | |

=== 3rd Alpini Regiment ===
The 3rd Alpini Regiment was based in Turin and recruited in the Cottian Alps and Graian Alps. During the war the regiment's battalions fought:

- in 1915 in the battles of Monte Vrata, Monte Nero, Tofane, and Tolmino
- in 1916 in the battle of Alto But
- in 1917 in the battles of Monte Vodice, Bainsizza, Monte Nero, Val Resia, and Monte Grappa
- in 1918 in the battles of Monte Altissimo, and Monte Grappa

The regiment's battalions were awarded three Silver Medals of Military Valor during the war, one of which was shared between the "Susa" and "Exilles" battalions for the conquest of Monte Nero.

3rd Alpini Regiment, in Turin
| Pinerolo Depot | Fenestrelle Depot | Exilles Depot | Susa Depot |
|---|---|---|---|
| Alpini Battalion "Pinerolo": 25th Alpini Company; 26th Alpini Company; 27th Alpini Company | Alpini Battalion "Fenestrelle": 28th Alpini Company; 29th Alpini Company; 30th Alpini Company; 158th Alpini Company | Alpini Battalion "Exilles": 31st Alpini Company; 32nd Alpini Company; 33rd Alpini Company | Alpini Battalion "Susa": 34th Alpini Company; 35th Alpini Company; 36th Alpini Company |
| Alpini Battalion "Val Pellice": 224th Alpini Company; 225th Alpini Company; 226th Alpini Company | Alpini Battalion "Val Chisone": 228th Alpini Company; 229th Alpini Company; 230th Alpini Company | Alpini Battalion "Val Dora": 3rd Alpini Company ^{Note 1}; 231st Alpini Company; 232nd Alpini Company | Alpini Battalion "Val Cenischia": 234th Alpini Company; 235th Alpini Company; 236th Alpini Company |
| Alpini Battalion "Monte Granero": 82nd Alpini Company (ex "Pinerolo"); 125th Alpini Company; 126th Alpini Company | Alpini Battalion "Monte Albergian": 83rd Alpini Company (ex "Fenestrelle"); 127th Alpini Company; 128th Alpini Company | Alpini Battalion "Monte Assietta": 84th Alpini Company (ex "Exilles"); 129th Alpini Company; 130th Alpini Company | Alpini Battalion "Moncenisio": 85th Alpini Company (ex "Susa"); 102nd Alpini Company (ex "Susa"); 131st Alpini Company |
| Alpini Battalion "Courmayeur" (formed with men of the VII Skiers Battalion): 303rd Alpini Company; 304th Alpini Company; 305th Alpini Company | | | |

Note 1: The 3rd Alpini Company, originally part of the disbanded "Pieve di Teco" battalion, was re-raised by the Exilles depot and joined the "Val Dora" on 24 December 1916.

=== 4th Alpini Regiment ===
The 4th Alpini Regiment was based in Ivrea and recruited in the Graian Alps and Pennine Alps. During the war the regiment's battalions fought:

- in 1915 in the battles of Monte Rosso, Dolje, and Monte Mrzli (Fourth Battle of the Isonzo)
- in 1916 in the battles of Monte Adamello, Monte Cima, Monte Zugna, Monte Cauriol, Monte Cardinal, Alpe di Cosmagnon, and Dente del Pasubio
- in 1917 in the battles of Monte Vodice, Meletta di Gallio, Monte Fior, and Monte Grappa
- in 1918 in the battle of Monte Solarolo

The regiment's battalions were awarded one Gold Medal of Military Valor and five Silver Medals of Military Valor during the war, four of which were shared between the "Intra" and "Val D'Orco", "Aosta" and "Val Toce", "Monte Levanna" and "Aosta", "Monte Levanna" and "Val Toce" battalions.

4th Alpini Regiment, in Ivrea
| Ivrea Depot | Aosta Depot | Intra Depot |
|---|---|---|
| Alpini Battalion "Ivrea": 38th Alpini Company; 39th Alpini Company; 40th Alpini Company | Alpini Battalion "Aosta": 41st Alpini Company; 42nd Alpini Company; 43rd Alpini Company | Alpini Battalion "Intra": 7th Alpini Company; 24th Alpini Company; 37th Alpini Company |
| Alpini Battalion "Val d'Orco": 238th Alpini Company; 239th Alpini Company; 240th Alpini Company | Alpini Battalion "Val Baltea": 241st Alpini Company; 242nd Alpini Company; 280th Alpini Company | Alpini Battalion "Val Toce": 207th Alpini Company; 243rd Alpini Company; 281st Alpini Company |
| Alpini Battalion "Monte Levanna": 86th Alpini Company (ex "Ivrea"); 111th Alpini Company (ex "Ivrea"); 132nd Alpini Company | Alpini Battalion "Monte Cervino": 87th Alpini Company (ex "Aosta"); 103rd Alpini Company (ex "Aosta"); 133rd Alpini Company | Alpini Battalion "Monte Rosa": 112th Alpini Company (ex "Intra"); 134th Alpini Company; 135th Alpini Company |
| Alpini Battalion "Pallanza" (formed with men of the V Skiers Battalion): 282nd Alpini Company (newly raised); 283rd Alpini Company (newly raised); 302nd Alpini Company | | |

=== 5th Alpini Regiment ===
The 5th Alpini Regiment was based in Milan and recruited in the valleys of Northern Lombardy, which lie mostly within the Lepontine Alps, Bergamasque Alps and Livigno Alps. The recruiting area of the 5th Alpini extended to the Westerns shore of Lake Garda, with the recruiting area of the 6th Alpini Regiment commencing on the Eastern shore. During the war the regiment's battalions fought:

- in 1915 in the battles of Monte Pasubio, Castellaccio, upper Valtellina, Tonale and Lagoscuro
- in 1916 in the battles of Monte Adamello, upper Valtellina, Monte Fior, Monte Vršič, Krasji Vrh, Castelgomberto, and Monte Pasubio
- in 1917 in the battles of Monte Forno, Monte Ortigara, Cima del Campanaro, and Bainsizza
- in 1918 in the battles of Cima Presena, Col d'Echele, Monte Melago, Monticelli, Punta San Matteo, Monte Mantello, Monte Cesen, and Vittorio Veneto

The regiment's "Val Chiese" battalion served from 1915 to August 1918 in the Val di Ledro and then in the battles of the Piave river. The "Edolo" battalion served for the entire war in the Adamello range and adjacent Tonale Pass area.

In spring 1915 the regiment's Morbegno Depot formed the 1st Alpini Volunteers Company, while in Milan volunteers formed the 2nd Alpini Volunteers Company. The two companies were merged in October 1915 as 1st Volunteer Unit ("Reparto Volontari") and fought in the Ortler area until March 1918 when the company was renamed 3rd Alpini Company and assigned to the "Mondovì" Battalion. The 3rd Company was originally part of the "Pieve di Teco" battalion, until battalion and company were disbanded after suffering heavy losses. The company was then reformed and assigned to the "Val Dora" battalion, until battalion company were disbanded after suffering heavy losses in the Battle of Caporetto. Also in spring 1915 the Edolo Depot formed the 3rd Alpini Volunteers Company "Val Camonica", which served in the Tonale-Adamello area until June 1918 when it was assigned as 311th Alpini Company to the Alpini Battalion "Monte Cavento". In Brescia a large number of volunteers formed another Volunteer Unit, which after training at the Vestone Depot was known as the Volunteer Unit "Vestone". The unit was attached to the "Vestone" battalion and served in the Lake Garda area until August 1916 when it was merged into the 1st Volunteer Unit.

In August 1915 the 5th Alpini Regiment organized the Autonomous Company "Garibaldi", which was tasked to garrison the area around the mountain hut of the same name in the Adamello range. On 20 April 1916 the company was elevated to Autonomous Battalion "Garibaldi" and staffed with Alpini soldiers of the 5th Alpini Regiment. On 6 September 1916 the battalion lost its autonomy and was integrated into the 5th Alpini as Alpini Battalion "Monte Mandrone".

The regiment's "Morbegno" battalion was awarded a Silver Medals of Military Valor during the war.

5th Alpini Regiment, in Milan
| Morbegno Depot | Tirano Depot | Edolo Depot | Vestone Depot |
|---|---|---|---|
| Alpini Battalion "Morbegno": 44th Alpini Company; 45th Alpini Company; 47th Alpini Company | Alpini Battalion "Tirano": 46th Alpini Company; 48th Alpini Company; 49th Alpini Company | Alpini Battalion "Edolo": 50th Alpini Company; 51st Alpini Company; 52nd Alpini Company | Alpini Battalion "Vestone": 53rd Alpini Company; 54th Alpini Company; 55th Alpini Company |
| Alpini Battalion "Val d'Intelvi": 244th Alpini Company; 245th Alpini Company; 247th Alpini Company | Alpini Battalion "Valtellina": 246th Alpini Company; 248th Alpini Company; 249th Alpini Company | Alpini Battalion "Val Camonica": 250th Alpini Company; 251st Alpini Company; 252nd Alpini Company | Alpini Battalion "Val Chiese": 253rd Alpini Company; 254th Alpini Company; 255th Alpini Company |
| Alpini Battalion "Monte Spluga": 88th Alpini Company (ex "Morbegno"); 104th Alpini Company (ex "Morbegno"); 136th Alpini Company | Alpini Battalion "Monte Stelvio": 89th Alpini Company (ex "Tirano"); 113th Alpini Company (ex "Tirano"); 137th Alpini Company | Alpini Battalion "Monte Adamello": 90th Alpini Company (ex "Edolo"); 105th Alpini Company (ex "Edolo"); 138th Alpini Company | Alpini Battalion "Monte Suello": 91st Alpini Company (ex "Vestone"); 139th Alpini Company; 140th Alpini Company |
| Alpini Battalion "Monte Mandrone": 159th Alpini Company (ex "Pinerolo"); 160th Alpini Company; 161st Alpini Company | Alpini Battalion "Monte Tonale": 285th Alpini Company (newly raised); 286th Alpini Company (newly raised); 293rd Alpini Company (former 24th Autonomous Skiers Company) | Alpini Battalion "Monte Ortler" (former I Skiers Battalion): 306th Alpini Company; 307th Alpini Company; 308th Alpini Company | Alpini Battalion "Monte Cavento" (former II Skiers Battalion): 309th Alpini Company; 310th Alpini Company; 311th Alpini Company^{Note 3} |

Note 3: Former 3rd Alpini Volunteers Company "Val Camonica"

=== 6th Alpini Regiment ===
The 6th Alpini Regiment was based in Verona and recruited primarily in the Vicentine Alps. During the war the regiment's battalions fought:

- in 1915 in the battles of Monte Pasubio, Coni Zugna, Monte Maggio, Altopiano di Tonezza, Altopiano di Asiago, Val Maso, Cima Vezzena, Busa Verde, and Zures
- in 1916 in the battles of Altopiano di Tonezza, Cimone d'Arsiero, Coston di Lora, Vallarsa, Sette Comuni, Monte Pasubio, Asiago, Monte Carbonile, Monte Cukla, Val Lagarina, Roncegno, Cima d'Asta, Alpe di Fassa, Monte Cauriol, and Forcella Magna
- in 1917 in the battles of Bainsizza, Meletta di Gallio, Tonderecar, Melette, Forcella Magna, Monte Cukla, Monte Badenecche, Ronzina, Val Tudrio, Codroipo, Tagliamento, Altopiano di Asiago, Monte Grappa, Col della Berretta, Monte Ortigara, and Col Caprile
- in 1918 in the battles of Monte Cornone, Col del Rosso, Col d'Echele, Croce di San Francesco, Monte Cesen, Vidor, Valdobbiadene, Monte Garda, Lentiai, Ponte di Busche and Vittorio Veneto

The regiment's battalions were awarded six Silver Medals of Military Valor during the war, one of which was shared between the "Verona", "Bassano", "Monte Baldo", and "Sette Comuni" battalions for their conduct during the battle of Monte Ortigara.

6th Alpini Regiment, in Verona
| Verona Depot | Vicenza Depot | Bassano Depot |
|---|---|---|
| Alpini Battalion "Verona": 56th Alpini Company; 57th Alpini Company; 58th Alpini Company; 73rd Alpini Company | Alpini Battalion "Vicenza": 59th Alpini Company; 60th Alpini Company; 61st Alpini Company | Alpini Battalion "Bassano": 62nd Alpini Company; 63rd Alpini Company; 74th Alpini Company |
| Alpini Battalion "Val d'Adige": 256th Alpini Company; 257th Alpini Company; 258th Alpini Company | Alpini Battalion "Val Leogra": 259th Alpini Company; 260th Alpini Company; 261st Alpini Company | Alpini Battalion "Val Brenta": 262nd Alpini Company; 263rd Alpini Company; 274th Alpini Company |
| Alpini Battalion "Monte Baldo": 92nd Alpini Company (ex "Verona"); 141st Alpini Company; 142nd Alpini Company | Alpini Battalion "Monte Berico": 93rd Alpini Company (ex "Vicenza"); 108th Alpini Company (ex "Vicenza"); 143rd Alpini Company | Alpini Battalion "Sette Comuni": 94th Alpini Company (ex "Bassano"); 144th Alpini Company; 145th Alpini Company |
| | Alpini Battalion "Monte Pasubio" (formed with men of the III and IV Skiers Battalions): 290th Alpini Company; 291st Alpini Company; 292nd Alpini Company | |

=== 7th Alpini Regiment ===
The 7th Alpini Regiment was based in Belluno and its recruiting area covered most of the Bellunes Alps. During the war the regiment's battalions fought:

- in 1915 in the battles of Forcella di Cima Bos, Val Cordevole, Forcella Lavaredo, Val Costeana, Monte Cavallin, Monte Piana, Tofane, Col di Lana, Punta del Forame, Forcella Magna, Cimon Rava, and Monte Setole
- in 1916 in the battles of Monte Cadini, Col dei Bos, Croda dell'Ancona, Masaré di Fontana Negra, Monte Cima, Monte Cauriol, Asiago, Lavaredo, Tofane, Cristallo, and Creste di Costabella
- in 1917 in the battles of Monte Cauriol, Bainsizza, Tonderecar, Monte Castelgomberto, Monte Tomatico, Val Calcino, Monte Valderoa, Monte Grappa, Monte Rosso, Monte Sol, Val Costeana, Monte Solarolo, Eleventh Isonzo, and Monte Altissimo
- in 1918 in the battles of Monte Altissimo, Monte Solarolo, Monte Grappa, and Vittorio Veneto

In spring 1915 the regiment's Feltre Depot formed the Alpini Volunteers Company "Feltre", while the Pieve di Cadore Depot formed the Alpini Volunteers Company "Cadore". In 1918 the two companies were merged into the Volunteer Unit "Feltre-Cadore" and assigned to the 4th Army.

The regiment's battalions were awarded two Silver Medals of Military Valor and two Bronze Medals of Military Valor during the war.

7th Alpini Regiment, in Belluno
| Feltre Depot | Pieve di Cadore Depot | Belluno Depot |
|---|---|---|
| Alpini Battalion "Feltre": 64th Alpini Company; 65th Alpini Company; 66th Alpini Company | Alpini Battalion "Pieve di Cadore": 67th Alpini Company; 68th Alpini Company; 75th Alpini Company | Alpini Battalion "Belluno": 77th Alpini Company; 78th Alpini Company; 79th Alpini Company |
| Alpini Battalion "Val Cismon": 264th Alpini Company; 265th Alpini Company; 277th Alpini Company | Alpini Battalion "Val Piave": 267th Alpini Company; 268th Alpini Company; 275th Alpini Company | Alpini Battalion "Val Cordevole": 206th Alpini Company; 266th Alpini Company; 276th Alpini Company |
| Alpini Battalion "Monte Pavione": 95th Alpini Company (ex "Feltre"); 148th Alpini Company; 149th Alpini Company | Alpini Battalion "Monte Antelao": 96th Alpini Company (ex "Pieve di Cadore"); 150th Alpini Company; 151st Alpini Company | Alpini Battalion "Monte Pelmo": 106th Alpini Company (ex "Belluno"); 146th Alpini Company; 147th Alpini Company |
| | | Alpini Battalion "Monte Marmolada" (formed with men of the VIII Skiers Battalion): 284th Alpini Company (newly raised); 300th Alpini Company; 301st Alpini Company |

=== 8th Alpini Regiment ===
The 8th Alpini Regiment was based in Venzone and recruited in the Carnic Alps and Carnic Prealps, and the Western side of the Julian Alps. During the war the regiment's battalions fought:

- in 1915 in the battles of Capella Sleme, Monte Jeza, Pal Piccolo, Pal Grande, Freikofel, Monte Croce, Val Dogna, Monte Jera, Monte Nero, Monte Vodil, Stauli Roner, Cresta Verde, Monte Kozliak, Monte Pleca, Monte Rosso, Dolje,
- in 1916 in the battles of Monte Vršič, Pal Piccolo, Monte Vrata, Cimone d'Arsiero, Malga Pozze, Monte Fasolo, Val d'Astico, Costone Cauriol, Asiago, Alpi di Fassa, Alto But, Passo del Cavallo, Cima Busa Alta,
- in 1917 in the battles of Busa Alta, Alto But, Costone Cauriol, Monte Tomatico, Fonzaso, Monte Prassolan, Costone del Pertica, Fontana Secca, Monte Solarolo, Col della Berretta, Col Caprile, Monte Valderoa, Monte Spinoncia
- in 1918 in the battles of Monte Solarolo, Monte Valderoa, Cima Cady, Monte Tonale, Monte Grappa, and Vittorio Veneto (Val Lagarina)

In spring 1915 the regiment's Gemona Depot also formed the Alpini Volunteers Company "Gemona-Cividale", which was disbanded in March 1917 after suffering heavy losses.

The regiment's battalions were awarded two Silver Medals of Military Valor, which were shared between the "Gemona", "Val Fella", and "Monte Canin", respectively between the "Tolmezzo" and "Val Tagliamento" battalions. The "Cividale" and "Val Natisone" battalions were both awarded a Bronze Medal of Military Valor.

8th Alpini Regiment, in Venzone
| Tolmezzo Depot | Gemona Depot | Cividale Depot^{Note 2} |
|---|---|---|
| Alpini Battalion "Tolmezzo": 6th Alpini Company; 12th Alpini Company; 72nd Alpini Company | Alpini Battalion "Gemona": 69th Alpini Company; 70th Alpini Company; 71st Alpini Company | Alpini Battalion "Cividale": 16th Alpini Company; 20th Alpini Company; 76th Alpini Company |
| Alpini Battalion "Val Tagliamento": 212th Alpini Company; 272nd Alpini Company; 278th Alpini Company | Alpini Battalion "Val Fella": 8th Alpini Company ^{Note 1}; 269th Alpini Company; 270th Alpini Company | Alpini Battalion "Val Natisone": 216th Alpini Company; 220th Alpini Company; 279th Alpini Company |
| Alpini Battalion "Monte Arvenis": 109th Alpini Company (ex "Tolmezzo"); 152nd Alpini Company; 153rd Alpini Company | Alpini Battalion "Monte Canin": 97th Alpini Company (ex "Gemona"); 154th Alpini Company; 155th Alpini Company | Alpini Battalion "Monte Matajur": 110th Alpini Company (ex "Cividale"); 156th Alpini Company; 157th Alpini Company |
| | | Alpini Battalion "Monte Nero" (formed with men of the XI and XII Skiers Battalions): 294th Alpini Company; 295th Alpini Company; 296th Alpini Company |

Note 1: The 8th Alpini Company, originally part of the disbanded "Pieve di Teco" battalion, was re-raised by the Gemona depot and joined the "Val Fella" on 15 May 1916.
Note 2: As the depot was too close to the front it was moved to Casarsa in 1915.

=== Battle of Caporetto ===
The Battle of Caporetto and following retreat was devastating for the Italian Army, which lost 305,000 men. The Alpini units along the Isonzo front and in the Carnic Alps and Dolomites were badly mauled and 20 Alpini battalions had to be disbanded at the end of the battle. A further seven were disbanded two months later to bring the remaining battalions back up to strength. Worst hit was the 8th Alpini Regiment, whose units were all deployed in the Julian and Carnic Alps and had to retrat the farthest. Seven of its ten battalions had to be disbanded, and as the regiment's depots were all overrun by German and Austro-Hungarian troops it could not replenish its ranks. The other regiments, which were badly hit were the 1st, 2nd, and 3rd Alpini, which lost between half and two-thirds of their battalions. The following battalions were disbanded:

| | 18 November 1917 | 22 November 1917 | 25 November 1917 | 30 November 1917 | 9 December 1917 | 15 February 1918 |
|---|---|---|---|---|---|---|
| 1st Alpini Regiment | "Monte Mercantur" "Val Arroscia" "Val Ellero" | | | "Ceva" | "Monte Saccarello" (re-raised 1 August 1918) | |
| 2nd Alpini Regiment | | | "Val Stura" "Bicocca" | "Monte Argentera" "Monviso" | | "Val Varaita" |
| 3rd Alpini Regiment | "Monte Assietta" | "Val Chisone" | "Monte Albergian" | | "Val Dora" | "Val Pellice" "Courmayeur" |
| 6th Alpini Regiment | | | "Val Leogra" | | | |
| 7th Alpini Regiment | | | | | "Belluno" "Monte Marmolada" | "Val Piave" |
| 8th Alpini Regiment | "Gemona" "Monte Canin" "Monte Nero" | | | | "Val Fella" | "Val Tagliamento" "Val Natisone" "Monte Matajur" |

=== Reorganization 1918 ===
After the disastrous Battle of Caporetto the Chief of Staff of the Italian Army Luigi Cadorna was finally dismissed and replaced by Armando Diaz. Diaz reorganized the army and ordered the Alpini groups to be formed into permanent formations of three Alpini battalions, each battalion with its own machine gunner company, one mountain artillery group, two autonomous machine gunner companies, and a "reparto cannoncini d'accompagnamento" (loosely translated: small accompaniment cannons unit), with Italian copies of the Austrian 3.7cm Infantry Gun M.15.

Likewise the Alpini groupings became permanent formations of two Alpini groups and one mountain artillery grouping, with two mountain artillery groups each. The Alpini groupings were combined in four divisions: the 5th and 75th static and tasked with the defense of front sectors in Western part of the theater, and the 52nd mobile and able to be deployed along the front as needed.

==== III Army Corps ====
The III Army Corps was one of two army corps of the 7th Army, which held the front from Stelvio Pass to the Western shore of Lake Garda. The III Army Corps held the northern part of the front from the Stelvio to Monte Listino, while the XIV Army Corps held the front from Monte Listino to Lake Garda. The XIV Army Corps consisted in 1918 of the 6th, 20th, 21st, and 22nd divisions.

===== 5th Alpine Division =====
Formed on 24 May 1915 at the outbreak of war the 5th Alpine Division was formed initially by the infantry brigades "Palermo" and "Cuneo", and the 27th Field Artillery Regiment. From its inception until the formation of the 75th Alpine Division the 5th Alpine Division garrisoned the front from the Swiss border through the Ortler Group to Tonale Pass and then through the Adamello Group to the Val Camonica. With the reorganization of the Alpini corps in 1918 the division ceded the III and V Alpini groups to the newly formed 75th Alpine Division and received the VII Alpini Group. For the rest of the war it focused on garrison the front from Gavia Pass to the Tonale pass and then through the Adamello Group and the Northern end of the Val Camonica.

After the Battle of Vittorio Veneto and the following Austro-Hungarian retreat the units of the division advance from Tonale Pass into the Val di Sole on 3 November 1918. They reach Malè and Cles, while a detachment occupies the Mendel Pass overlooking Bolzano, before the Armistice of Villa Giusti comes into effect at 3pm on 4 November.

| Division | Grouping | Group | Battalion | Regiment |
|---|---|---|---|---|
| 5th Alpine Division | IV Grouping | 7th Group | "Val Baltea" | 4th Alpini |
| 5th Alpine Division | IV Grouping | 7th Group | "Monte Mandrone" | 5th Alpini |
| 5th Alpine Division | IV Grouping | 7th Group | "Monte Cavento" | 5th Alpini |
| 5th Alpine Division | IV Grouping | 7th Group | XI Mtn. Artillery Grp. | 3rd Mtn. Artillery |
| 5th Alpine Division | IV Grouping | 19th Group | "Val d'Intelvi" | 5th Alpini |
| 5th Alpine Division | IV Grouping | 19th Group | "Monte Tonale" | 5th Alpini |
| 5th Alpine Division | IV Grouping | 19th Group | "Edolo" | 5th Alpini |
| 5th Alpine Division | IV Grouping | 19th Group | XLVII Mtn. Artillery Grp. | 3rd Mtn. Artillery |
| 5th Alpine Division | VI Grouping | 12th Group | "Monte Granero" | 3rd Alpini |
| 5th Alpine Division | VI Grouping | 12th Group | "Pallanza" | 4th Alpini |
| 5th Alpine Division | VI Grouping | 12th Group | "Val Cordevole" | 7th Alpini |
| 5th Alpine Division | VI Grouping | 12th Group | XLV Mtn. Artillery Grp. | 3rd Mtn. Artillery |
| 5th Alpine Division | VI Grouping | 14th Group | "Borgo San Dalmazzo" | 2nd Alpini |
| 5th Alpine Division | VI Grouping | 14th Group | "Fenestrelle" | 3rd Alpini |
| 5th Alpine Division | VI Grouping | 14th Group | "Moncenisio" | 3rd Alpini |
| 5th Alpine Division | VI Grouping | 14th Group | XXIX Mtn. Artillery Grp. | 1st Mtn. Artillery |
| 5th Alpine Division | VII Grouping | 8th Group | "Monte Clapier" | 1st Alpini |
| 5th Alpine Division | VII Grouping | 8th Group | "Pinerolo" | 3rd Alpini |
| 5th Alpine Division | VII Grouping | 8th Group | "Susa" | 3rd Alpini |
| 5th Alpine Division | VII Grouping | 8th Group | IV Mtn. Artillery Grp. | 1st Mtn. Artillery |
| 5th Alpine Division | VII Grouping | 16th Group | "Monte Rosa" | 4th Alpini |
| 5th Alpine Division | VII Grouping | 16th Group | "Val Brenta" | 6th Alpini |
| 5th Alpine Division | VII Grouping | 16th Group | "Tomezzo" | 8th Alpini |
| 5th Alpine Division | VII Grouping | 16th Group | XXXI Mtn. Artillery Grp. | 3rd Mtn. Artillery |

===== 75th Alpine Division =====
The 75th Alpine Division was formed on 1 June 1918 with the III and V Alpini Groupings, 42nd Territorial Militia Battalion and the 9th Mountain Artillery Grouping. From June to November the division patrolled the front in the upper Valtellina valley: from the Swiss border to Gavia Pass. For the last Italian offensive at Vittorio Veneto the division ceded on 15 October 1918 the command of the V Grouping and the 15th Group to the XXVII Army Corps. The grouping received the 18th Alpini Group and together the units crossed the Piave river near Vidor on 31 October 1918. While the 18th Group fought its way up the Piave valley towards Mel, the 15th covered the right flank and positioned itself around Valdobbiadene.

Meanwhile back in Valtellina on 3 November 1918 the III Grouping attacked Monte Scorluzzo and Monte Cristallo, the two mountains flanking the Stelvio Pass, and after three years of futile attempts finally managed to dislodge the few remaining Austrian defenders from the pass. By morning of 4 November the battalions of the III Grouping had descended from the pass and reached Prad am Stilfser Joch, Schluderns and the train station at Spondinig, thus cutting railway and road through the Vinschgau valley and with it the route of escape of Austria-Hungary's fleeing troops.

| Division | Grouping | Group | Battalion | Regiment |
|---|---|---|---|---|
| 75th Alpine Division | III Grouping | 3rd Group | "Cuneo" | 2nd Alpini |
| 75th Alpine Division | III Grouping | 3rd Group | "Val Cenischia" | 3rd Alpini |
| 75th Alpine Division | III Grouping | 3rd Group | "Monte Pasubio" | 6th Alpini |
| 75th Alpine Division | III Grouping | 3rd Group | VII Mtn. Artillery Grp. | 3rd Mtn. Artillery |
| 75th Alpine Division | III Grouping | 11th Group | "Val Tanaro" | 1st Alpini |
| 75th Alpine Division | III Grouping | 11th Group | "Val Maira" | 2nd Alpini |
| 75th Alpine Division | III Grouping | 11th Group | "Val Camonica" | 5th Alpini |
| 75th Alpine Division | III Grouping | 11th Group | XXIV Mtn. Artillery Grp. | 3rd Mtn. Artillery |
| 75th Alpine Division | V Grouping | 2nd Group | "Dronero" | 2nd Alpini |
| 75th Alpine Division | V Grouping | 2nd Group | "Saluzzo" | 2nd Alpini |
| 75th Alpine Division | V Grouping | 2nd Group | "Intra" | 4th Alpini |
| 75th Alpine Division | V Grouping | 2nd Group | XLI Mtn. Artillery Grp. | 18th Field Artillery |
| 75th Alpine Division | V Grouping | 15th Group | "Mondovì" | 1st Alpini |
| 75th Alpine Division | V Grouping | 15th Group | "Val d'Orco" | 4th Alpini |
| 75th Alpine Division | V Grouping | 15th Group | "Monte Ortler" | 5th Alpini |
| 75th Alpine Division | V Grouping | 15th Group | XLIII Mtn. Artillery Grp. | 1st Mtn. Artillery |

==== 52nd Alpine Division ====
The 52nd Alpine Division was formed on 10 January 1917 with the infantry brigades "Grosseto" and "Pesaro", and the 11th Field Artillery Regiment. On 17 March of the same year the two infantry brigades were replaced by the 1st, 2nd, 8th, and 9th Alpini Group. Over the course of the year the division received infantry and Bersaglieri units for month long stints in the front line trenches, but its core units remained Alpini groups. After the Battle of Mount Ortigara the 2nd Alpini Group was replaced by the 3rd Group on 9 July and on 20 July 1917 the I Alpini Grouping (1st, 3rd Group) and IV Alpini Grouping (8th, 9th Group) were formally activated.

After various changes due to the Italian retreat after the Battle of Caporetto and the reorganization of the Alpini corps, the division assumed its final organization on 6 March 1918:

| Division | Grouping | Group | Battalion | Regiment |
|---|---|---|---|---|
| 52nd Alpine Division | I Grouping | 1st Group | "Morbegno" | 5th Alpini |
| 52nd Alpine Division | I Grouping | 1st Group | "Tirano" | 5th Alpini |
| 52nd Alpine Division | I Grouping | 1st Group | "Monte Stelvio" | 5th Alpini |
| 52nd Alpine Division | I Grouping | 1st Group | XXX Mtn. Artillery Grp. | 2nd Mtn. Artillery |
| 52nd Alpine Division | I Grouping | 9th Group | "Verona" | 6th Alpini |
| 52nd Alpine Division | I Grouping | 9th Group | "Monte Baldo" | 6th Alpini |
| 52nd Alpine Division | I Grouping | 9th Group | "Bassano" | 6th Alpini |
| 52nd Alpine Division | I Grouping | 9th Group | "Sette Comuni" | 6th Alpini |
| 52nd Alpine Division | I Grouping | 9th Group | LIII Mtn. Artillery Grp. | 2nd Mtn. Artillery |
| 52nd Alpine Division | II Grouping | 5th Group | "Monte Spluga" | 5th Alpini |
| 52nd Alpine Division | II Grouping | 5th Group | "Valtellina" | 5th Alpini |
| 52nd Alpine Division | II Grouping | 5th Group | "Vestone" | 5th Alpini |
| 52nd Alpine Division | II Grouping | 5th Group | LVII Mtn. Artillery Grp. | 3rd Mtn. Artillery |
| 52nd Alpine Division | II Grouping | 10th Group | "Val d'Adige" | 6th Alpini |
| 52nd Alpine Division | II Grouping | 10th Group | "Vicenza" | 6th Alpini |
| 52nd Alpine Division | II Grouping | 10th Group | "Monte Berico" | 6th Alpini |
| 52nd Alpine Division | II Grouping | 10th Group | XXXII Mtn. Artillery Grp. | 3rd Mtn. Artillery |

==== 80th Alpine Division ====
The 80th Alpine Division was formed on 20 September 1918 with the VIII and IX Alpini Groupings and the 1st Mountain Artillery Grouping. Assigned to the XXX Army Corps for the last Italian offensive at Vittorio Veneto the division was deployed on the Monte Grappa massiv and tasked to conquer Col dell'Orso, Monte Casonet, Monte Fontanasecca and Monte Solarolo. Attacking on 24 October 1918 the division sustained heavy casualties and failed to meet its objectives until 31 October when the Austro-Hungarian forces began to retreat along the entire front. Until then the VIII Grouping alone had lost 88 officers and 3042 troops – nearly half its starting strength. The enemy's retreat allowed the battalions to advance and take the division's objectives and continue onward to the city of Feltre.

| Division | Grouping | Group | Battalion | Regiment |
|---|---|---|---|---|
| 80th Alpine Division | VIII Grouping | 6th Group | "Monte Levanna" | 4th Alpini |
| 80th Alpine Division | VIII Grouping | 6th Group | "Aosta" | 4th Alpini |
| 80th Alpine Division | VIII Grouping | 6th Group | "Val Toce" | 4th Alpini |
| 80th Alpine Division | VIII Grouping | 6th Group | III Mtn. Artillery Grp. | 1st Mtn. Artillery |
| 80th Alpine Division | VIII Grouping | 13th Group | "Val Cismon" | 7th Alpini |
| 80th Alpine Division | VIII Grouping | 13th Group | "Pieve di Cadore" | 7th Alpini |
| 80th Alpine Division | VIII Grouping | 13th Group | "Monte Antelao" | 7th Alpini |
| 80th Alpine Division | VIII Grouping | 13th Group | XXV Mtn. Artillery Grp. | 1st Mtn. Artillery |
| 80th Alpine Division | IX Grouping | 17th Group | "Exilles" | 3rd Alpini |
| 80th Alpine Division | IX Grouping | 17th Group | "Monte Suello" | 5th Alpini |
| 80th Alpine Division | IX Grouping | 17th Group | "Monte Pelmo" | 7th Alpini |
| 80th Alpine Division | IX Grouping | 17th Group | XV Mtn. Artillery Grp. | 1st Mtn. Artillery |
| 80th Alpine Division | IX Grouping | 20th Group | "Monte Saccarello" | 1st Alpini |
| 80th Alpine Division | IX Grouping | 20th Group | "Monte Cervino" | 4th Alpini |
| 80th Alpine Division | IX Grouping | 20th Group | "Cividale" | 8th Alpini |
| 80th Alpine Division | IX Grouping | 20th Group | XLVIII Mtn. Artillery Grp. | 3rd Mtn. Artillery |

==== Independent Groups ====
| Assigned to | Group | Battalion | Regiment |
|---|---|---|---|
| 9th Division | 4th Group | "Feltre" | 7th Alpini |
| 9th Division | 4th Group | "Monte Pavione" | 7th Alpini |
| 9th Division | 4th Group | "Monte Arvenis" | 8th Alpini |
| 9th Division | 4th Group | X Mtn. Artillery Grp. | 3rd Mtn. Artillery |

| Assigned to | Group | Battalion | Regiment |
|---|---|---|---|
| 21st Division | 18th Group | "Ivrea" | 4th Alpini |
| 21st Division | 18th Group | "Val Chiese" | 5th Alpini |
| 21st Division | 18th Group | "Monte Adamello" | 5th Alpini |
| 21st Division | 18th Group | XXII Mtn. Art. Grp. | 1st Mtn. Artillery |

=== Geographical Distribution ===
Alpini regiments and their battalions in 1915

== Mountain Artillery ==
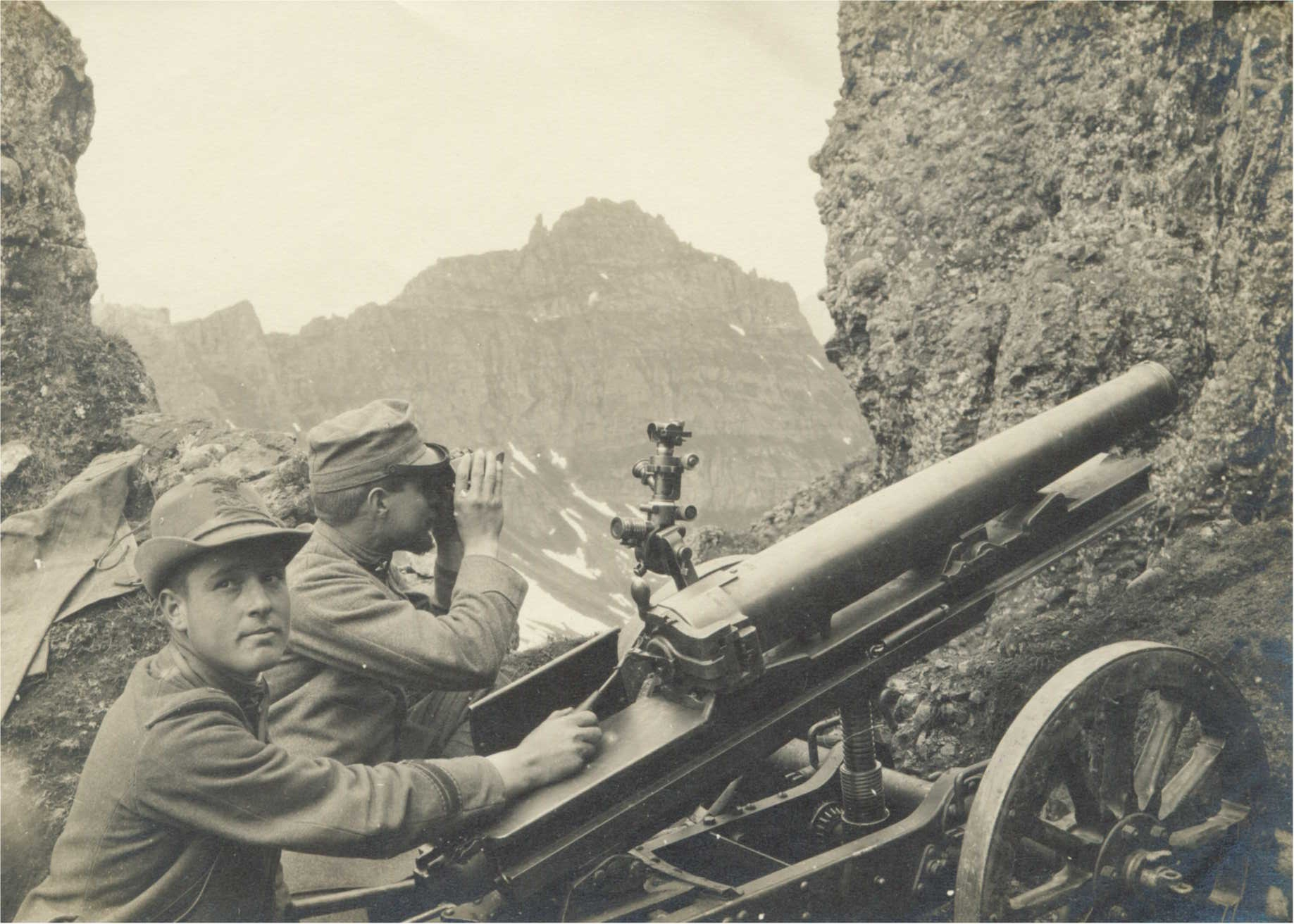
A Mountain artillery unit with a 65/17 mod. 13 cannon on Monte Padon firing at Austro-Hungarian positions on the Sass di Mezdi.

In 1914 the mountain artillery consisted of two regiments with five mountain artillery groups of three batteries each. Additionally each group stored the material for a fourth battery. The 1st Mountain Artillery Regiment was based in the West of Northern Italy and tasked to support the 1st, 2nd, 3rd, and 4th Alpini regiments, while the 2nd Mountain Artillery Regiment was based in the East of Northern Italy and tasked to support the 5th, 6th, 7th, and 8th Alpini regiments. With the rising of tensions the army began to expand the mountain artillery and on 1 February 1915 the 3rd Mountain Artillery Regiment was raised in Bergamo. It received the mountain artillery groups "Oneglia" and "Bergamo" from the other two regiments and was tasked to support the 1st and 4th Alpini Regiment. At the same time the 36th Field Artillery Regiment began to raise two additional mountain artillery groups.

After the outbreak of World War I in July 1914 an additional 11 mountain artillery batteries, numbered from 51 to 65, were raised from men, who had completed their military service in the preceding four years (i.e. completed it between 1910 and 1914). Each group of the mountain artillery regiments was supposed receive one of these batteries, however for lack of cannons the 53rd, 56th, 60th, and 62nd batteries were not raised until November 1916. Three of these batteries were raised by the 36th Field Artillery Regiment to create the XIV Mountain Artillery Group, the first of 53 mountain artillery batteries raised for the war.

Additionally seven batteries equipped with 70/15 cannons were part of the mountain artillery, with six of these deployed in the Italian colonies (41st, 42nd, 43rd in Libya) and one attached to 1st Army. The latter of these batteries was designated 4th Special Battery, while the other six were numbered 41st to 46th.

At the end of 1916 the mountain artillery had grown to 25 groups (I to XXIV, and XXVIII) with 82 batteries, which were numbered from 1 to 81, as the 4th Special Battery was not included in the sequential numbering of mountain artillery batteries. The mountain artillery continued to suffer from a lack of materiel as the army preferred to raise "batterie someggiatti" (loosely translated: pack animal carrying batteries) with the available 65/17 mod. 13 cannons. A mountain artillery battery required 195 horses and mules compared to 137 for a "batteria someggiatta" and therefore the army directed the available cannons to field artillery regiments tasked with raising of the latter type of batteries. In first year of the war 66 "batterie someggiatti" were raised compared to 25 mountain artillery batteries.

In 1917 the mountain artillery added a further six groups (XXV to XXVII, XXIX to XXXI) and 18 batteries for a new total of 31 groups and 100 batteries with 379 65/17 mod. 13 cannons. The size of the mountain artillery doubled in size in early 1918 when all the remaining 84 "batterie someggiatti" and associated groups were reformed as mountain artillery batteries.

=== Operational Deployment ===
Mountain artillery batteries were initially often deployed alone or in twos. As the war progressed the mountain artillery groups were deployed in regiment-sized Groupings (Raggruppamento Artiglieria da Montagna), which numbered twelve by the war's end (1° to 12°). From early 1918 onward each Alpini group received a mountain artillery group, while each Alpini grouping received a mountain artillery grouping with two mountains artillery groups. Thus 38 mountain artillery groups were permanently assigned to Alpini groups and groupings, with the remaining groups assigned to divisions and army corps.

=== 1st Mountain Artillery Regiment ===
The 1st Mountain Artillery Regiment was based in Turin and recruited in Piedmont and the Aosta Valley. Three of the regiment's four groups were based in Turin – a fact reflected in the names of the groups, which combined the Italian name of the city "Torino" with the names of the Alpini battalions they were assigned to support. Only the "Mondovì" Group was based outside Turin. Until 1 February 1915 the regiment also included the depot in Oneglia with the Mountain Artillery Group "Oneglia", which both were transferred on that date to the newly formed 3rd Mountain Artillery Regiment.

During the war the regiment's depots raised and trained the commands of nine mountain artillery groupings ("Raggruppamento Artiglieria Montagna"), the commands of 17 mountain artillery groups ("Gruppo Artiglieria Montagna"), and 37 mountain artillery batteries, which were each equipped with four 65/17 mod. 13 cannons. Furthermore, two commands of siege groups ("Gruppo d'Assedio"), and 14 siege batteries were raised and trained by the regiment.

- The regiment raised the following mountain artillery groupings: 1°, 2°, 3°, 4°, 5°, 9°, 10°, 11°, and 12°.
- The regiment raised the following mountain artillery groups: XV (66th, 67th, 68th bty.), XIX (14th, 51st, 55th bty.), XXII (47th, 48th, 49th bty.), XXV (82nd, 83rd, 84th bty.), XXIX (91st, 92nd, 93rd bty.), XXXIII, XXXIV, XXXV, XXXVII, XXXVIII, XXXIX, XLIII, XLIV, LII, LVIII, LXII, and LXV.

During the war the regiment's groups fought:

- in 1915 in the battles of Col di Lana, Monte Sief, Valsugana, Monte Nero, Monte Javorcek, and Coston del Mrzli
- in 1916 in the battles of Col di Lana, Monte Sief, Monte Cauriol, Monte Cardinal, Busa Alta, Monte Pasubio, Monte Corno, Monte Sleme, and Monte Mrzli
- in 1917 in the battles of Liga, Brodez, Monte Zebio, Bainsizza, Spinoncia, Monte Asolone, Colle dell'Orso, Monte Solarolo, Monte Pasubio, Monte Cucco, and Monte Vodice
- in 1918 in the battles of Spinoncia, Monte Solarolo, Archeson, Conca di Schiavino, Monte Grappa, Monte Valderoa, Conca di Feltre, Passo del Monticello, and Passo Tonale

At the outbreak of war the mountain artillery groups lost their names and were numbered with Roman numerals instead. In the table below these Roman numerals are preceding the groups' names in brackets.

1st Mountain Artillery Regiment, in Turin
| Turin Depot | Mondovì Depot |
|---|---|
| (I) Mountain Artillery Group "Torino-Susa": 1st Mountain Artillery Battery; 2nd Mountain Artillery Battery; 3rd Mountain Artillery Battery; 51st Mountain Artillery Battery | (IV) Mountain Artillery Group "Mondovì": 10th Mountain Artillery Battery; 11th Mountain Artillery Battery; 12th Mountain Artillery Battery; 54th Mountain Artillery Battery |
| (II) Mountain Artillery Group "Torino-Aosta": 4th Mountain Artillery Battery; 5th Mountain Artillery Battery; 6th Mountain Artillery Battery; 52nd Mountain Artillery Battery | |
| (III) Mountain Artillery Group "Torino-Pinerolo": 7th Mountain Artillery Battery; 8th Mountain Artillery Battery; 9th Mountain Artillery Battery; ^{Note 1} | |

Note 1: The group's 53rd Mountain Artillery Battery was not raised until November 1916 for lack of available 65/17 mod. 13 cannons.

=== 2nd Mountain Artillery Regiment ===
The 2nd Mountain Artillery Regiment was based in Vicenza and recruited in the Veneto. Until 1 February 1915 the regiment also included the depot in Bergamo with the Mountain Artillery Group "Bergamo", which both were transferred on that date to the newly formed 3rd Mountain Artillery Regiment.

During the war the regiment's depots raised and trained the commands of two mountain artillery groupings ("Raggruppamento Artiglieria Montagna"), the commands of 13 mountain artillery groups ("Gruppo Artiglieria Montagna"), and 35 mountain artillery batteries, which were each equipped with four 65/17 mod. 13 cannons. Furthermore, five commands of siege groups ("Gruppo d'Assedio"), and 21 siege batteries were raised and trained by the regiment.

- The regiment raised the following mountain artillery groupings: 6° and 8°.
- The regiment raised the following mountain artillery groups: XVI (69th, 70th, 71st bty.), XXI (78th, 79th, 80th, 81st bty), XXIII (50th, 53rd bty.), XXVI (85th, 86th, 87th bty.), XXVIII, XXX (94th, 95th, 96th bty.), XLIX, LIII, LIV, LXI, LXIII, LXIV, and LXVII.

During the war the regiment's groups fought:

- in 1915 in the battles of Pal Piccolo, Pal Grande, Freikofel, Tolmino, Bučenica and Mengore, Monte Matassone, Monte Pozzacchio, Monte Coston, Tre Cime di Lavaredo, Monte Piana, Sexten Valley, and Monte Croce Comelico
- in 1916 in the battles of Pal Piccolo, Pal Grande, Zellonkofel, Sabotino, Monte Cengio, Monte Novegno, Veliki Hribach, Monte Maronia, Monte Majo, San Gabriele, Pečinka, and Passo Sentinella
- in 1917 in the battles of Monte Kuk, Monte Vodice, Bainsizza, Castagnevizza, Monte Tomba, Pečinka, Veliki Hribach, Cima Forame, Monte Piana, Stretta di Quero, and Monte Solarolo
- in 1918 in the battles of Montello, Piana della Sernaglia, Monte Asolone, Monte Palone, Valle del Sarca, Val Calcino, and Monte Grappa

At the outbreak of war the mountain artillery groups lost their names and were numbered with Roman numerals instead. In the table below these Roman numerals are preceding the groups' names in brackets.

2nd Mountain Artillery Regiment, in Vicenza
| Conegliano Depot | Udine Depot | Vicenza Depot | Belluno Depot |
|---|---|---|---|
| (V) Mountain Artillery Group "Conegliano": 13th Mountain Artillery Battery; 14th Mountain Artillery Battery; 15th Mountain Artillery Battery; 55th Mountain Artillery Battery | (VI) Mountain Artillery Group "Udine": 16th Mountain Artillery Battery; 17th Mountain Artillery Battery; 18th Mountain Artillery Battery; ^{Note 2} | (VII) Mountain Artillery Group "Vicenza": 19th Mountain Artillery Battery; 20th Mountain Artillery Battery; 21st Mountain Artillery Battery; 57th Mountain Artillery Battery | (VIII) Mountain Artillery Group "Belluno": 22nd Mountain Artillery Battery; 23rd Mountain Artillery Battery; 24th Mountain Artillery Battery; 58th Mountain Artillery Battery |

Note 2: The group's 56th Mountain Artillery Battery was not raised until November 1916 for lack of available 65/17 mod. 13 cannons.

=== 3rd Mountain Artillery Regiment ===
The 3rd Mountain Artillery Regiment was raised on 1 February 1915 in Bergamo. The regiment received the depot in Bergamo with the Mountain Artillery Group "Bergamo" from the 2nd Mountain Artillery Regiment and the depot in Oneglia with the Mountain Artillery Group "Oneglia" from the 1st Mountain Artillery Regiment. The new regiment recruited in Lombardy and Liguria.

During the war the regiment's depots raised and trained the commands of one mountain artillery grouping ("Raggruppamento Artiglieria Montagna"), the commands of 17 mountain artillery groups ("Gruppo Artiglieria Montagna"), and 44 mountain artillery batteries, which were each equipped with four 65/17 mod. 13 cannons. Furthermore, two commands of siege groups ("Gruppo d'Assedio"), and 19 siege batteries were raised and trained by the regiment.

- The regiment raised the following mountain artillery grouping: 7°.
- The regiment raised the following mountain artillery groups: XVII (72nd, 73rd, 74th bty.), XVIII (75th, 76th, 77th bty.), XXIV (56th, 60th, 62nd bty.), XXVII (88th, 89th, 90th bty.), XXXI (97th, 98th, 99th bty.), XXXII, XL, XLV, XLVI, XLVII, XLVIII, LV, LVI, LVII, LIX, LX, and LXVI.

During the war the regiment's groups fought:

- in 1915 in the battles of Val d'Assa, Monte Coston, Monte Altissimo, Brentonico, Monte Nero, Monte Mrzli, Sass de Stria, and Monte Piana
- in 1916 in the battles of Castel Dante, Melette, Monte Fior, Zugna, Passo Buole, Monte Nero, and Tofane
- in 1917 in the battles of Monte Nero, Monte Zebio, zeCastagnevizza, Monte Tomba, Monfenera, Cimone d'Arsiero, Val d'Astico, Piccolo Lagazuoi, and Monte Grappa
- in 1918 in the battles of Fagarè, Monte Pelle, Vallagarina, Cima Presena, Passo del Monticello, Passo Cavento, Roncade, Monte Coston, Monte Grappa, Montello, and Vittorio Veneto

At the outbreak of war the mountain artillery groups lost their names and were numbered with Roman numerals instead. In the table below these Roman numerals are preceding the groups' names in brackets.

3rd Mountain Artillery Regiment, in Bergamo
| Oneglia Depot | Genova Depot | Bergamo Depot | Como Depot |
|---|---|---|---|
| (IX) Mountain Artillery Group "Oneglia": 25th Mountain Artillery Battery; 26th Mountain Artillery Battery; 27th Mountain Artillery Battery; 59th Mountain Artillery Battery | (X) Mountain Artillery Group "Genova": 28th Mountain Artillery Battery; 29th Mountain Artillery Battery; 30th Mountain Artillery Battery; ^{Note 3} | (XI) Mountain Artillery Group "Bergamo": 31st Mountain Artillery Battery; 32nd Mountain Artillery Battery; 33rd Mountain Artillery Battery; 61st Mountain Artillery Battery | (XII) Mountain Artillery Group "Como": 34th Mountain Artillery Battery; 35th Mountain Artillery Battery; 36th Mountain Artillery Battery; ^{Note 3} |

Note 3: The "Genova" group's 60th Mountain Artillery Battery and the "Como" group's 62nd Mountain Artillery Battery were not raised until November 1916 for lack of available 65/17 mod. 13 cannons.

=== 36th Field Artillery Regiment ===
The 36th Field Artillery Regiment in Southern Italy raised two mountain artillery groups. One the Mountain Artillery Group "Messina" fielded three mountain artillery batteries of the permanent army, while the XIV Group fielded three of the batteries activated in spring 1915 with reservists. During the war the regiment's depot raised and trained a further two mountain artillery groups (XX (22nd, 33rd, 59th bty.) and LI), and 13 mountain artillery batteries.

36th Artillery Regiment, in Messina
Messina Depot
(XIII) Mountain Artillery Group "Messina"
- 37th Mountain Artillery Battery
- 38th Mountain Artillery Battery
- 39th Mountain Artillery Battery
XIV Mountain Artillery Group
- 63rd Mountain Artillery Battery
- 64th Mountain Artillery Battery
- 65th Mountain Artillery Battery

=== Other regiments ===
A further four mountain artillery groups were raised by two field artillery regiments: the 18th Field Artillery Regiment raised the XLI Mountain Artillery Group, while the 30th Field Artillery Regiment raised the XLII and L Mountain Artillery Groups with their respective batteries.

=== Geographical Distribution ===
Mountain artillery regiments and their groups in 1915
