= Setteville =

- Comune
- Comune di Setteville
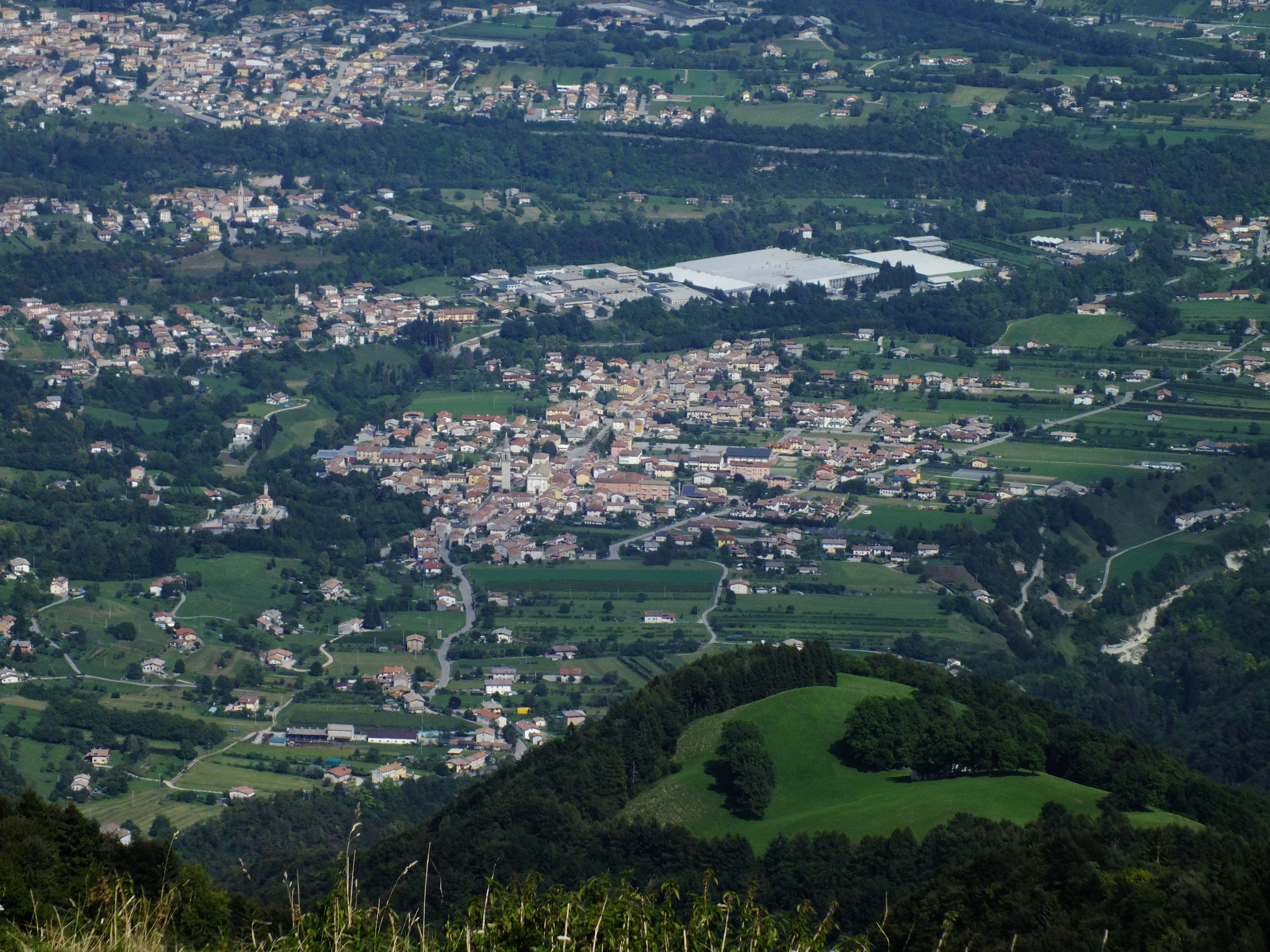
- Alano di Piave (centre) and Quero (top left corner), viewed from the west

- Location of Setteville in the province of Belluno

- Location within Italy Location within Veneto
- Coordinates: 45°55′22″N 11°55′57″E
- Country: Italy
- Region: Veneto
- Province: Belluno

Government
  - Mayor: Bruno Zanolla

Area
  - Total: 82.01 km^{2} (31.66 sq mi)
- Elevation: 288 m (945 ft)

Population (1 January 2024)
  - Total: 5,823
  - Density: 71.00/km^{2} (183.9/sq mi)
- Time zone: UTC+1 (CET)
  - Summer (DST): UTC+2 (CEST)
- Postal code: 32038
- Dialing code: 0439
- Website: Official website

Setteville is a comune located in the province of Belluno, in the region of Veneto in northern Italy. It was established in January 2024 from the merger of Alano di Piave and Quero Vas. It is located about 34 km (21 mi) southwest of the provincial capital of Belluno.

== Geography ==
Setteville is located on the Piave River where it cuts through the Bellunes Alps between Monte Grappa and Monte Cesen. It borders the comuni of Feltre to the north, Borgo Valbelluna to the northeast, Segusino to the east, Valdobbiadene to the southeast, Pederobba and Cavaso del Tomba to the south, Possagno and Pieve del Grappa to the southwest, and Seren del Grappa to the northwest.

== History ==
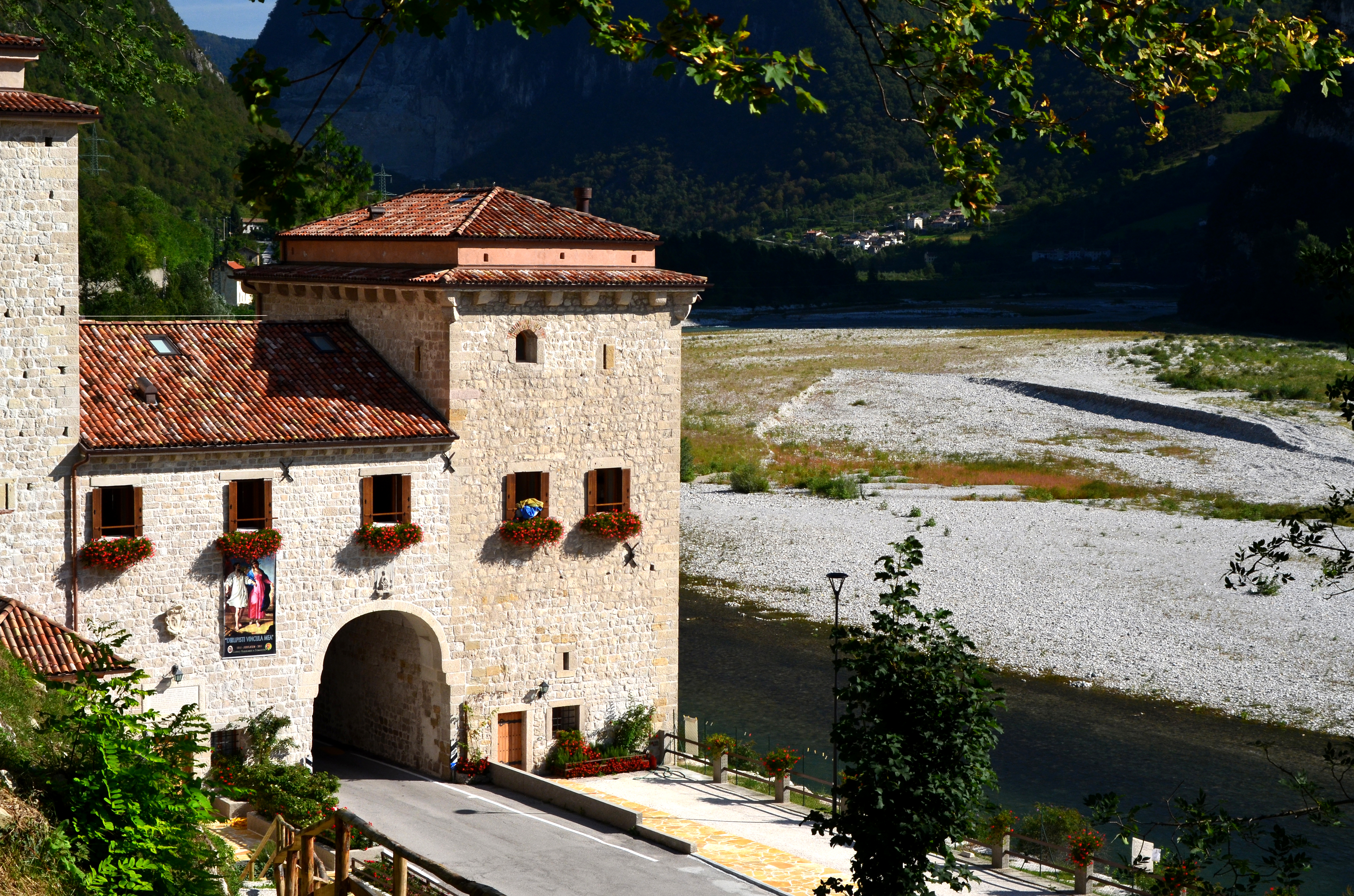
The Castello di Quero on the right bank of the Piave river.

The strategic location of Setteville led to its settlement in Roman times and influenced the subsequent history of the area. In 1377 the Venetians built the Castello di Quero on the Piave, which remains a local landmark. In the 17th century, the area prospered from the development of the textile and paper industries. Both world wars profoundly impacted the area: the town of Quero was completely destroyed in 1917 in the First Battle of the Piave River, and the Nazis destroyed the hamlet of Schievenin in 1944 when carrying out reprisals against Italian partisans in Operation Piave.

In December 2000, the comuni of Quero, Vas and Segusino formed a municipal union, the Unione dei Comuni del Basso Feltrino – Sette Ville. Segusino withdrew from the union in September 2002, and Alano di Piave joined the union in October 2012. On 28 December 2013 Quero and Vas merged to form the new municipality of Quero Vas. The citizens of Alano di Piave and Quero voted to merge the two comuni on 29–30 October 2023. The Regional Council of Veneto published the law effecting the merger on 29 December 2023, which went into effect on 22 January 2024.

== Economy and infrastructure ==
In recent decades, the communities of Setteville have achieved a high level of economic development connected with the flourishing of new artisanal and industrial activities, although this is endangered by a persistent decline in population.

Regional highway 348 runs north to south through the comune along the west bank of the Piave, connecting it to Feltre in the north, and to Montebelluna and Treviso in the south.
