= Dolje =

Dolje may refer to:

- Dolje, Slovenia
- Dolje, a neighbourhood within the Podsljeme district of Zagreb, Croatia
