= Tonale =

Tonale may refer to:

- Alfa Romeo Tonale, a small SUV introduced in 2022
- Monte Tonale, Lombardy, Italy
  - Tonale Pass
- Tonale, older name for a tonary
