= Altissimo (disambiguation) =

Altissimo (Italian, 'very high', feminine form: altissima) is the uppermost register on woodwind instruments.

Altissimo may also refer to:

- Altissimo (album), by Gary Bartz, Lee Konitz, Jackie McLean and Charlie Mariano, 1973
- Altissimo, Veneto, a place in Italy
- Monte Altissimo, a mountain in the Bergamasque Prealps, Italy
- Cristofano dell'Altissimo (c. 1525–1605), an Italian painter
- Renato Altissimo (1940–2015), an Italian politician
- in altissimo, singing above the note F_{6}

== See also ==
- in alt, singing in the octave above the treble staff, G_{5} to F_{6}
