= Vas, Veneto =

Frazione in Veneto, Italy

Vas
- Frazione
- Location of Vas in Italy
- Coordinates: 45°56′N 11°56′E
- Country: Italy
- Region: Veneto
- Province: Province of Belluno (BL)
- Comune: Vas

Area
  - Total: 17.8 km^{2} (6.9 sq mi)

Population (Dec. 2004)
  - Total: 909
  - Density: 51.1/km^{2} (132/sq mi)
- Time zone: UTC+1 (CET)
  - Summer (DST): UTC+2 (CEST)
- Postal code: 32030
- Dialing code: 0439

Vas is a frazione of Quero Vas and a former comune (municipality) in the province of Belluno in the Italian region of Veneto, located about 60 kilometres (37 mi) northwest of Venice and about 30 kilometres (19 mi) southwest of Belluno. As of 31 December 2004, it had a population of 909 and an area of 17.8 square kilometres (6.9 mi^{2}).

The municipality of Vas contained the frazioni (subdivisions, mainly villages and hamlets) Marziai and Caorera.

Vas bordered the following municipalities: Feltre, Lentiai, Quero, Segusino, Valdobbiadene.

On 28 December 2013 Vas merged with Quero to form the new municipality of Quero Vas.

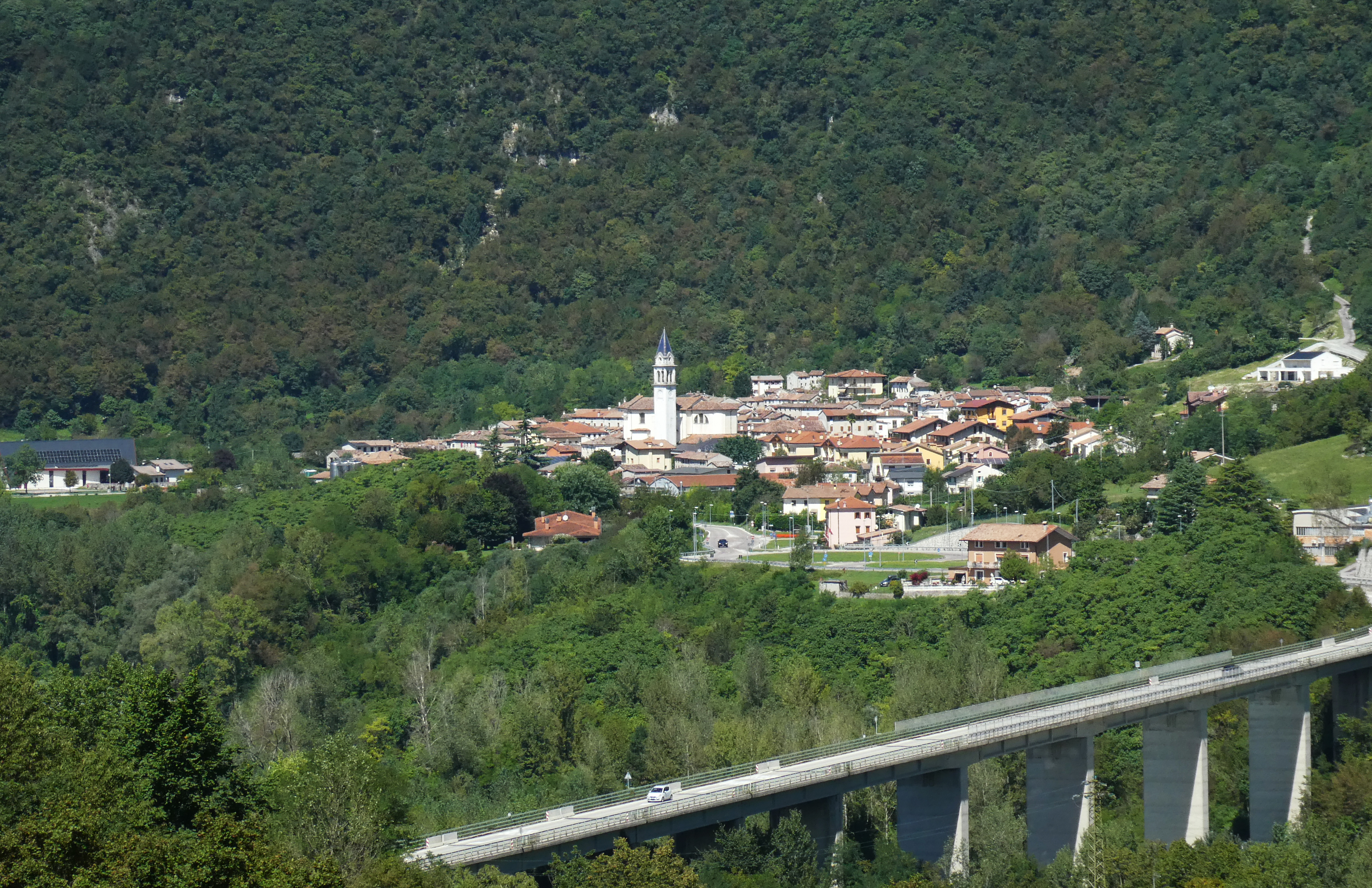
Vas (Setteville, Veneto, Italy)

== Demographic evolution ==
Historical population

Year	Pop.	±%
1861	?	—
1871	1,179	—
1881	1,215	+3.1%
1901	1,504	+23.8%
1911	1,653	+9.9%

Year	Pop.	±%
1921	1,743	+5.4%
1931	1,594	−8.5%
1936	1,434	−10.0%
1951	1,467	+2.3%
1961	1,274	−13.2%

Year	Pop.	±%
1971	948	−25.6%
1981	879	−7.3%
1991	805	−8.4%
2001	864	+7.3%

Source: Data from ISTAT
