= Alano di Piave =

- Comune
- Comune di Alano di Piave
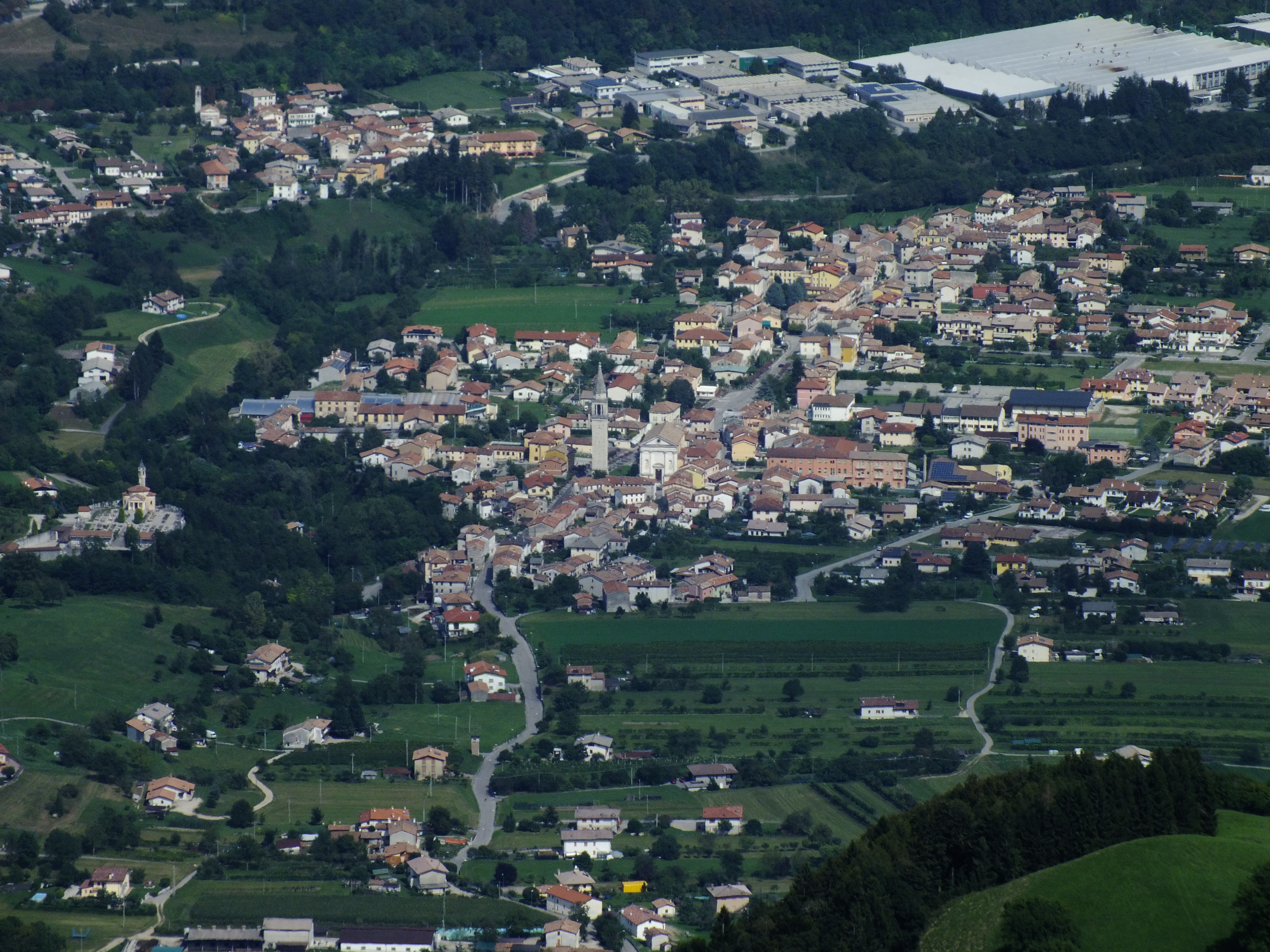
- Aerial view of Alano di Piave

- Location within Italy Location within Veneto
- Coordinates: 45°54′N 11°55′E
- Country: Italy
- Region: Veneto
- Province: Belluno (BL)

Area
  - Total: 36.4 km^{2} (14.1 sq mi)
- Elevation: 308 m (1,010 ft)

Population (Dec. 2021)
  - Total: 2,665
  - Density: 73.2/km^{2} (190/sq mi)
- Demonym: Alanesi
- Time zone: UTC+1 (CET)
  - Summer (DST): UTC+2 (CEST)
- Postal code: 32031
- Dialing code: 0439
- Website: Official website

Alano di Piave is a former comune (municipality) in the province of Belluno in the Italian region of Veneto, located about 60 kilometres (37 mi) northwest of Venice and about 35 kilometres (22 mi) southwest of Belluno. As of 31 December 2021, it had a population of 2,665 and an area of 36.4 square kilometres (14.1 mi^{2}). On January 22, 2024, it merged with Quero Vas to form the municipality of Setteville.

== History ==
The earliest known reference to Alano dates to the 8th century. According to some scholars, the name derives from the Alans, a nomadic people who migrated south from Northern Europe. Others attribute the origin to the region's historical involvement in wool processing, once a widespread activity in the area.

From the 10th and 11th centuries, documentation of Alano becomes more frequent. The inconsistencies found in contemporary maps reflect the frequent changes in governance, as control of Alano and its surrounding territories shifted between the lords of Feltre and Treviso. The population endured prolonged conflicts that continued into the early 16th century, notably during the War of the League of Cambrai, fought over possession of the fortress of Castelnuovo, a 14th-century stronghold overseeing both road and river routes.

Beginning in the early 16th century, Alano experienced roughly three centuries of relative stability and prosperity. Due to the region's difficult terrain and limited agricultural productivity, the inhabitants focused primarily on sheep farming and craft industries such as wool and iron working and lime production. The nearby Piave River supported trade and contributed to the growth of Fener as a modest commercial center.

During the First World War, Alano was located within a neutral zone and suffered extensive damage from both Austrian and Italian artillery. In the aftermath, many residents emigrated to Europe and the Americas, continuing a trend that had begun in the 19th century. The Second World War brought further devastation, followed by another wave of emigration, particularly to Belgium, Germany, and France.

== Monuments and places of interest ==
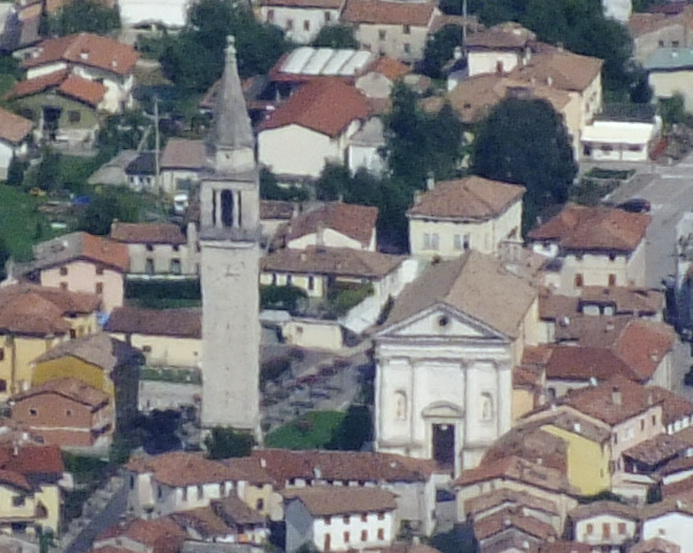
Parish church

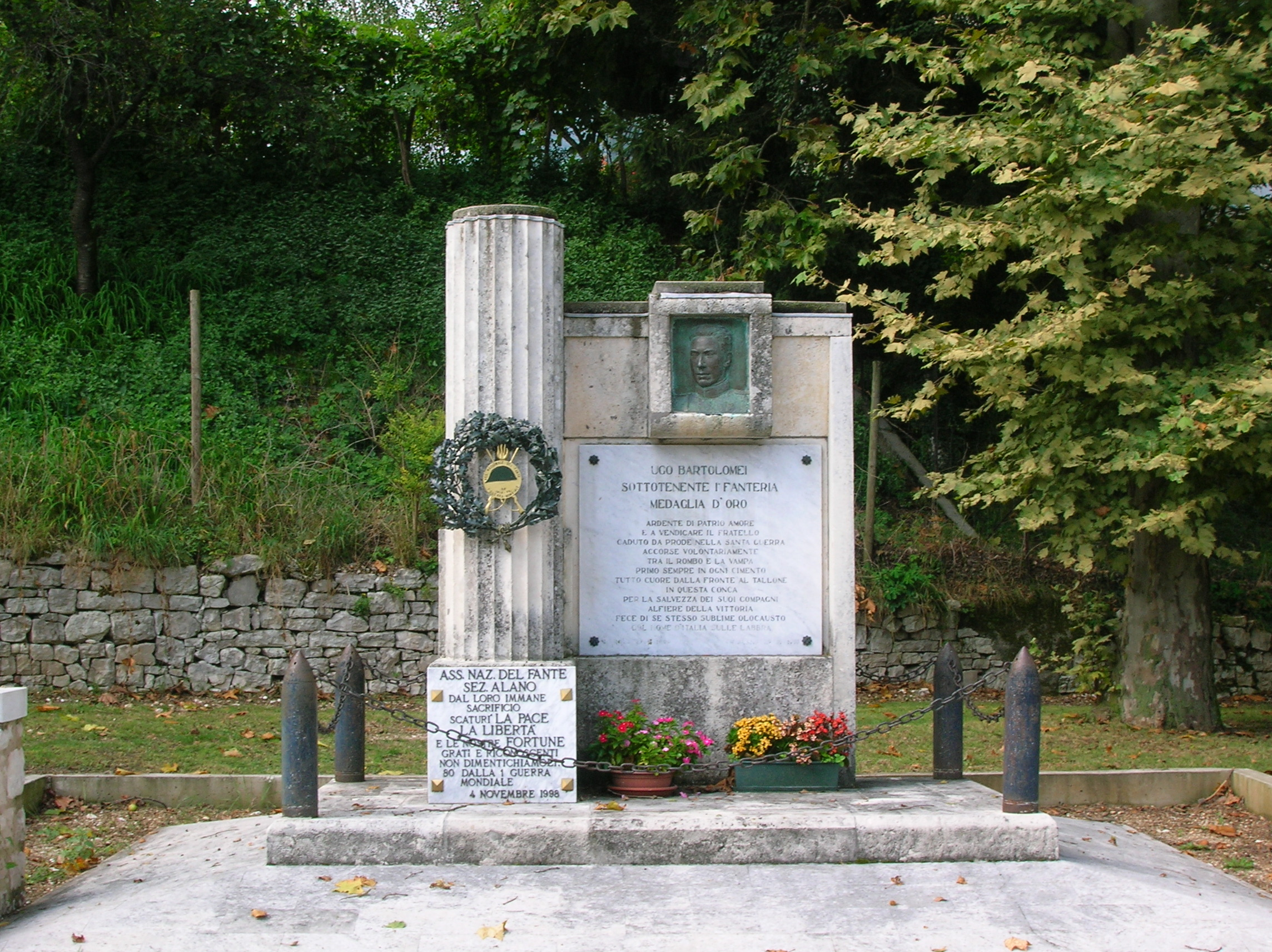
Military monument to Ugo Bartolomei

- Parish Church of Sant'Antonio Abate

The parish of Alano di Piave is inserted in the vicariate of Quero-Valdobbiadene, part of the diocese of Padua.

Originally, the main church of Alano was that of San Pietro, mentioned for the first time in the papal tenth of 1297 as a dependency of the parish church of Quero. The pastoral visit of 1535 attests to the transfer of the Blessed Sacrament and the baptismal font to the church of Sant'Antonio Abate, in a more central position, which since then has become the place of worship of reference for the town.

Until the reconstruction of 1760-1778, concluded with the consecration of 1792, it maintained the ownership of both saints. The bell tower was built in the second half of the 19th century. Severely damaged during the Great War, it was promptly restored.

At the back of the presbytery there is a Madonna and Child in glory and saints, a canvas by an anonymous Venetian from the second half of the eighteenth century. To the right of the high altar is a praying Angel in carved and painted wood, made in the first half of the 20th century by an unknown artist. In the first chapel on the left stands a statue of St. Anthony of Padua with baby Jesus, sculpted by Gabriele Brunelli in the second half of the seventeenth century.

== Demographic evolution ==
Historical population

Year	Pop.	±%
1861	?	—
1871	3,036	—
1881	3,196	+5.3%
1901	3,689	+15.4%
1911	3,532	−4.3%
1921	3,645	+3.2%

Year	Pop.	±%
1931	3,695	+1.4%
1936	3,169	−14.2%
1951	3,399	+7.3%
1961	3,030	−10.9%
1971	2,557	−15.6%
1981	2,499	−2.3%

Year	Pop.	±%
1991	2,521	+0.9%
2001	2,773	+10.0%
2011	2,917	+5.2%
2021	2,665	−8.6%

Source: Data from ISTAT

=== Foreign ethnic groups and minorities ===
As of 31 December 2022, there were 400 foreign residents in the municipality, or 14.8% of the population. The most consistent groups are listed below:

1. China, 121
2. Morocco, 92
3. Dominican Republic, 36
4. Ukraine, 26
5. Romania, 19
6. Croatia, 17

In percentage terms, Alano di Piave is the first municipality in the province for the number of foreign residents.

== Economy ==
A part of the inhabitants is still dedicated to agriculture and livestock. Cereals, vegetables, fodder, vines and orchards are grown and cattle, pigs, goats, sheep, horses and poultry are raised. In recent years Alano has experienced a significant increase in craft activities, particularly in the eyewear, chandeliers and carpentry sectors. The town has only one hotel, three restaurants and a holiday home which, born as a cultural center, now hosts artists and the elderly. The industrial sector is present with the food, textile, construction, wood, clothing, metal products, agricultural machinery and furniture sectors.

== Infrastructure and transport ==
=== Streets ===
The village is crossed by the 348 Feltrina state road.

An inhabitant of the hamlet of Fener is a frequent presence on the southern lane of regional road 348 to the point of ending up mapped on Google Maps and has been included as a "tourist attraction".

=== Railways ===
The town is served by the Alano-Fener-Valdobbiadene station on the Calalzo-Padua railway.
