= Cesen =

Mountain in Italy

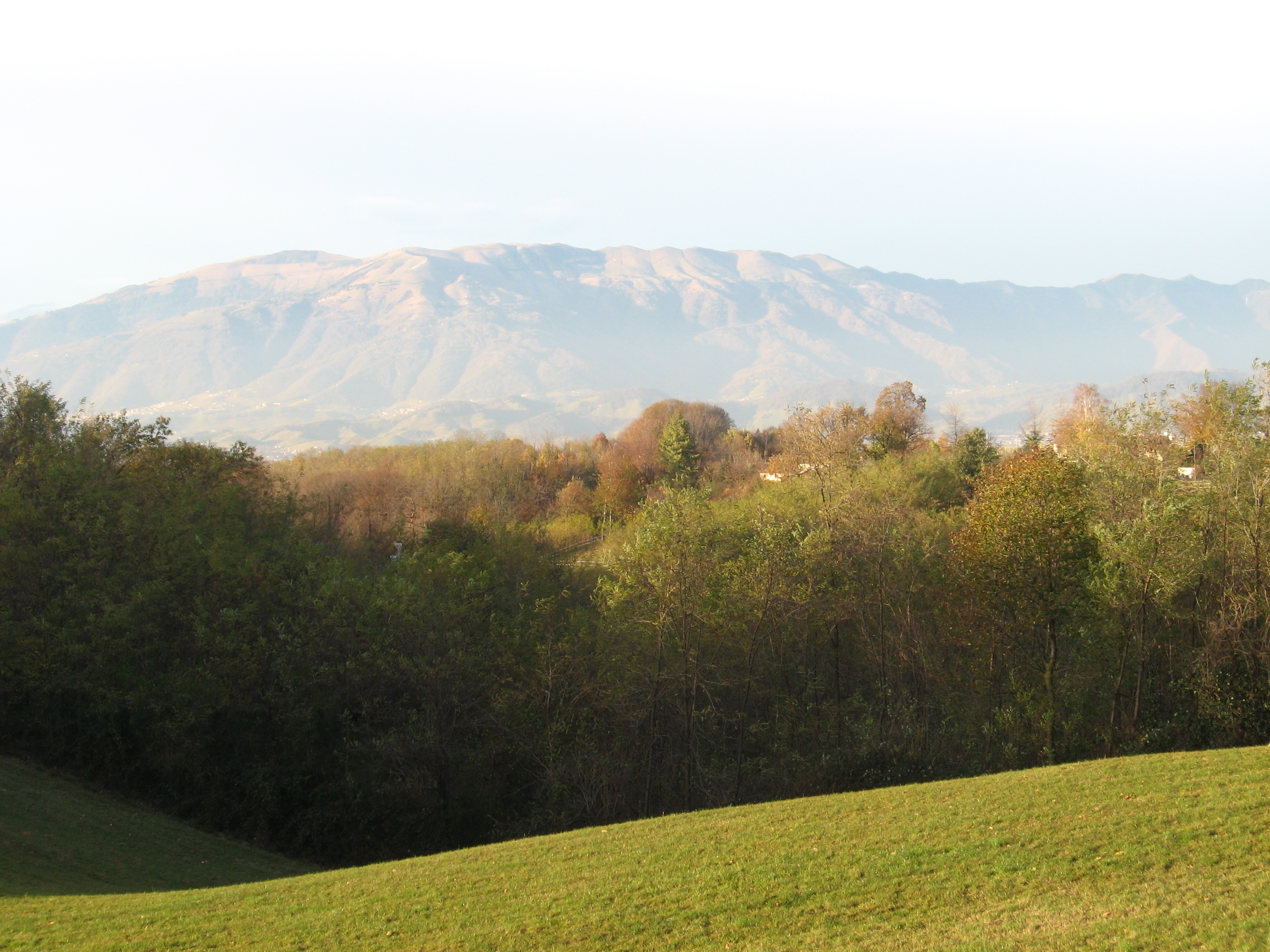

Highest point
- Elevation: 1,570 m (5,150 ft)
- Prominence: 869 m (2,851 ft)
- Coordinates: 45°56′49″N 12°00′38″E

Geography
- Location within Italy
- Location: Veneto, Italy

Cesen is a mountain of the Veneto, Italy. It has an elevation of 1,570 metres. Also called Mt. Cesen, it was the scene of fighting during World War I. Monte Cesen is a destination for mountain hiking and paragliding.

== See also ==
- Alpini and mountain artillery formations in World War I
- Pieve di Soligo
- Setteville
