= Quero Vas =

Quero Vas Cuero Vas
- Comune
- Comune di Quero Vas
- Location within Italy Location within Veneto
- Coordinates: 45°55′22″N 11°55′57″E
- Country: Italy
- Region: Veneto
- Province: Belluno (BL)

Area
  - Total: 45.92 km^{2} (17.73 sq mi)

Population (31 December 2015)
  - Total: 3,237
  - Density: 70.49/km^{2} (182.6/sq mi)
- Time zone: UTC+1 (CET)
  - Summer (DST): UTC+2 (CEST)
- Postal code: 32038
- Dialing code: 0439
- Website: Official website

Quero Vas (Venetian: Cuero Vas) is a former comune (municipality) in the Province of Belluno in the Italian region Veneto.

It was established on 28 December 2013 by the merger of the municipalities of Quero and Vas. Then, in 2024, it merged with Alano di Piave to form Setteville.
