= Monte Cauriol =

Mountain in Italy

Coordinates: 46°14′07″N 11°35′47″E

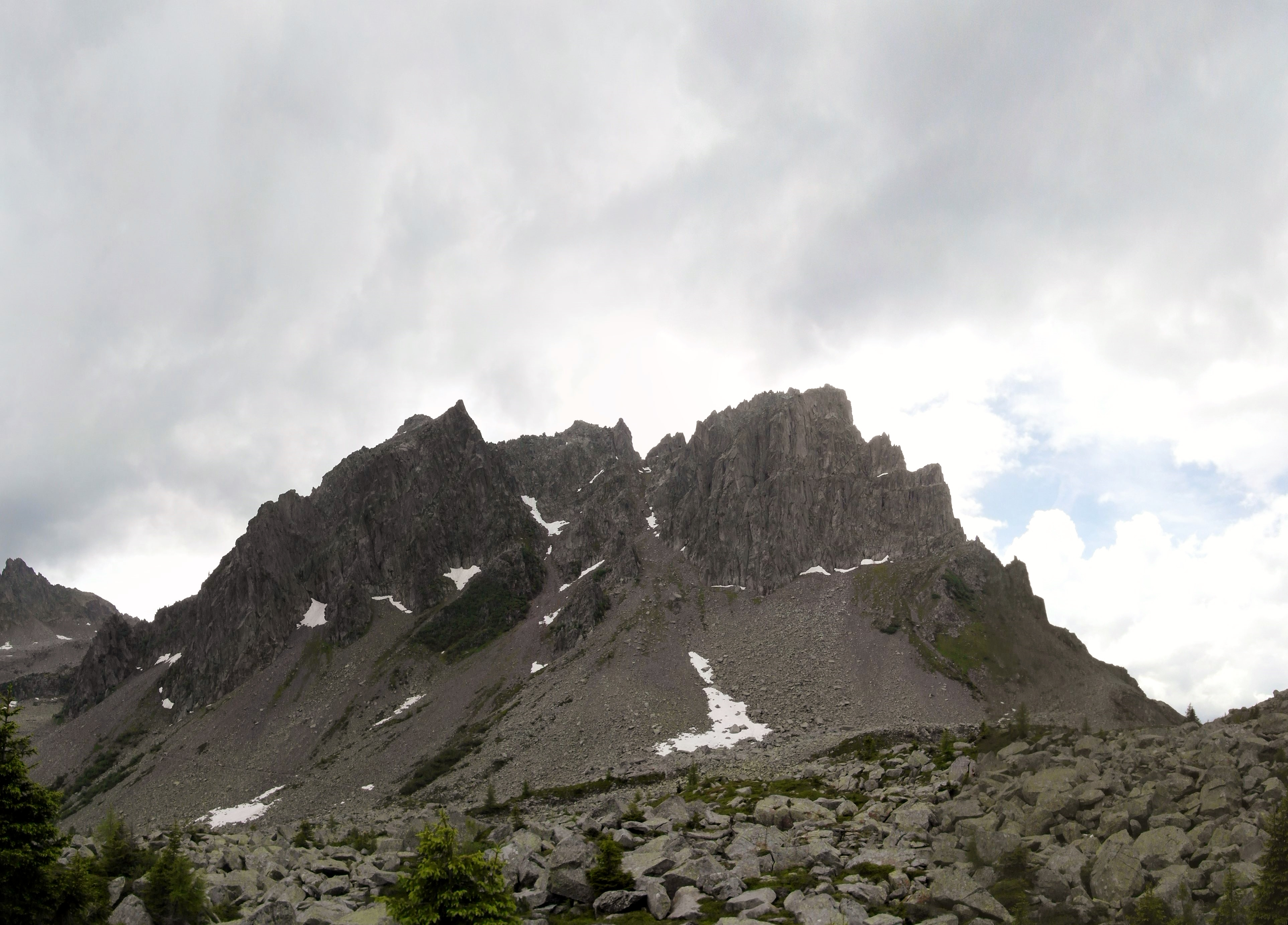

Highest point
- Elevation: 2,494 m (8,182 ft)

Geography
- Location: Trentino, Italy
- Parent range: Lagorai

Monte Cauriol is a mountain of Trentino, Italy, with an elevation of 2,494 metres (8,182 ft). Part of the Lagorai range, it is located in the eastern part of the Province of Trento, between the Val di Fiemme and the Val Vanoi.

The mountain was the theatre of bitter fighting during the First World War; initially held by the Austro-Hungarians, after three unsuccessful Italian assaults it was finally taken by the Alpini on 27 August 1916. It returned to Austro-Hungarian hands in late October 1917, when the Italians were forced to evacuate the entire region to avoid encirclement in the wake of the battle of Caporetto. It is estimated that 10,000 soldiers were killed on Monte Cauriol during the war, many of them by the bitter cold and avalanches rather than by enemy action. Monte Cauriol is also the title of one of the traditional Alpini songs.

Hiking paths from Rifugio Refavaie (near Caoria) and Rifugio Cauriol (near Ziano di Fiemme) lead to the peak, where a summit cross and plaques commemorating the fallen in World War I can be found. The panorama from the peak includes the Sella group, Rosengarten, Latemar, the Cinque Torri and Cima d’Asta.
