= Monte Scorluzzo =

Mountain in Italy

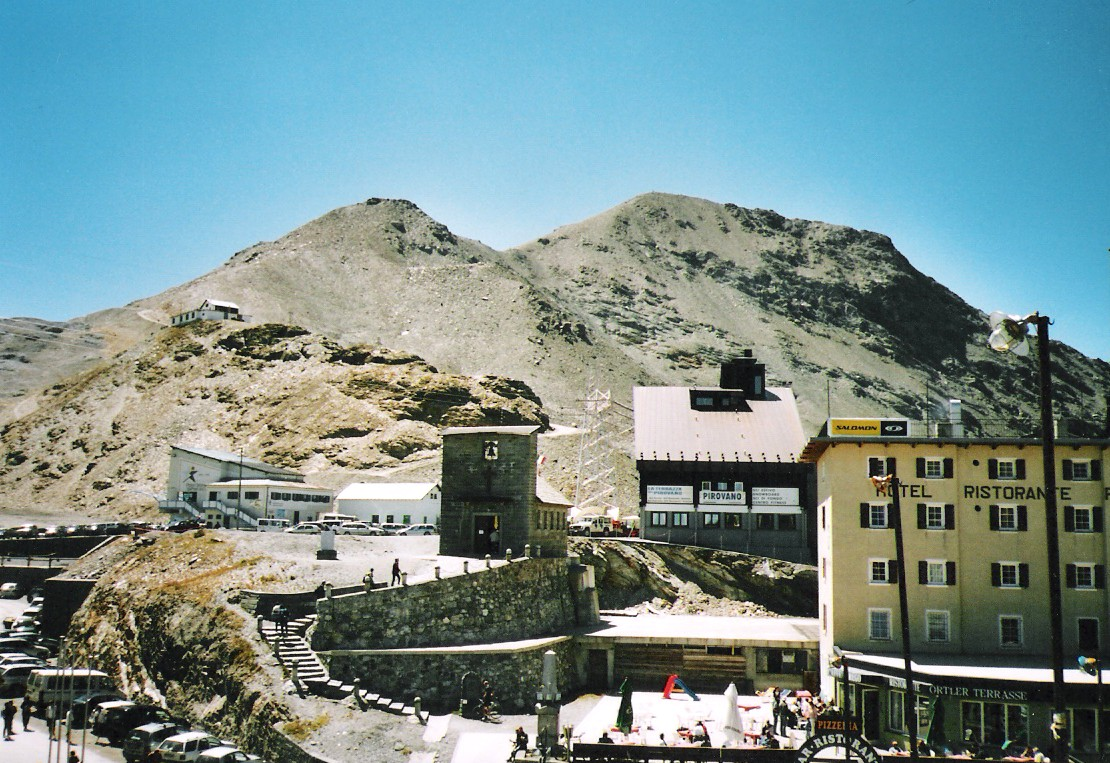
- Monte Scorluzzo from Stelvio Pass

Highest point
- Elevation: 3,094 m (10,151 ft)
- Prominence: 187 m (614 ft) ↓ Passo di Platigliole
- Parent peak: Cima del Chiodo
- Isolation: 1.75km
- Coordinates: 46°31′19″N 10°26′33″E

Geography
- Location within Alps Location within Italy
- Location: Lombardy, Italy
- Parent range: Ortler Alps

Climbing
- Easiest route: from Stelvio Pass

Monte Scorluzzo is a summit of the Ortler Alps, located in Lombardy, Italy close to the border to Trentino-Alto Adige and Grisons, Switzerland. It lies within Stelvio National Park, and is known as an "easy three-thousander" as its summit can be reached within a 1.5 hour hike from Stelvio Pass.

The mountain was occupied by Austria-Hungary during the White War, and today the remains of the military positions can still be seen.
