= Monte Altissimo =

Mountain in Italy

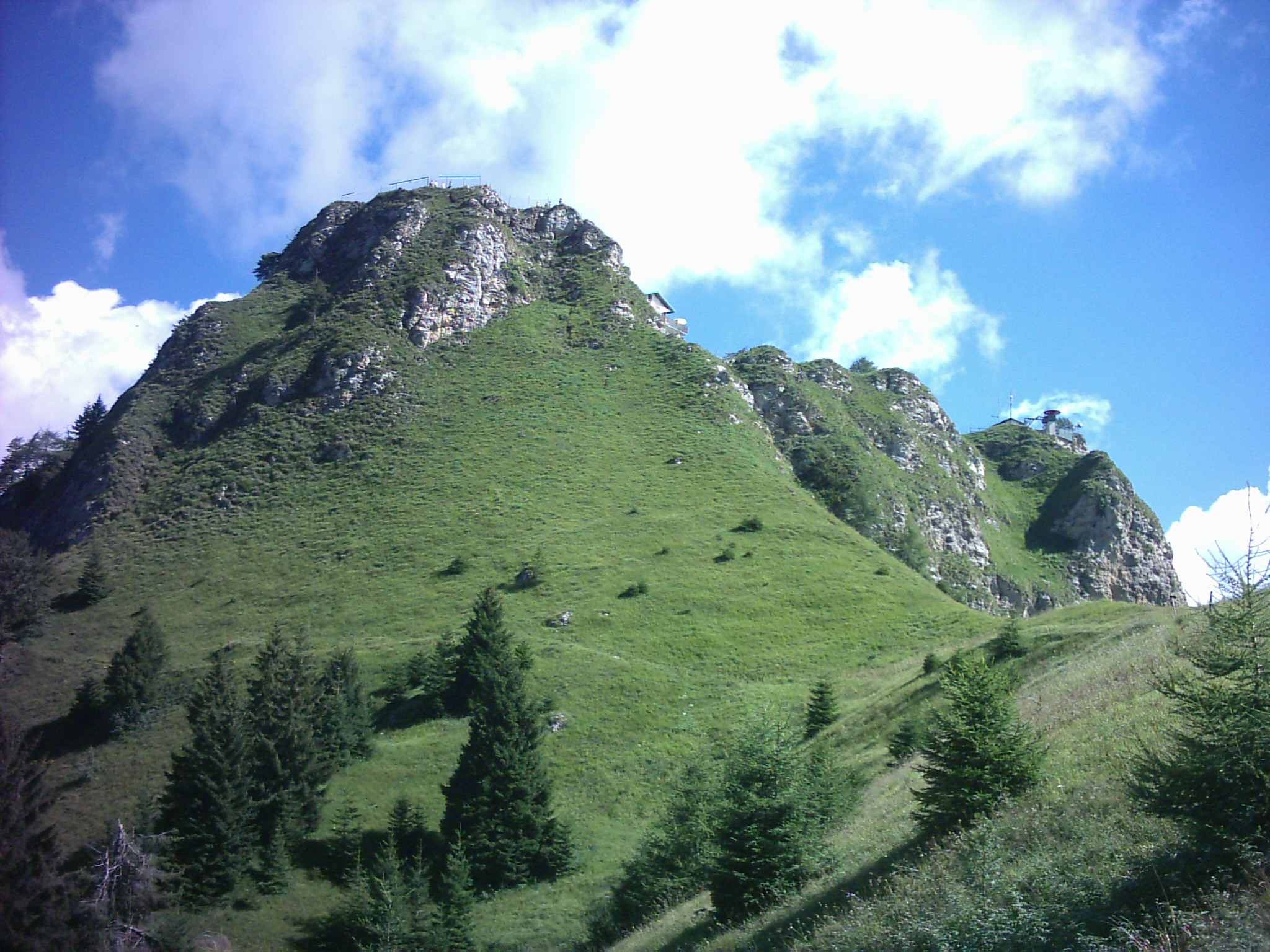
- Monte Altissimo

Highest point
- Elevation: 1,703 m (5,587 ft)
- Prominence: 606 m (1,988 ft)
- Coordinates: 45°54′41″N 10°10′25″E

Geography
- Location within Alps
- Location: Lombardy, Italy
- Parent range: Bergamasque Prealps

Monte Altissimo is a mountain in the Bergamasque Prealps, with a height of 1,703 metres (5,587 ft).

It is located between the lower Val Camonica, the lower Val di Scalve. The Borno plateau divides it from the higher Pizzo Camino. Nearby is the Oglio River.
