= Monte Tonale =

Mountain in Italy

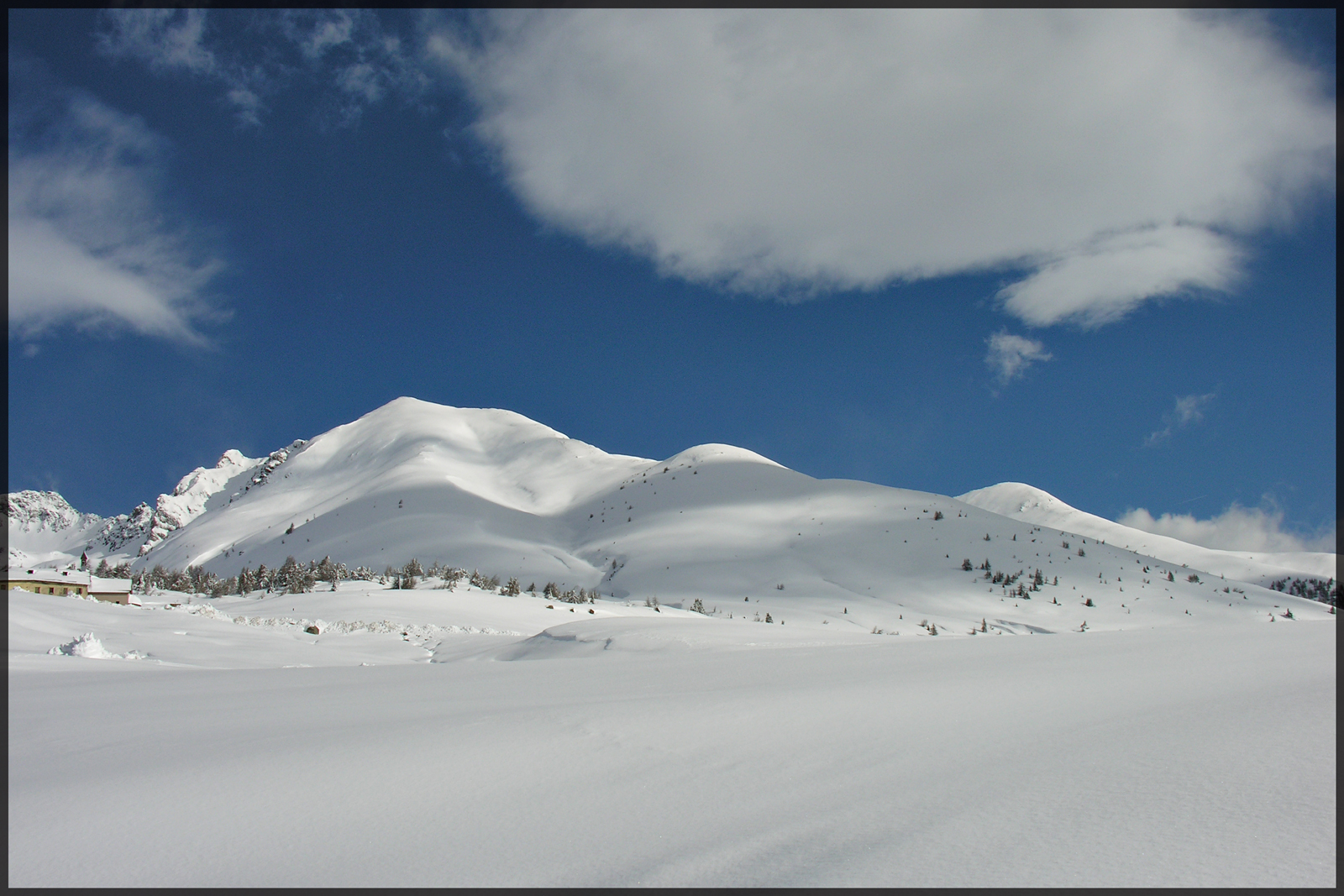
- Monte Tonale Orientale

Highest point
- Elevation: 2,696 m (8,845 ft)
- Coordinates: 46°16′59.22″N 10°33′34.74″E (Tonale occidentale, 2694 m); 46°17′06.45″N 10°35′40.47″E (Tonale orientale, 2696 m)

Geography
- Location within Alps
- Location: Lombardy, Trentino, Italy

Monte Tonale is a mountain in Lombardy, Italy. It has an elevation between 2,694 and 2,696 metres above sea level.

During World War I, the place was heavily fought for between Italians holding Western side (Lombardy) and the troops of Habsburg Empire holding the Eastern side (Trentino). A memorial for the fallen Italian soldiers was erected during the fascist period.

== See also ==
- Tonale Pass
- Rhaetian Alps
