= Dolje, Tolmin =

Dolje
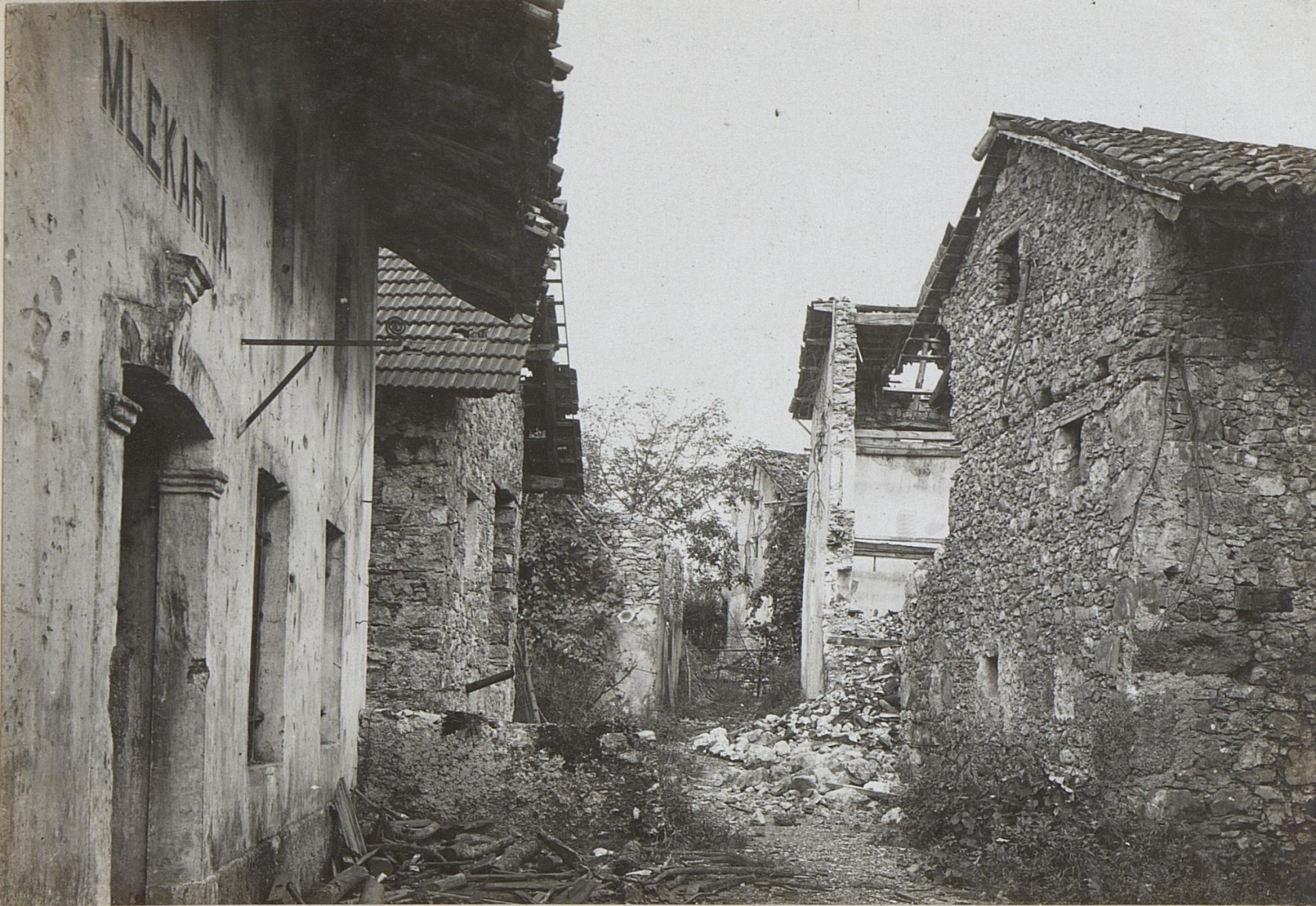

- Location in Slovenia
- Coordinates: 46°11′41.46″N 13°42′44.17″E
- Country: Slovenia
- Traditional region: Slovenian Littoral
- Statistical region: Gorizia
- Municipality: Tolmin

Area
  - Total: 3.79 km^{2} (1.46 sq mi)
- Elevation: 209 m (686 ft)

Population (2002)
  - Total: 155

Dolje (pronounced [ˈdoːljɛ]) is a settlement on the left bank of the Soča River northwest of Tolmin in the Littoral region of Slovenia.
