= Quero, Veneto =

Quero
- Comune
- Comune di Quero
- Location within Italy Location within Veneto
- Coordinates: 45°55′N 11°56′E
- Country: Italy
- Region: Veneto
- Province: Belluno (BL)
- Frazioni: Schievenin, Carpen, Santa Maria, Cilladon, Prada

Area
  - Total: 28 km^{2} (11 sq mi)
- Elevation: 288 m (945 ft)

Population (2001)
  - Total: 2,311
  - Density: 83/km^{2} (210/sq mi)
- Demonym: Queresi
- Time zone: UTC+1 (CET)
  - Summer (DST): UTC+2 (CEST)
- Postal code: 32030
- Dialing code: 0439

Quero is a town in the province of Belluno, in the Veneto region of northern Italy. It is a frazione of Quero Vas, having been a commune in its own right until 2013.

== History ==
Quero was founded perhaps by the Greeks. It became feud of the counts of Collalto, and it was territory administered by a popular assembly. St. Girolamo Emiliani was converted in this city in 1511. The parish church was a national monument, destroyed in 1917 by the Germans. It has since been completely reconstructed.

== Geography ==
The territory of Quero is extended along the right side of the lowest valley of the Piave River.

== Twin towns ==
Quero is twinned with:

- Auzat, France
- Vicdessos, France
