= List of power stations in Slovenia =

The following page lists all power stations in Slovenia.

== Nuclear ==
Name	Location	Coordinates	Type	Capacity, MWe	District heating	Operational	Manufacturer	Notes
Krško Nuclear Power Plant	Krško	45.9382023°N 15.5154258°E	PWR	696 MW	No	1981-	Westinghouse	operated together with Croatia on 50/50 basis

== Fossil fuel ==
Name	Location	Coordinates	Fuel	Capacity, MWe	District heating	Operational	Notes
Trbovlje Power Plant	Trbovlje	46.1260209°N 15.0617194°E	Trbovlje and Velenje Lignite	125 MW	No	1968-2014	360 metres tall chimney (tallest in Europe)
Šoštanj Power Plant	Šoštanj	46.3727833°N 15.0531578°E	Velenje Lignite/ fuel oil/ natural gas	1029 MW	265 MW	1956-	System online reserve, modern unit 6 is the first ultrasuperciritical unit in Slovenia, it is using local coal from Velenje coal mine
Velenje Power Plant	Velenje		Velenje Lignite	7.25 MW	25.5 MW	1928-1971	first cogeneration in Yugoslavia with district heating
Ljubljana City Power Plant	Ljubljana		Trbovlje coal	4 MW	yes	1898-1966	it had also reciprocating type steam engines
Ljubljana Power Plant	Ljubljana		Indonesian coal	124 MW	340 MW	1966-	Produces both electricity and steam/hot water for district heating in Ljubljana.
Brestanica Thermal Power Plant	Brestanica		Natural gas/fuel oil	350 MW	No	1943-	System standby reserve and backup for Krško nuclear power plant

== Hydroelectric ==
Name	River	Location	Coordinates	Type	Capacity, MWe	Operational	Manufacturer	Notes
HPP Dravograd	Drava	Dravograd		Run-of-river	26	1944-		
HPP Vuzenica	Drava	Vuzenica		Run-of-river	56	1953-		
HPP Vuhred	Drava	Vuhred		Run-of-river	72	1956-		
HPP Ožbalt	Drava	Ožbalt		Run-of-river	73	1960-		
HPP Fala	Drava	Fala, Ruše		Run-of-river	58	1918-		
HPP Mariborski otok	Drava	Maribor		Run-of-river	60	1948-		
HPP Zlatoličje	Drava	Zlatoličje		Run-of-river	114	1969-		
HPP Formin	Drava	Markovci		Run-of-river	116	1978-		
Medvode Hydroelectric Power Plant	Sava	Medvode			25	1953-		
Doblar 1 Hydroelectric Power Plant	Soča	Doblar			39	1939-		
Plave 1 Hydroelectric Power Plant	Soča	Plave			15	1940-		
Solkan Hydroelectric Power Plant	Soča	Solkan			32	1984-		
Doblar 2 Hydroelectric Power Plant	Soča	Doblar			40	2002-		
Plave 2 Hydroelectric Power Plant	Soča	Plave			20	2002-		
Avče Pumped Storage Plant	Soča	Avče		Pumped-storage	185	2009-		

== Unconventional ==
Name	Location	Coordinates	Type	Capacity, MWe	Operational	Manufacturer	Notes
Dolenja Vas Wind Power Plant	Dolenja Vas, Divača		Windmill	2.3	2013-	Enerco	

== See also ==
- List of power stations in Europe
- List of largest power stations in the world
