= Brestanica Thermal Power Plant =

- Location of the Brestanica Thermal Power Plant in Slovenia
- Country: Slovenia
- Coordinates: 45°59′51.6762″N 15°28′42.5778″E
- Status: Completed
- Owner: GEN energija Doo
- Operator: Termoelektrarna Brestanica Doo

Thermal power station
- Primary fuel: Natural gas
- Secondary fuel: Petroleum

Power generation
- Units operational: 6

The Brestanica Thermal Power Plant (Slovene: Termoelektrarna Brestanica) is a natural gas and petroleum fueled power station in Brestanica, Slovenia. The plant is owned by GEN energija and operated by Termoelektrarna Brestanica Doo.

Composed of gas turbines with fast response times to changes in demand, the plant is primarily used to provide ancillary services to the electrical grid such as frequency restoration; the plant also provides traditional electricity generation during times of high demand.

== Generating units ==
As of the early 2020s, the plant operates six simple (open) cycle gas turbines capable of operating on natural gas or fuel oil. Construction of a new gas turbine unit capable of generating 40 MWe to 70 MWe, PB 7, started in 2019. The stated plan is to retire the older Units 1 through 3 once Unit 7 is operational.

Per data reported by the International Energy Agency, following steep declines in use since 1990, Slovenia eliminated the use of oil for generating electricity in 2019.

== See also ==
- List of power stations in Slovenia
- Energy in Slovenia
