= Šoštanj Power Plant =

Power plant

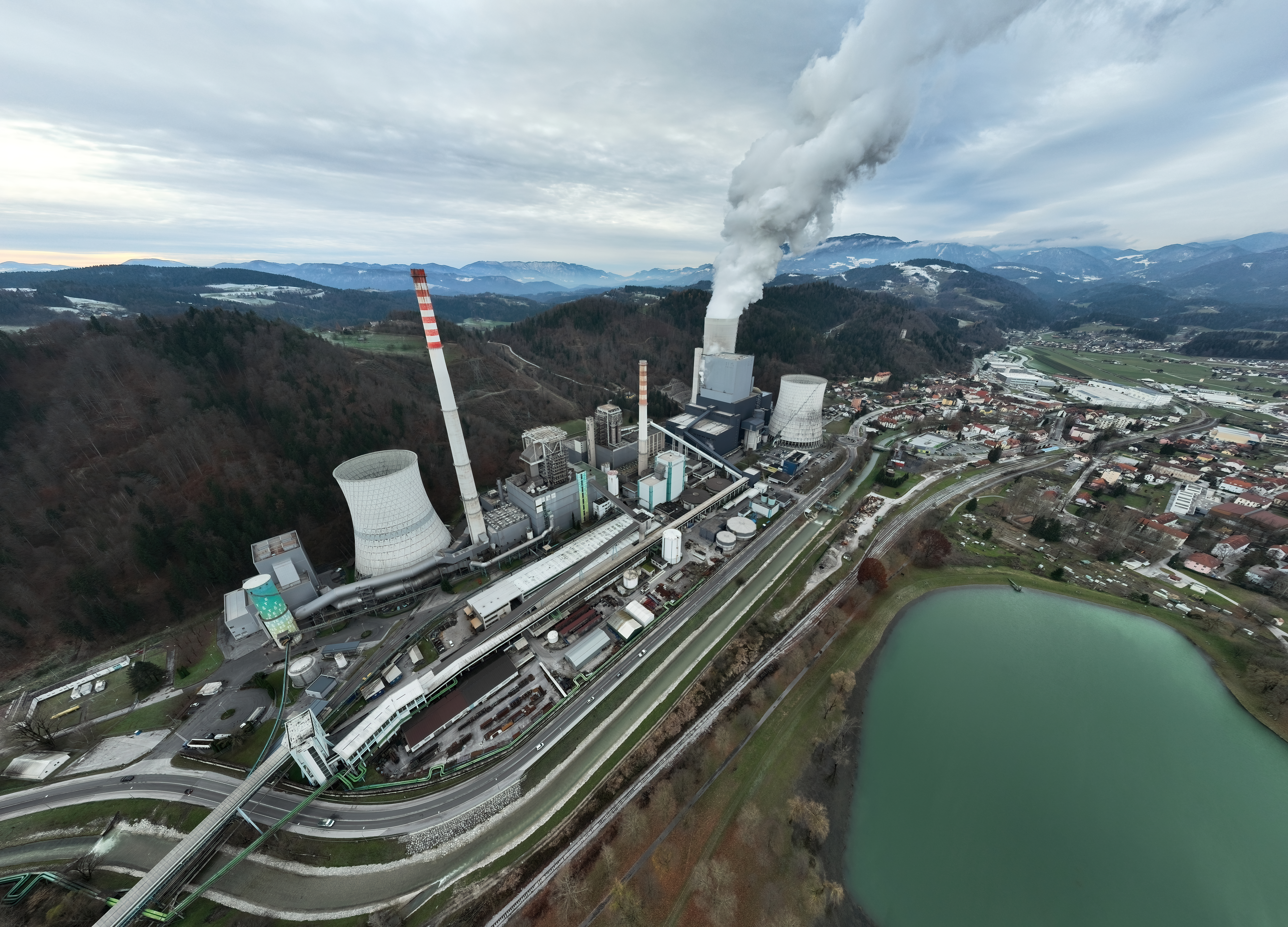
- Location of the Šoštanj Power Plant in Slovenia
- Official name: Termoelektrarna Šoštanj d.o.o.
- Country: Slovenia
- Coordinates: 46°22′22.02″N 15°3′11.37″E
- Status: Operational
- Commission date: 1956-today
- Owner: Holding Slovenske Elektrarne

Thermal power station
- Primary fuel: Lignite
- Secondary fuel: Heating oil, Natural gas

Power generation
- Units operational: 4
- Nameplate capacity: 1,029 MWe (gross)

External links
- Website: https://www.te-sostanj.si
- Commons: Related media on Commons

The Šoštanj Thermal Power Plant (Slovene: Termoelektrarna Šoštanj) is a big lignite, heating oil and natural gas fueled power station in Šoštanj, Slovenia with plate capacity of 1,029 MWe. Termoelektrarna Šoštanj (TEŠ) is fully owned by Holding Slovenske Elektrarne (HSE), which is 100% held by the Republic of Slovenia. New unit 6 is the most modern production unit of its type in the EU.

== Generating units ==
As of the early 2020s, the plant operates two lignite fueled generating units and two natural gas fueled generating units.

In addition to generation of electricity, the operating units provide district heating to the surrounding area, mainly Velenje city and Šoštanj.

=== Units 1,2,3,4 ===
Units 1,2,3,4 were built in 1956, 1956, 1960, and 1972 and were permanently retired due to age, economic unprofitability, and ecology. Their installation capacity was 30MW, 30MW, 75MW, and 275MW, together capable of producing 410 MWe.

=== Unit 5 ===
TES Unit 5 is a lignite-fueled thermal unit. It was strongly retrofitted with new technology to meet the new EU environmental requirements. The boiler was constructed by Sulzer, the steam turbines by KWU - Kraftwerk Union and the electric generator by Siemens. Flue gas cleaning devices are: electrofiltration Dust <20 mg/Nm3, wet washing flue gases DeSO_{x} SO_{x} <200 mg/Nm3, SNCR with Urea NO_{x} <200 mg/Nm3. The unit is capable of producing 345 MWe.

=== Unit 6 ===
TES Unit 6 is a supercritical lignite-fueled thermal unit and the most modern production unit of its type in the EU. The boiler was constructed by Benson with NO_{x}-optimized burners, the steam turbines and electric generator by Alstom. Flue gas cleaning devices are best available technology: electrofiltration Dust <10 mg/Nm3, wet washing flue gases DeSO_{x} SO_{x} <100 mg/Nm3 and SCR-DeNOX with Urea NO_{x} <200 mg/Nm3. In the case of the commercial availability of CO_{2} capture technology, the unit has a planned place for the installation of such a device. The unit is capable of producing 600 MWe.

=== Unit PE51 ===
TES PE51 is a Siemens SGT 800 gas turbine capable of producing 42 MWe.

=== Unit PE52 ===
TES PE52 is a Siemens SGT 800 gas turbine capable of producing 42 MWe.

== Unit 6 controversy ==
In 2008, Slovenian energy company Holding Slovenske Elektrarne (HSE) and subsidiary operating company Termoelektrarna Šoštanj (TEŠ) signed a deal with French multinational company Alstom to construct a new lignite fueled generating unit to be known as TES 6. The new unit was intended to replace older, less efficient generating units at the plant.

The plans were subject to protests from environmental groups and criticized by non-governmental organizations which monitor the actions of the European Bank for Reconstruction and Development and the European Investment Bank, two major funders of the project. Critics alleged widespread corruption in the planning, award, and construction of TES 6.

Following years of delays, the new unit achieved operation in late 2014 at a cost of 1.4 billion euros.

Slovenian prosecutors filed charges of corruption and money laundering against two individuals and Alstom in 2020 in connection with TES 6.

In March 2021, General Electric (GE), which had purchased Alstom's energy unit in 2015, agreed to pay HES 261 million euros to settle claims brought by HES against GE.

== Lignite supply ==
The solid fuel units at the plant are supplied by the nearby Velenje Coal Mine. The mine is the only active lignite mine in Slovenia, near Velenje in the north central region of the country. The mine produced 3.2 million tonnes of lignite in 2018 for combustion in the plant.

== See also ==
- List of power stations in Slovenia
- Energy in Slovenia
