= Energy in Slovenia =

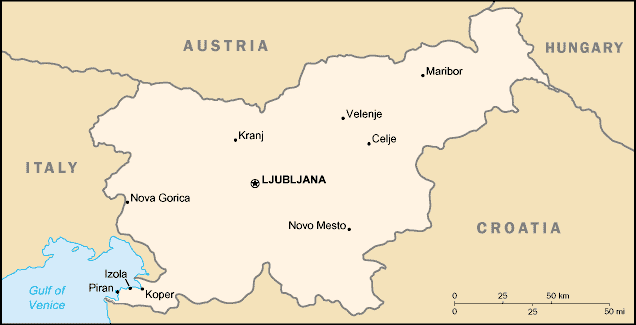
Location

Total primary energy supply (TPES) in Slovenia was 6.80 Mtoe in 2019. In the same year, electricity production was 16.1 TWh, consumption was 14.9 TWh.

== Statistics ==
2020 energy statistics

Production capacities for electricity (billion kWh)
| Type | Amount |
|---|---|
| Nuclear | 13.09 |
| Hydro | 11.39 |
| Fossil fuel | 9.68 |
| Wind power | 1.90 |
| Solar | 0.78 |
| Biomass | 0.60 |
| Total | 37.44 |

Electricity (billion kWh)
| Category | Amount |
|---|---|
| Consumption | 13.45 |
| Production | 16.30 |
| Import | 7.12 |
| Export | 9.12 |

Natural Gas (billion m^{3})
| Consumption | 0.90 |
| Import | 0.90 |

CO_{2} emissions:
12.48 million tons

== General ==
The transportation and industrial sectors were the largest consumers of energy in Slovenia in 2019.

Slovenia is a net energy importer, importing all its petroleum products (mainly for the transport sector) and natural gas, as well as some coal.

== Energy plan ==
Slovenia has a target of reducing greenhouse gasses by 18% in 2030 when compared to 2015.

== Fuel sources ==
=== Fossil fuels ===
==== Coal and lignite ====
Lignite deposits are found in the north central and northeastern regions of Slovenia; the country does not have any identified hard coal reserves. There is one active lignite mine in Slovenia, near Velenje in the north central region of the country. The mine produced 3.2 million tonnes of lignite in 2018 for combustion in the neighboring Šoštanj Power Plant. The mine is Slovenia's only producing fossil fuel facility. The power plant has an expected closure date of 2033. Nonetheless, the government hopes to close the plant between 2024 and 2029.

Some coal is imported for district heating and electrical power generation use at the Ljubljana Power Station.

==== Petroleum and natural gas ====
Slovenia has essentially no natural gas or petroleum reserves or production.

The possibility of a gas pipeline with Hungary has been proposed for years, a pipeline exists to the border with Hungary, but as of 2023 it has not been connected to Hungary.

Slovenia has a gas interconnector project with Croatia and will be increasing the capacity by 5 bcm/y by 2027.

=== Renewable energy ===
Years in which the last three renewable power levels achieved
| Achievement | Year |
|---|---|
| 10% | <1990 |
| 15% | 2000 |
| 20% | 2013 |

Renewable energy includes wind, solar, biomass and geothermal energy sources.

==== Solar energy ====
Per analysis published by the World Bank which considers natural features of a location such as altitude, humidity, cloud cover, and topography, Slovenia's solar PV potential is relatively low compared to global resources, but is comparable to that of other central and eastern European countries which lie north of the Alps. The sunny coastal strip along the Adriatic Sea has better potential than the inland areas, similar to that of northern Italy and southern France.

A solar power plant with a capacity of 6MW opened in 2023 at Brežice, linked to the hydro power plant.

==== Wind energy ====
Slovenia had just 2 wind turbines in 2022.

Onshore wind energy potential for Slovenia is typical of central and eastern Europe. A northwest to southeast band of higher potential wind energy is found across far southwest Slovenia, roughly between Gorizia, Italy and Rijeka, Croatia. Unlike the Atlantic Ocean and North Sea offshore areas of western and northern Europe, the offshore wind resources for Slovenia in the Adriatic Sea are not that much greater than onshore.

There is a plan for a wind power plant at Dolenja Vas of up to 66 MW.

==== Biomass ====
Biomass provides very little electricity capacity

=== Hydroelectricity ===
With abundant precipitation and numerous mountains, including the Julian Alps across the north of the country, Slovenia has significant hydropower natural resources.

=== Nuclear ===
The single 696 MW nuclear reactor at the Krško Nuclear Power Plant near Krško in the eastern part of the country has been operational since October 1981. The plant generated 5.7 TWh of electricity being 36.2% of the electricity produced in Slovenia in 2021. Designed by United States company Westinghouse, the two loop, light water, pressurized water reactor was constructed and is operated as a 50% / 50% joint venture between Slovenia and neighboring Croatia.

Slovenia electric company GEN Energija is seeking to construct a second nuclear reactor at the site to support national climate, electrification, and energy security goals.

== Electricity ==
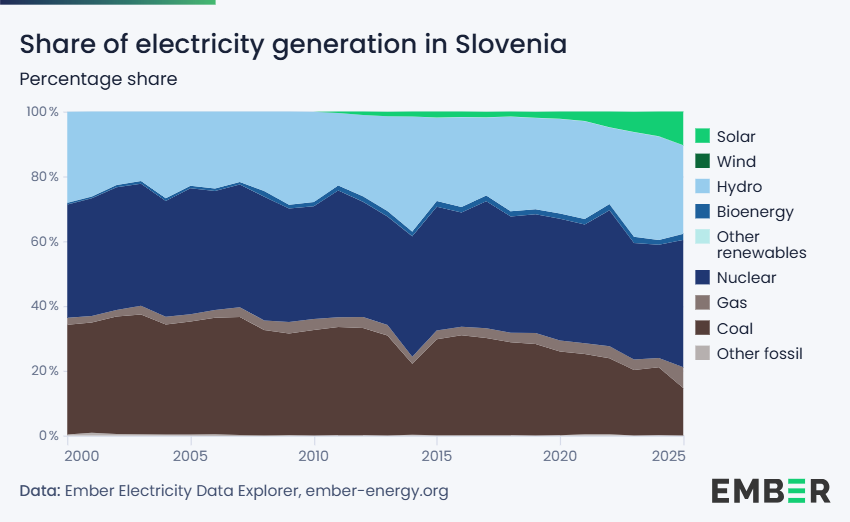
Share of electricity generation in Slovenia - percentage share

Electricity generation is mainly provided by nuclear power (36.2% in 2019), hydroelectricity (29.1% in 2019), and coal (27.9% in 2019); the three sources accounting for 93.2% of total electricity generation. Minor sources of electricity generation, each contributing less than 4% of total electricity generation, are natural gas, solar photovoltaic (solar PV), and biofuels. Following steep declines in use since 1990, Slovenia eliminated the use of oil for generating electricity in 2019. Renewable energy sources other than hydropower (e.g., biofuels, solar PV, waste, and wind) together provided 3.5% of total electricity generation in 2019.

== Climate change ==
Slovenia, both as an independent party and a member of the European Union, signed the Paris Agreement in 2016. The European Union Nationally Determined Contribution (NDC) towards climate goals includes Slovenia. In the December 2020 update to the European Union NDC, Slovenia committed to the common goals and to reduce its emissions from outside of the European Union Emissions Trading Scheme by 15% from 2005 levels by 2030. For comparison, the four adjoining countries pledged the following reductions in the same document:

- Austria 36%
- Croatia 7%
- Hungary 7%
- Italy 33%

As a member of the European Union, Slovenia was required to prepare and submit a national energy and climate plan (NECP). Slovenia submitted their Integrated National Energy and Climate Plan of the Republic of Slovenia in February 2020. The country is seeking to move away from fossil fuels through electrification of areas of the economy such as transportation and heating with generation resources which emit little or no greenhouse gasses such as nuclear power and renewables.

Slovenia generated 68.8% of its electricity with zero carbon or carbon neutral sources in 2019, dominated by nuclear power and hydroelectricity. Fossil fuels oil, coal, and natural gas contributed 61% of the total energy supply of Slovenia in 2019.

== See also ==
- Nuclear power in Slovenia
- Renewable energy by country
- List of power stations in Slovenia
