= Medvode Hydroelectric Power Plant =

Run-of-the-river hydroelectricity in Slovenia

Coordinates: 46.145735°N 14.414341°E

The Medvode Hydroelectric Power Plant (also Medvode HPP, Slovene: Hidroelektrarna Medvode) is a run-of-the-river hydroelectricity in Slovenia. The ROR is located on the Sava River in Medvode.

The hydroelectric plant was built in part using forced labor by Catholic priests held as political prisoners after the Second World War. The Medvode Hydroelectric Power Plant is operated by Ljubljana Sava Hydroelectric Plants (Slovene: Savske elektrarne Ljubljana, SEL).

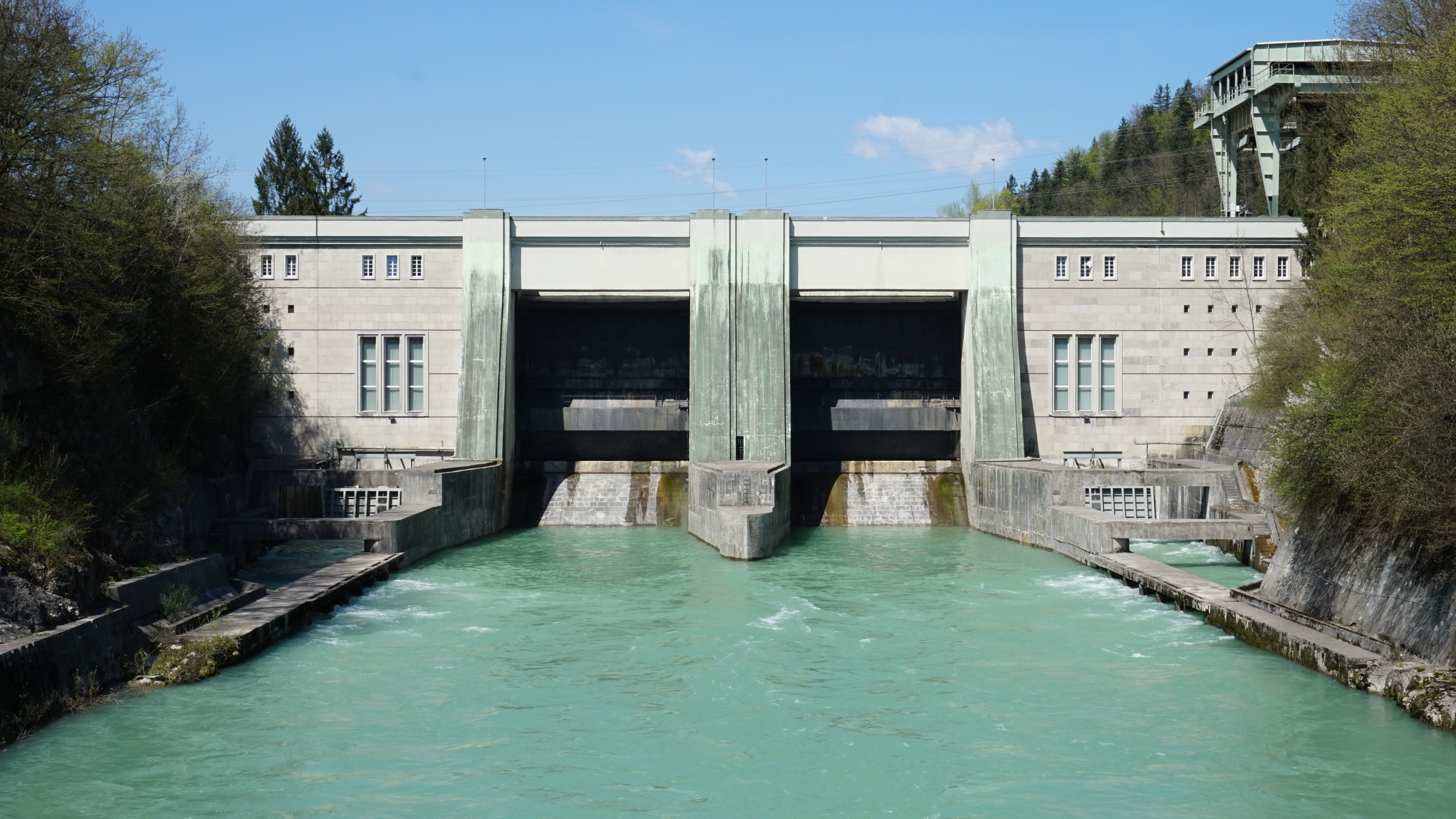
Medvode Hydroelectric Power Plant in 2018

== See also ==
- List of power stations in Slovenia
