= Ljubljana Power Station =

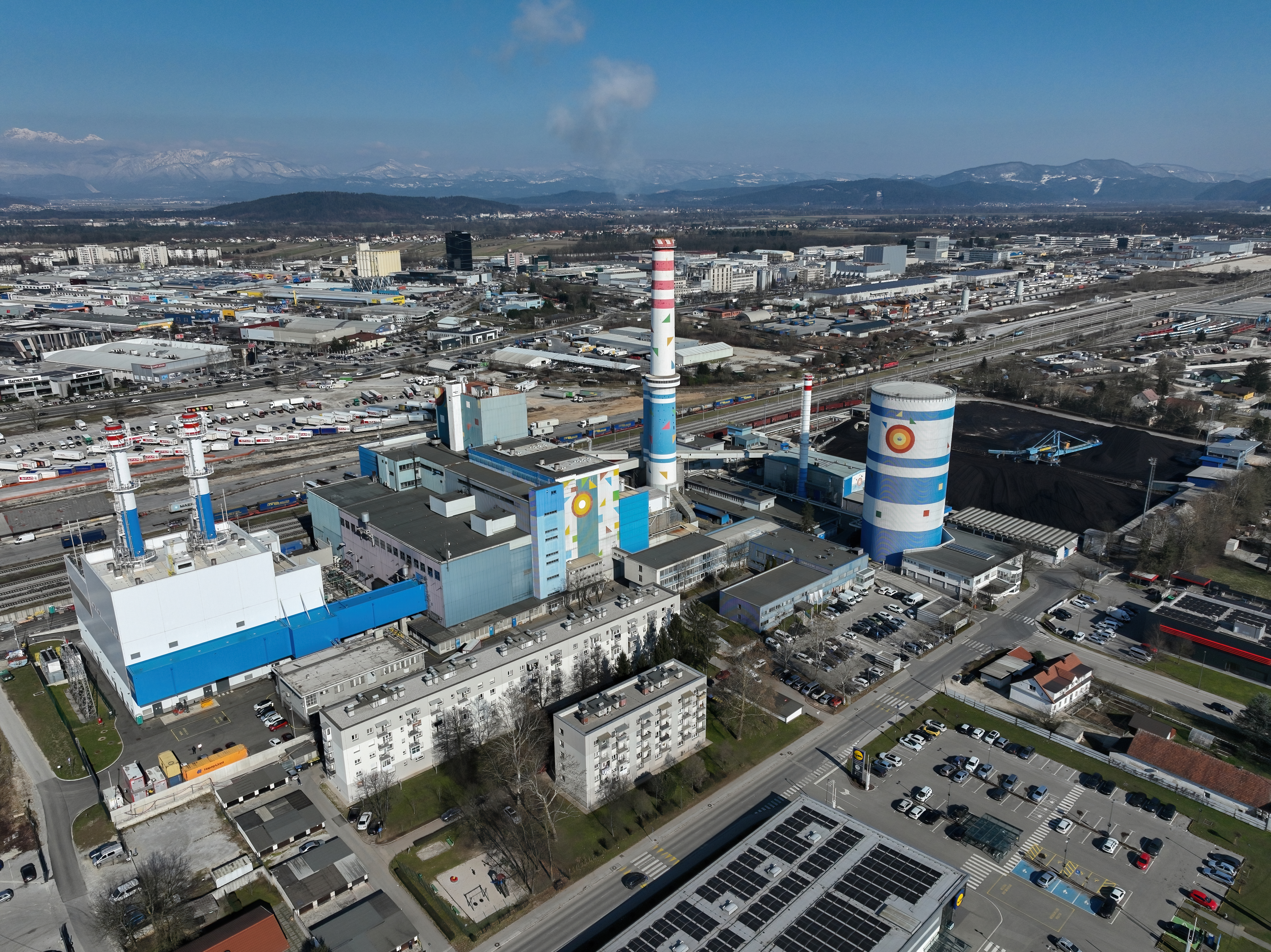
Ljubljana Power Station (2025)

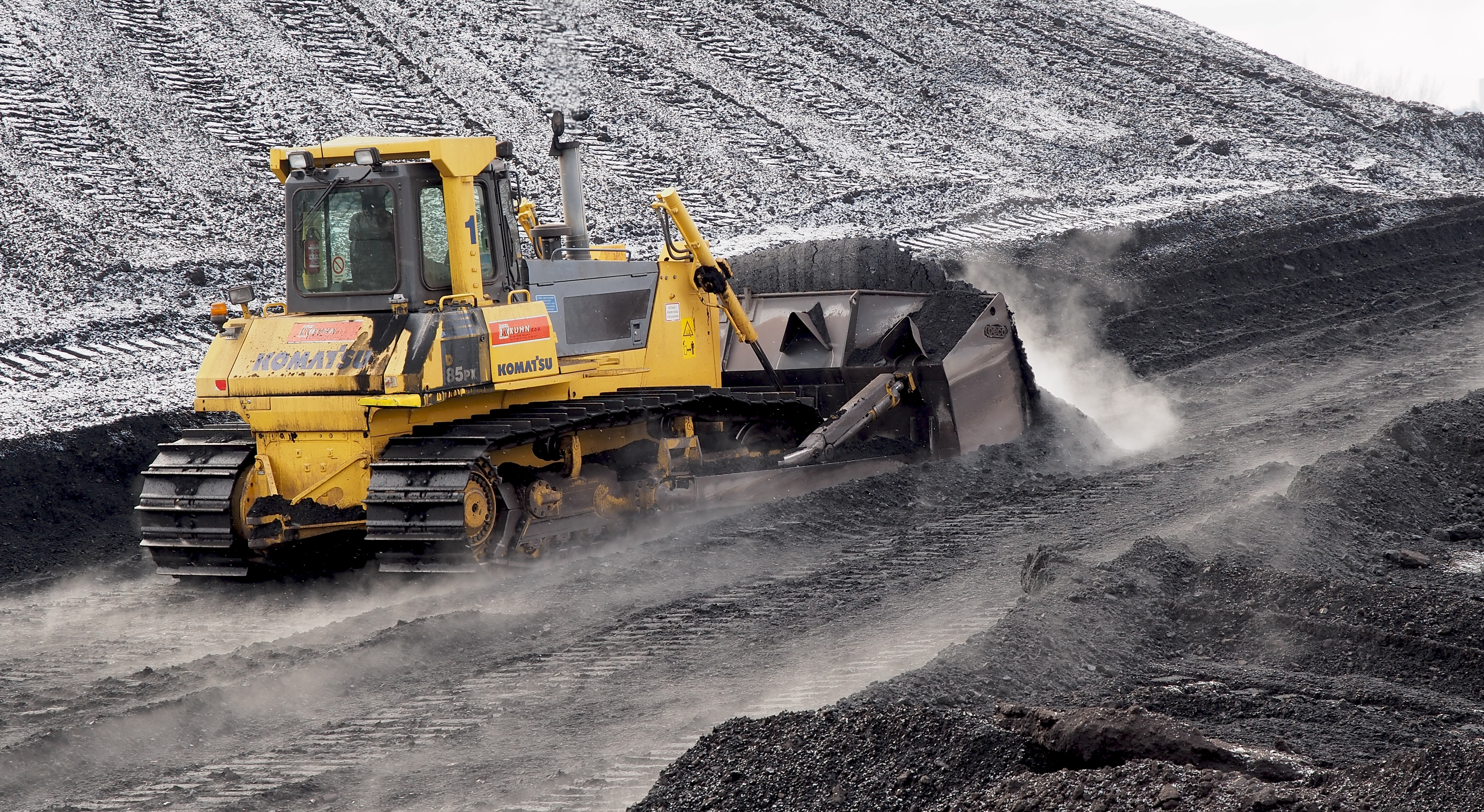
Komatsu bulldozer pushing coal at the Ljubljana Power Station (2017)

Ljubljana power station from drone

The Ljubljana Power Station is a coal-fired heat and power station in the Moste District of Ljubljana, the capital of Slovenia.

== Owner-Operator ==
The plant is owned and operated by Energetika Ljubljana.

== Production of heat and electricity ==
The plant delivers 90% of the remote generated heat in Ljubljana. About 74% of Ljubljana households use district heating.

== Operating units ==
The power station consists of three units, which went in service in 1966, 1967, and 1984, and generate 42 MW, 32 MW, and 50 MW of electric power (94 MW, 94 MW, and 152 MW of heat, respectively). The 101-metre-tall (331 ft) chimney at 46°3′28.9″N 14°32′40.9″E has a gallery that resembles an observation deck. However, it contains equipment for exhaust monitoring.

== Fuel ==
The Ljubljana Power Station uses coal procured from Indonesia and 15% biomass, about 100,000 tons of woodchips per year. In the past, coal was supplied from Slovenian Central Sava Valley coal mines; however, Indonesian coal is cheaper and contains less sulfur.

== See also ==
- Energy in Slovenia
- List of power stations in Slovenia
