= List of longest running hydroelectric power plants =

This is a list of oldest hydroelectric power plants that are in operation.

== Constructed in the 19th century ==
- Steigbachwerk, Immenstadt, Germany, 175 m. start 1880, 270 kW. 146 years old.
- Ames Hydroelectric Generating Plant, Colorado, USA, constructed in 1890, 136 years old.
- Nagold Hydroelectric Plant, Germany, since 1893, 133 133 years old
- Mechanicville Hydroelectric Plant, USA, constructed in 1897, 129 years old.
- Mambach Hydroelectric Plant, Germany, constructed in 1897, 129 years old.

== Constructed in the 20th century ==
- Appleton Powerhouse, USA, 2.2MW, constructed in 1901, 125 years old.
- Landara Hydroelectric Plant, Bolivia, opened 1902, 124 years old.
- Quintana Hydroelectric Plant, Spain, operational since 1902, 124 years old. 18.45 metres, rated output of 7.8 MW, producing an annual average of 23 GWh
- Necaxa Hydroelectric Plant, Mexico, opened in 1905, 121 years old. Both the plant and parts of the original transmission line are still in service.
- Lockport Powerhouse, Illinois, USA, 1907. Now generating 13.4 MW on the Chicago Ship and Sanitary Canal.
- Keokuk Energy Center (Lock and Dam No. 19), Iowa, USA, 142MW, constructed in 1910. 116 years old.
- La Calera Hydroelectric Plant, Cordoba, Argentina, constructed in 1911. 115 years old.
- Pharping Hydropower Station, Nepal, 500kW, constructed in 1911, 115 years old.
- Coyas Hydroelectric Plant, Chile, since 1911, 115 years old
- Pilchowice Hydroelectric Plant, Poland, operational 1912, 114 years old.
- Shilongba Hydropower Station, China, operational 1912, 114 years old.
- Laufenburg Hydroelectric Plant, Germany/Switzerland, operational 1914, 112 years old.
- Big Quinnesec Falls, USA, 4.4 MW, constructed in 1914, 112 years old.
- Brule Power Station, Wisconsin, USA, 5.3 MW, constructed in 1919, 107 years old.
- Fala Hydro Power Plant, Slovenia, constructed in 1918, 108 years old.

== Defunct stations ==
- Rheinfelden Hydroelectric Plant, Germany/Switzerland, opened 1898, closed and demolished in 2010, serving 112 years.
