= Ames, Colorado =

Ghost town in San Miguel County, Colorado, United States

- Ghost town
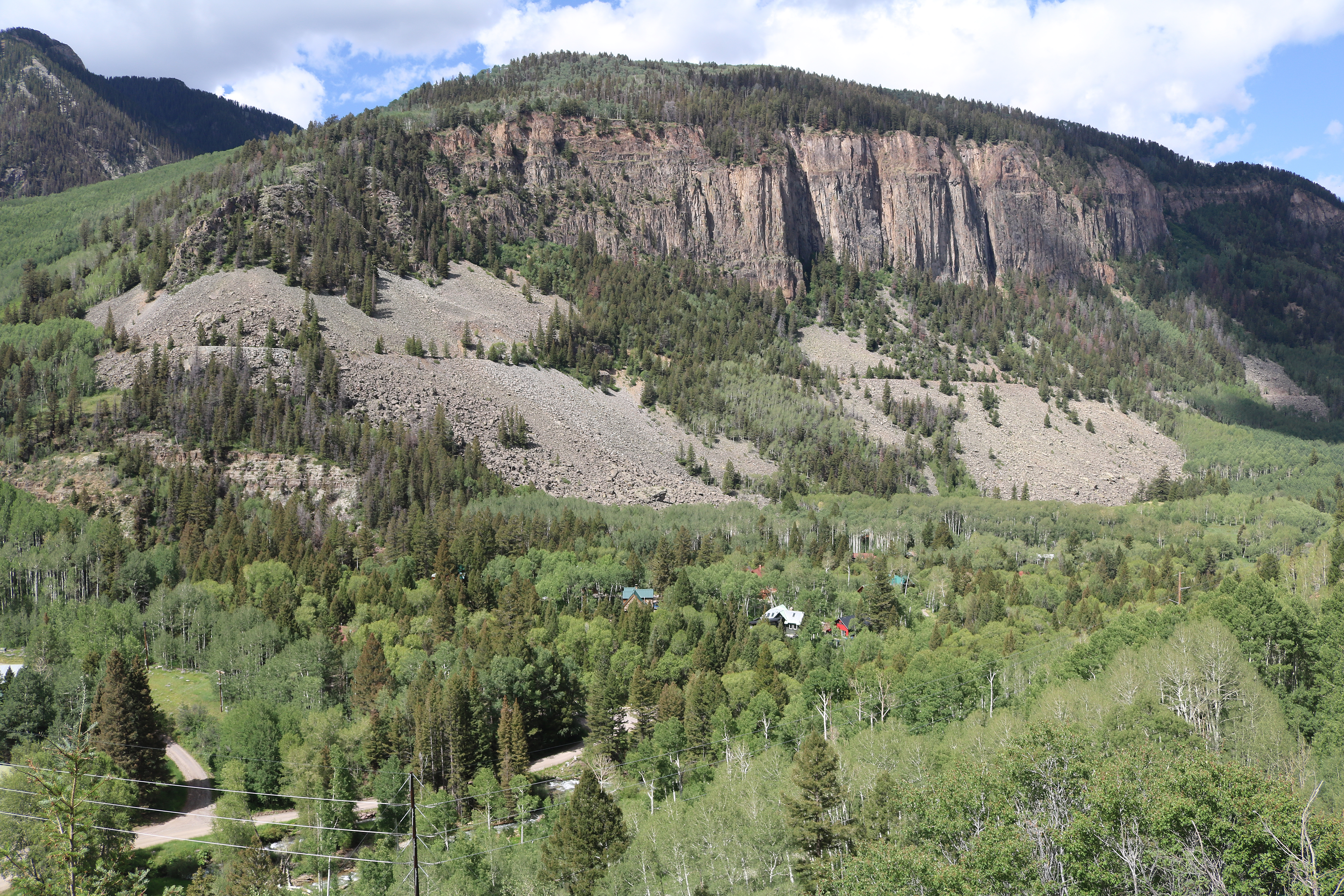
- Ames and the Ilium Valley

- Location of Ames, Colorado. Ames (Colorado)
- Coordinates: 37.8647°N 107.8823°W
- Country: United States
- State: Colorado
- County: San Miguel

Government
  - Body: San Miguel County
- Elevation: 8,721 ft (2,658 m)
- Time zone: UTC−07:00 (MST)
  - Summer (DST): UTC−06:00 (MDT)
- Area code: 970
- GNIS pop ID: 184567

Ames is a ghost town in San Miguel County, Colorado, United States.

== History ==
Ames is the site of one of the world's first hydroelectric power plants to generate and transmit alternating current electricity for industrial purposes (mining), the Ames Hydroelectric Generating Plant. The Ames, Colorado, post office operated from December 20, 1880, until June 3, 1922.

== See also ==
- Ames Hydroelectric Generating Plant
- List of populated places in Colorado
- List of post offices in Colorado
