= Ophir, Colorado =

Town in San Migel County, Colorado, United States

- Home rule town
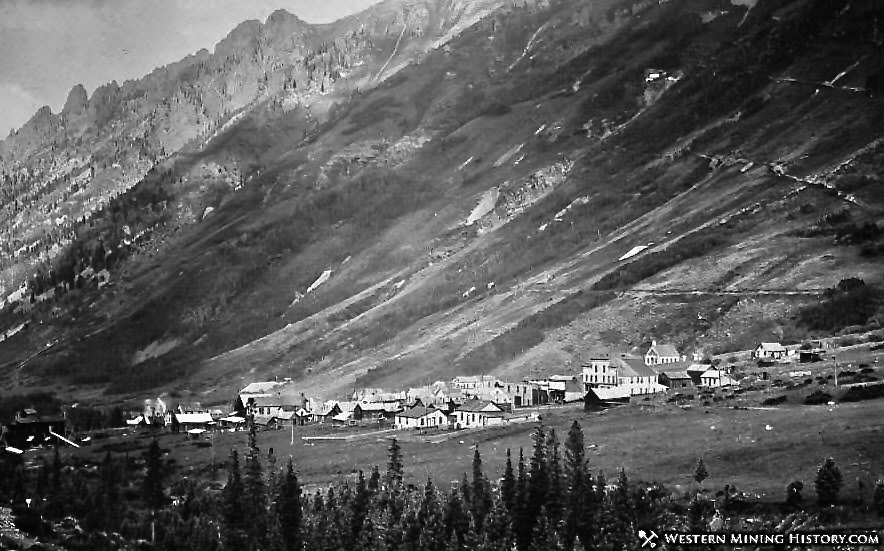
- Ophir, Colorado, around 1900

- Location of Ophir in San Miguel County, Colorado.
- Coordinates: 37°51′25″N 107°49′52″W
- Country: United States
- State: Colorado
- County: San Miguel

Government
  - Type: Home rule municipality

Area
  - Total: 0.24 sq mi (0.61 km^{2})
  - Land: 0.24 sq mi (0.61 km^{2})
  - Water: 0 sq mi (0.00 km^{2})
- Elevation: 9,725 ft (2,964 m)

Population (2020)
  - Total: 197
  - Density: 840/sq mi (320/km^{2})
- Time zone: UTC-7 (Mountain (MST))
  - Summer (DST): UTC-6 (MDT)
- ZIP code: 81426 (PO Box)
- Area code: 970
- FIPS code: 08-55870
- GNIS feature ID: 2413085
- Website: Official website

Ophir is a home rule municipality town governed by a general assembly and is located in San Miguel County, Colorado, United States. It is located two miles from the Ames Hydroelectric Generating Plant, the world's first hydroelectric plant to supply alternating current electricity for an industrial purpose (mining). The population was 197 at the 2020 census.

== History ==
A post office called Ophir was established in 1878. The town was named after Ophir, a place mentioned in the Hebrew Bible.

== Geography ==
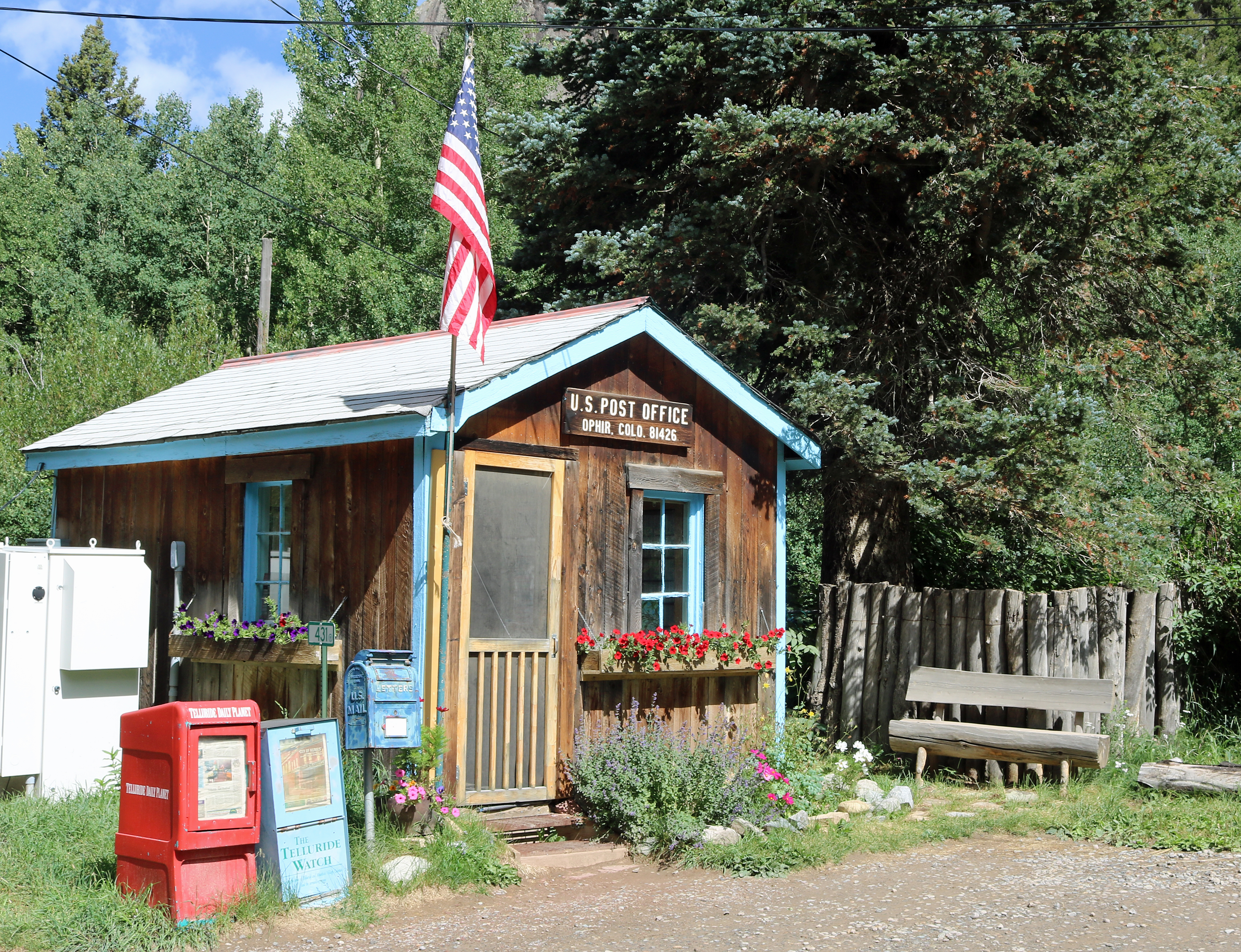
Ophir Post Office, 2019

According to the United States Census Bureau, the town has a total area of 0.2 square miles (0.52 km^{2}), all land.

== Demographics ==
Historical population
Census	Pop.	Note	%±
1880	130		—
1890	113		−13.1%
1900	127		12.4%
1910	124		−2.4%
1940	2		—
1950	2		0.0%
1970	6		—
1980	38		533.3%
1990	69		81.6%
2000	113		63.8%
2010	159		40.7%
2020	197		23.9%

== Climate ==
Climate type is dominated by the winter season, a long, bitterly cold period with short, clear days, relatively little precipitation mostly in the form of snow, and low humidity. The Köppen Climate Classification sub-type for this climate is "Dfc" (Continental Subarctic Climate).

Climate data for Ophir, Colorado
Month	Jan	Feb	Mar	Apr	May	Jun	Jul	Aug	Sep	Oct	Nov	Dec	Year
Record high °F (°C)	64 (18)	60 (16)	68 (20)	71 (22)	82 (28)	96 (36)	93 (34)	92 (33)	88 (31)	78 (26)	68 (20)	65 (18)	96 (36)
Mean daily maximum °F (°C)	34 (1)	37 (3)	41 (5)	47 (8)	57 (14)	68 (20)	73 (23)	71 (22)	64 (18)	54 (12)	42 (6)	33 (1)	51.8 (11.0)
Mean daily minimum °F (°C)	−4 (−20)	0 (−18)	8 (−13)	18 (−8)	28 (−2)	33 (1)	39 (4)	39 (4)	31 (−1)	22 (−6)	9 (−13)	−2 (−19)	18.4 (−7.6)
Record low °F (°C)	−38 (−39)	−38 (−39)	−25 (−32)	−18 (−28)	0 (−18)	10 (−12)	20 (−7)	0 (−18)	5 (−15)	−12 (−24)	−23 (−31)	−35 (−37)	−38 (−39)
Average rainfall inches (mm)	1.77 (45)	2.24 (57)	2.38 (60)	1.92 (49)	1.73 (44)	1.20 (30)	2.59 (66)	3.28 (83)	3.23 (82)	2.37 (60)	1.82 (46)	2.04 (52)	26.57 (674)
Source: Weather.com

== Points of interest ==
- Ames Hydroelectric Generating Plant
- San Juan Skyway National Scenic Byway
- Trout Lake

== Education ==
It is in the Telluride School District.

== See also ==
- List of municipalities in Colorado
- San Juan Mountains
