= Vrbina =

- Location in Slovenia
- Coordinates: 45°56′37.99″N 15°30′26.14″E
- Country: Slovenia
- Traditional region: Lower Carniola
- Statistical region: Lower Sava
- Municipality: Krško

Area
  - Total: 1.93 km^{2} (0.75 sq mi)
- Elevation: 155.8 m (511 ft)

Population (2026)
  - Total: 14
- Postal code: 8270

Vrbina (pronounced [ʋəɾˈbiːna]) is a settlement on the right bank of the Sava River in the Municipality of Krško in eastern Slovenia. The Krško Nuclear Power Plant is built on the southern side of the settlement. The area is part of the traditional region of Lower Carniola. It is now included with the rest of the municipality in the Lower Sava Statistical Region.
