= Pharping Hydropower Station =

Pharping Hydro Power Project
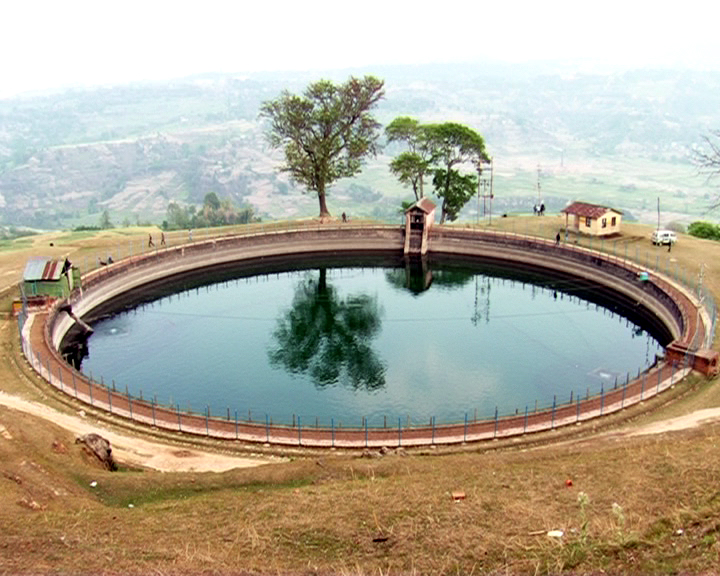

- Location in Nepal
- Country: Nepal
- Location: Pharping, kathmandu District
- Coordinates: 27°36′0″N 85°16′0″E
- Purpose: Power
- Status: Operational
- Construction began: 1907; 119 years ago
- Opening date: 1911; 115 years ago
- Construction cost: ₨713,273.82
- Owners: Nepal Electricity Authority, Government of Nepal

Dam and spillways
- Type of dam: Run-of-the-river hydroelectricity

Reservoir
- Creates: Chandrajyoti Hydro-electric power station
- Catchment area: 528733 cu. ft
- Maximum water depth: 18 feet

Power Station
- Commission date: 1911
- Type: Pumped-storage hydroelectricity
- Hydraulic head: 288 lbs/sq Inch
- Turbines: 2 × 250 KW
- Installed capacity: 500 KW

Pharping Hydro Power Project (Nepali: फर्पिङ लघु जलविद्युत् परियोजना) is the first hydro-power project of Nepal and second of South Asia. It is situated in Kathmandu district. In 2010, it was declared a Living Museum by government of Nepal and was open for public.

== History ==
Pharping Hydro Power was established in 1911 as Chandrajyoti Hydro-electric power station by Prime Minister Chandra Shamsher Jang Bahadur Rana. The plant was inaugurated by King Prithvi Bir Bikram Shah Dev on 22 May 1911 at around 6:30 pm by turning the lights on during a program in Tudhikhel, Kathmandu.

== Reservoir ==
Currently water from the reservoir lake is used for drinking water supply for Lalitpur District. Water is supplied to places like Bhaisepati, Sainbu, Kupondole, etc.

== Nepal Electricity Authority ==
Nepal Electricity Authority took over Chandrajyoti Hydro-electric Power Station and renamed it Pharping Hydro Power Station and had since been smoothly running the power station till the late 1990s when it was considered that the aging power station needed to be converted into a heritage site. In 2010, it was declared a Living Museum by government of Nepal and was open for public.

== See also ==
- List of longest running hydroelectric power plants
- List of power stations in Nepal
