= Fala Hydro Power Plant =

Run-of-the-river hydroelectricity in Slovenia

Coordinates: 46.55833°N 15.45767°E

The Fala Hydro Power Plant (also Fala Hydroelectric Power Plant or Fala HPP; Slovene: Hidroelektrarna Fala) is a Run-of-the-river hydroelectricity in Slovenia. The ROR is located in the Drava river in Selnica ob Dravi.

The Hidroelektrarna Fala started in 1918 and is the oldest ROR in the Drava river.

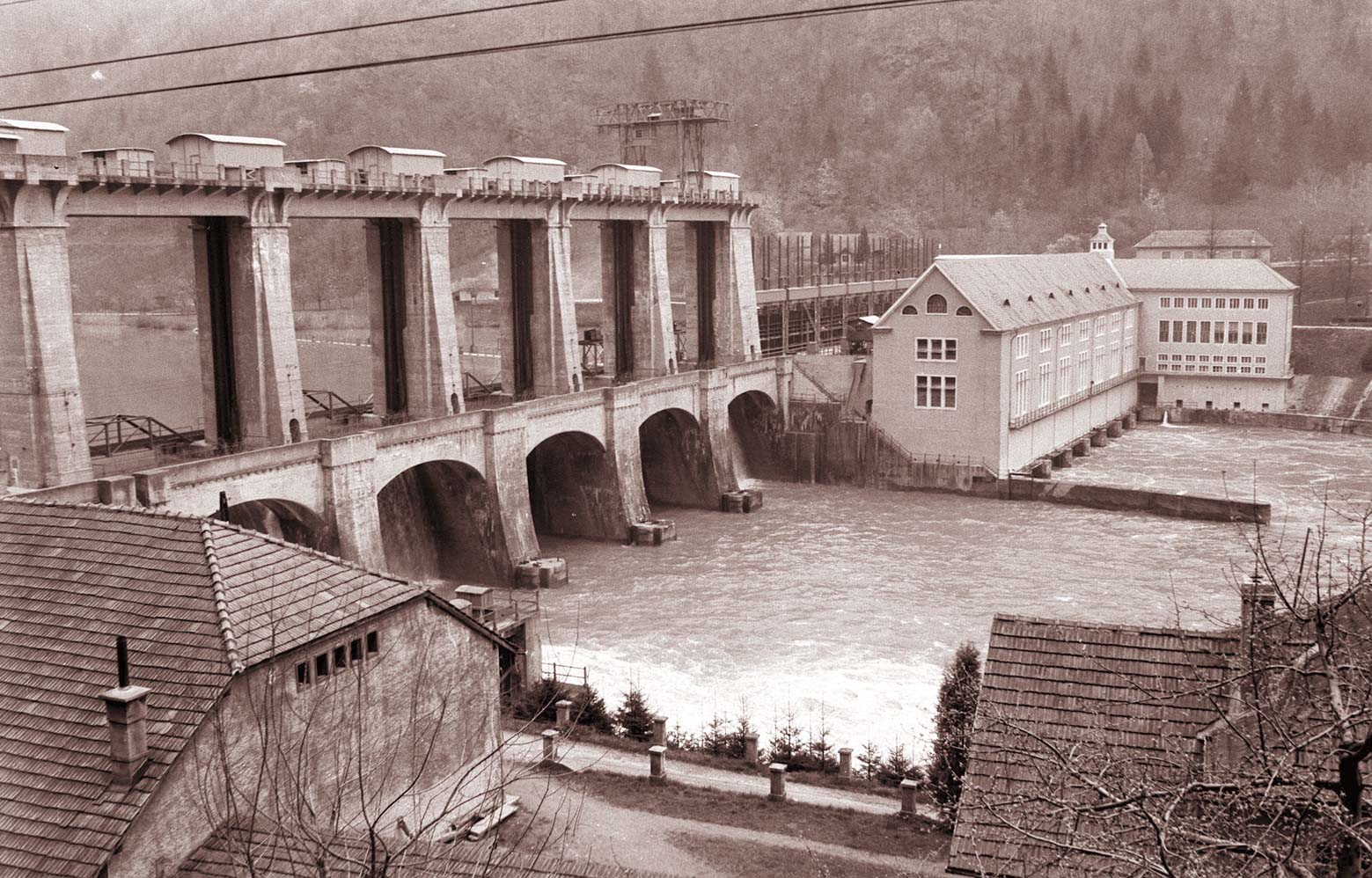
Hidroelektrarna Fala in 1960

== See also ==
- List of power stations in Slovenia
- List of longest running hydroelectric power plants
