= Ames Hydroelectric Generating Plant =

Hydroelectric power station

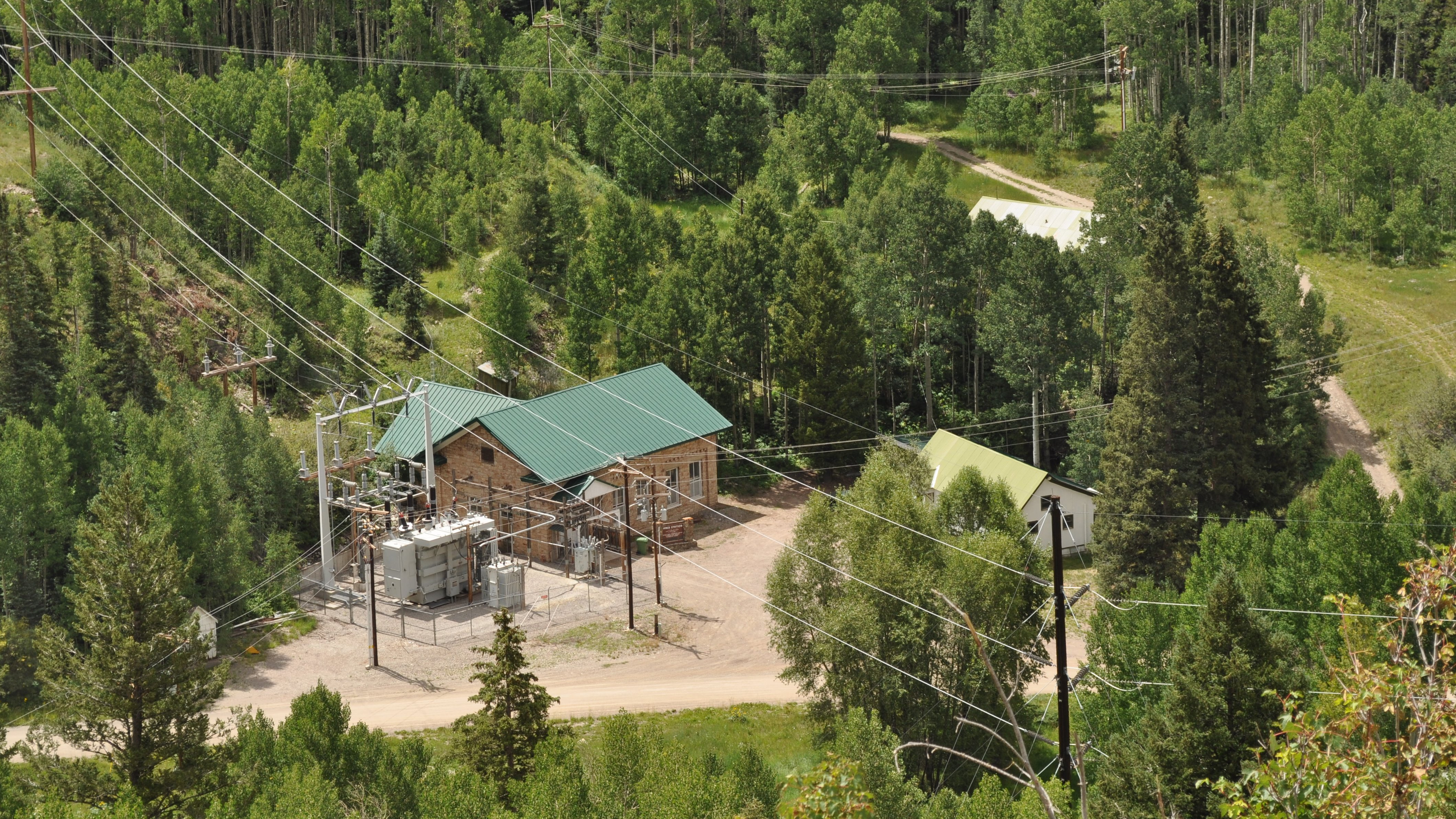
- Ames Hydroelectric Generating Plant in 2011
- Country: United States
- Location: Ames, Colorado, United States
- Coordinates: 37°51′52.88″N 107°52′55.18″W
- Status: Operational
- Commission date: 1891
- Owner: Xcel Energy

Thermal power station
- Turbine technology: Hydroelectric

Power generation
- Units operational: 1
- Nameplate capacity: 3.75 MW

External links
- Commons: Related media on Commons

The Ames Hydroelectric Generating Plant, constructed in 1890 near Ophir, Colorado, was one of the first (if not the first) commercial system to produce and transmit alternating current (AC) electricity for industrial use and one of the first AC hydro-electric plants ever constructed. It became operational in 1891 and was built by Westinghouse Electric around two of their large alternators. One was set up in the valley as a generator and driven by water. It was connected by a 2.6-mile (4.2 km) transmission line to the second alternator used as a motor up at the Gold King Mine to drive the mining operation. The facility has been changed and upgraded over the years but is still in operation. It is now on the List of IEEE Milestones.

== History ==
The need to power a stamp mill to process ore at the Gold King Mine up in the mountains near Ophir, Colorado drove major stock holder Lucien L. Nunn to seek a less expensive alternative to the wood powered steam mill at the site. Timber fuel was in scarce supply at the mines 12,000-foot height and coal could not be used because there was no railroad leading to the mine. The San Miguel River 3000 feet down the slope 3 miles from the mine looked to be a good power source but some of the methods of transmitting the power including water powered compressed air and belt drives did not seem feasible. Lucien's brother Paul, an electrical engineer, began looking into using electric motors to drive the plant. A 220 volt direct current electric system was found to be too expensive due to the size of the copper conductors needed to transmit such a low voltage the distances they were contemplating. A high voltage alternating current system looked more promising so they contacted Pittsburgh, Pennsylvania based Westinghouse Electric in 1890 and convinced them to supply an electricity driven system based on alternating current technology.

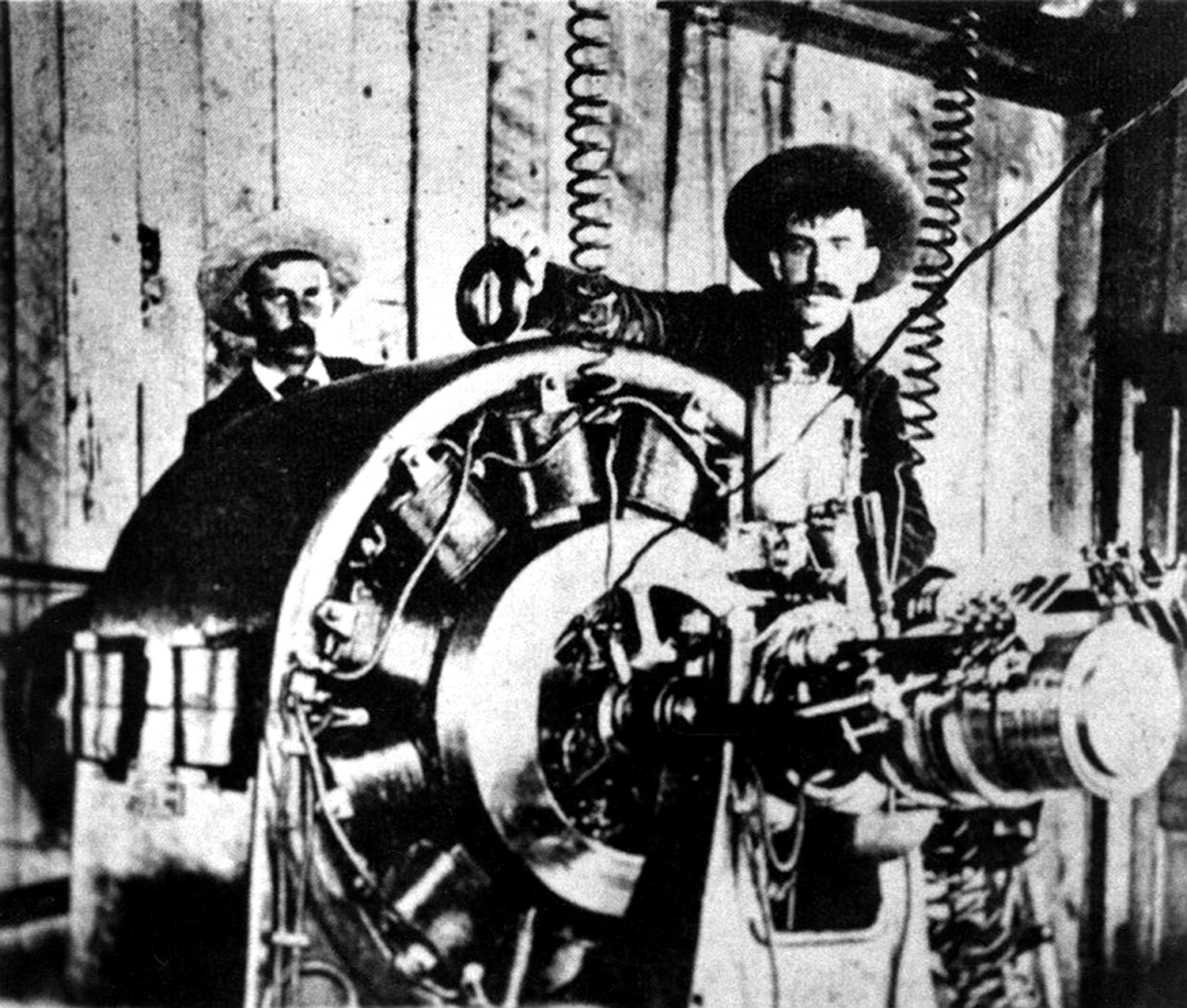
Workmen with one of the two Westinghouse alternators used in the original 1891 Ames Hydroelectric AC power installation

The AC system was engineered and installed by Westinghouse employees V.G. Converse, Lewis B. Stillwell, Charles F. Scott, and Ralph D. Mershon with the assistance of engineering students they recruited from Cornell University. In the summer of 1890 Westinghouse delivered the equipment and the engineers installed it later that winter. The system consisted of two identical 100-hp Westinghouse single-phase alternators (the largest the company made at the time). One was set up in a generator house, initially just a wooden shed, in the small settlement of Ames where the Howard Fork and Lake Fork streams joined to form the San Miguel River, just outside Ophir. Used as a generator, it produced 3000 volt, 133 Hertz, single-phase AC. It was driven by a six-foot Pelton wheel under a 320-foot (98 m) head of water carried in a 2 ft diameter steel pipe supplied by the Howard Fork and Lake Fork as well as natural reservoirs up hill from the plant. The electricity was transmitted 2.6 miles (4.2 km) up the mountain to the mine via two bare copper wires mounted on poles using Western Union cross-arms with insulators. Total wire costs were about US$700, about 1% of the cost estimated for a direct-current line. At the mine the second 100-hp Westinghouse alternator was installed in the role of a synchronous AC motor to drive the stamping mill. A smaller single-phase induction motor (a new type of motor developed from patents Westinghouse had licensed from inventor Nikola Tesla) was installed as a starter motor to spin the larger alternator up to match the synchronous speed of the generator.

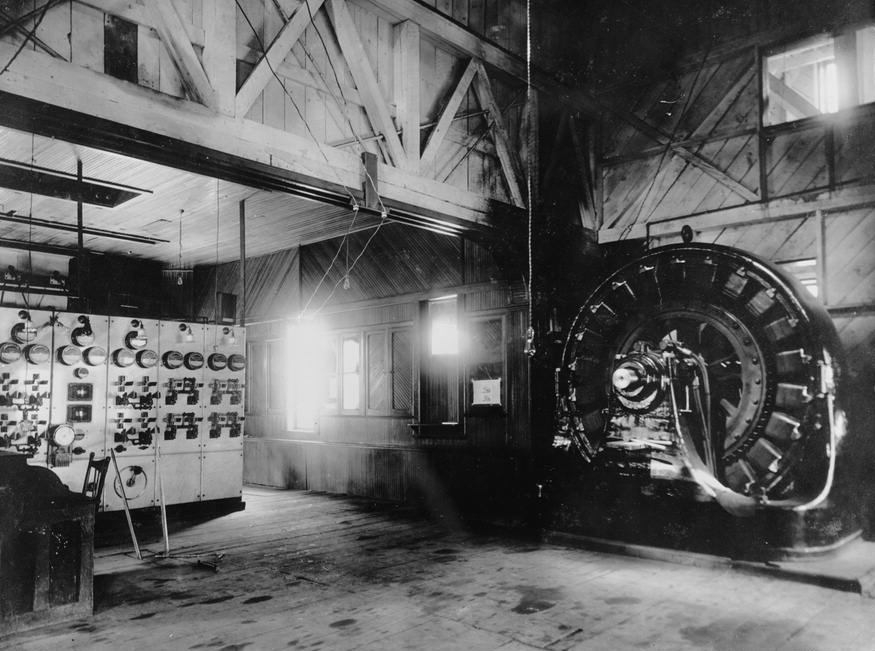
Interior view, 1895 Ames powerhouse

The power system became operational on 19 June 1891 and was run continuously for the first 30 days. The entire plant required 15 to 20 attendants for its operation. The instruments and controls were rudimentary, solenoid type gravity balance Voltmeters and ammeters mounted on lacquered wooden boards. Workers had to take special care because of the high voltages used. Power was connected by closing simple knife switches and the system was shut down (the electrical circuit "opened") by a worker grabbing a connecting line at the power pole and pulling it out of the arc-light style plug mounted on the pole (a sometimes dangerous maneuver that produced 6 to 8-foot (1.83-m to 2.44-m) long high voltage arcs). One continual problem was repairing damage from lightning strikes, a common occurrence at the mountainous location. The alternators were set on paraffin-soaked oak platforms to add insulation and Westinghouse engineers tried various types of lightning arresters. The alternators were designed with removable parts making the task of repairing them a little easier.

With the success of the plant the Nunns started installing similar systems at their other mining operations. In 1896 the Ames plant was rebuilt with a new two-phase system with new generators and induction motors along with step-up transformers to boost the power to 10,000 volts for longer distance transmission. The water supply was also expanded.

The Ames plant became part of the Nunn's Telluride Power Company which would later become part of Western Colorado Power Company, formed as a wholly owned subsidiary of Utah Power and Light. Public Service Company acquired the plant with other Colorado Ute properties in 1992.

A 1905 vintage power house is still in service for Public Service Company, a subsidiary of Xcel Energy, with two Pelton wheels powering a single 1904 General Electric generator, with output of 2,400 volts, and 1,082 amperes at a speed of 225 R.P.M.

== Significance in the history of the electrical energy supply ==
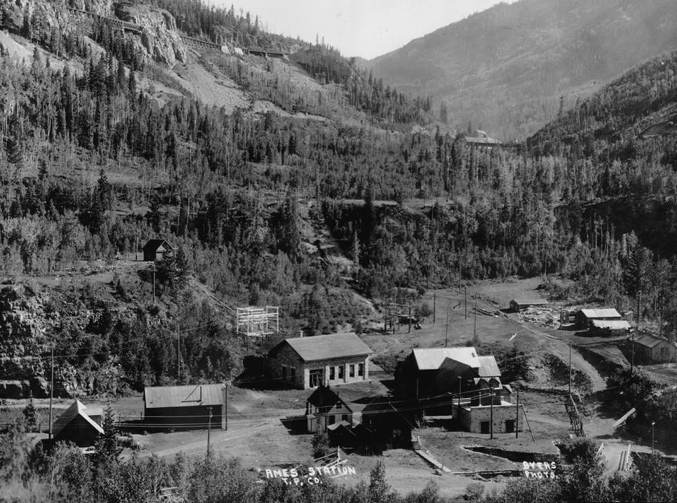
Overall view of Ames plant, early 20th century

The Ames power station was built at the end of a decade that saw the rapid expansion in the use of alternating current as a power transmission format. During this period Westinghouse was in stiff competition with other AC companies as well with Thomas Edison's direct current based Edison Electric Company. A propaganda campaign/"war of currents" had even broken out between Westinghouse and Edison. Westinghouse Electric looked on the Ames project as a great way to demonstrate the capability of the AC system they had been developing since they installed their first AC transformer based lighting systems in Great Barrington, Massachusetts, in March 1886.

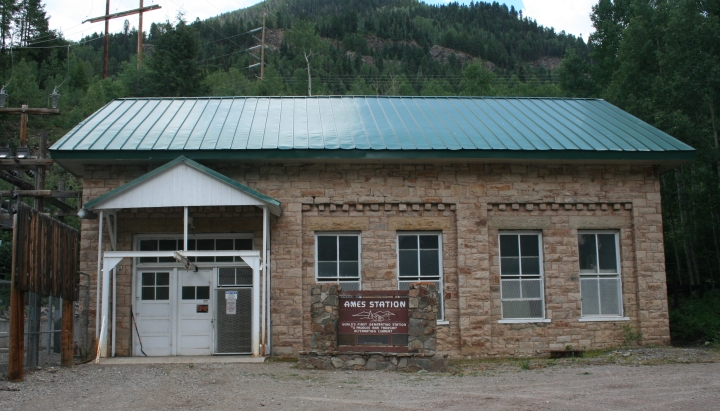
2010 exterior view of Ames Power Station, built 1905.

The 1891 Ames Hydroelectric Generating Plant is one of the oldest power plants to produce and transmit alternating current for an industrial purposes. It predated by one month the Lauffen Dam to Frankfurt power-transmission system at International Electrotechnical Exhibition that powered lights and some electric motors.

As a hydro-electric plant in the US it was predated by the Oregon-based Willamette Falls Electric Company, the first AC hydro-electric generation facility, in 1889, which included a 14-mile-long (23-kilometre) transmission line to Portland, used to power arc lighting. The oldest hydroelectric power plant supplying a commercial transmission system for alternating current was the power plant Thorenberg near Lucerne in Switzerland. The plant started operation in May 1886 and fed 1,800 volts to a nearly 3-mile-long (4.8 km) transmission line. It was transformed to 100 volts to illuminate some hotels and restaurants in the downtown area of the city.

The original Ames/Gold King plant is also notable for the small starter motor used, an early use of the induction motor, a new efficient commutator-less design that would later become commonplace. The patent for the motor had been licensed by Westinghouse from Nikola Tesla two years earlier and was being developed by Charles F. Scott, but engineering problems and the general shortage of cash the company was going through was holding back development. Westinghouse eventually introduced their "Tesla" poly-phase transmission/motor system in 1893.

== Image gallery ==
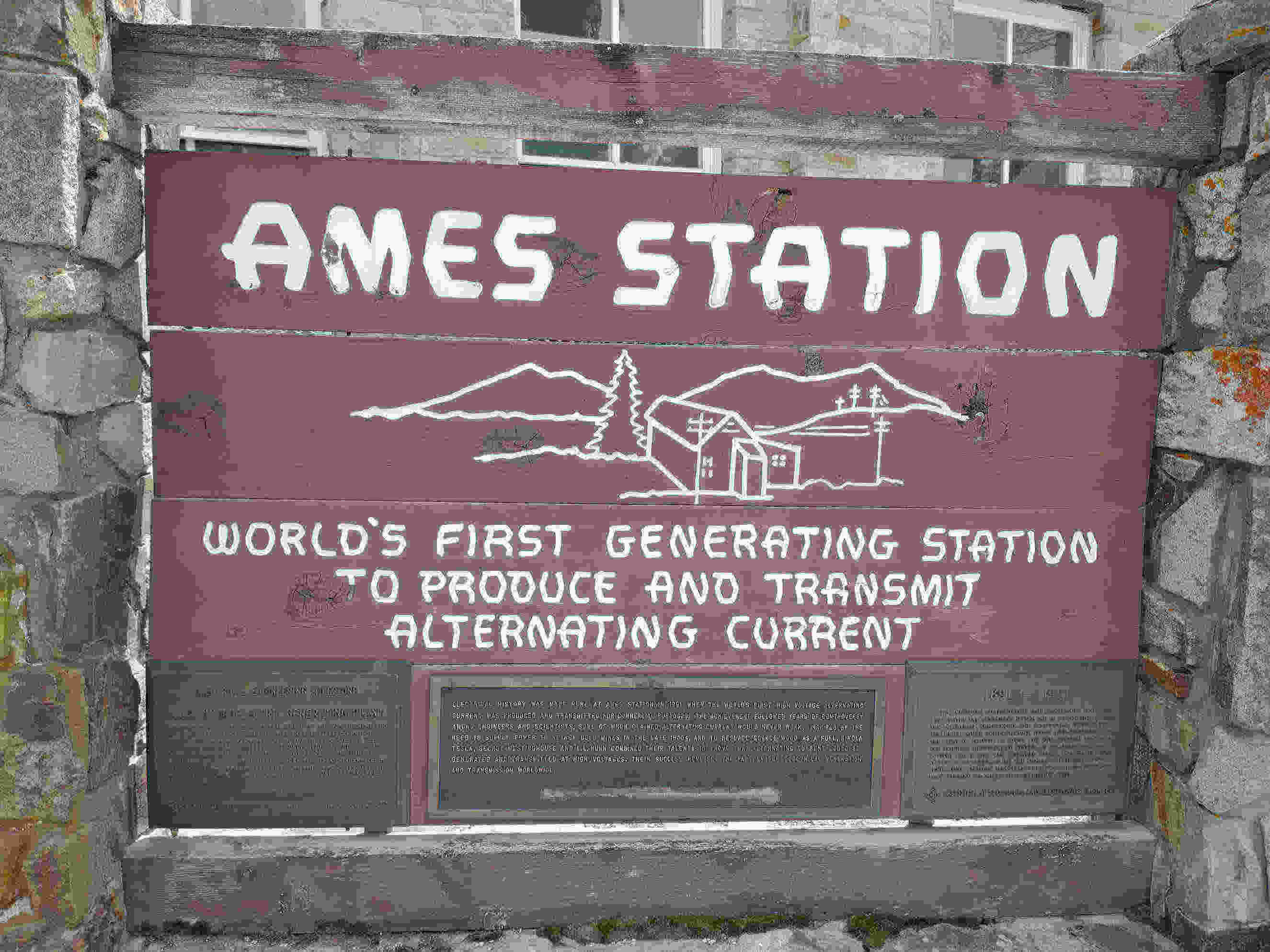
Information sign at the Ames hydro station.

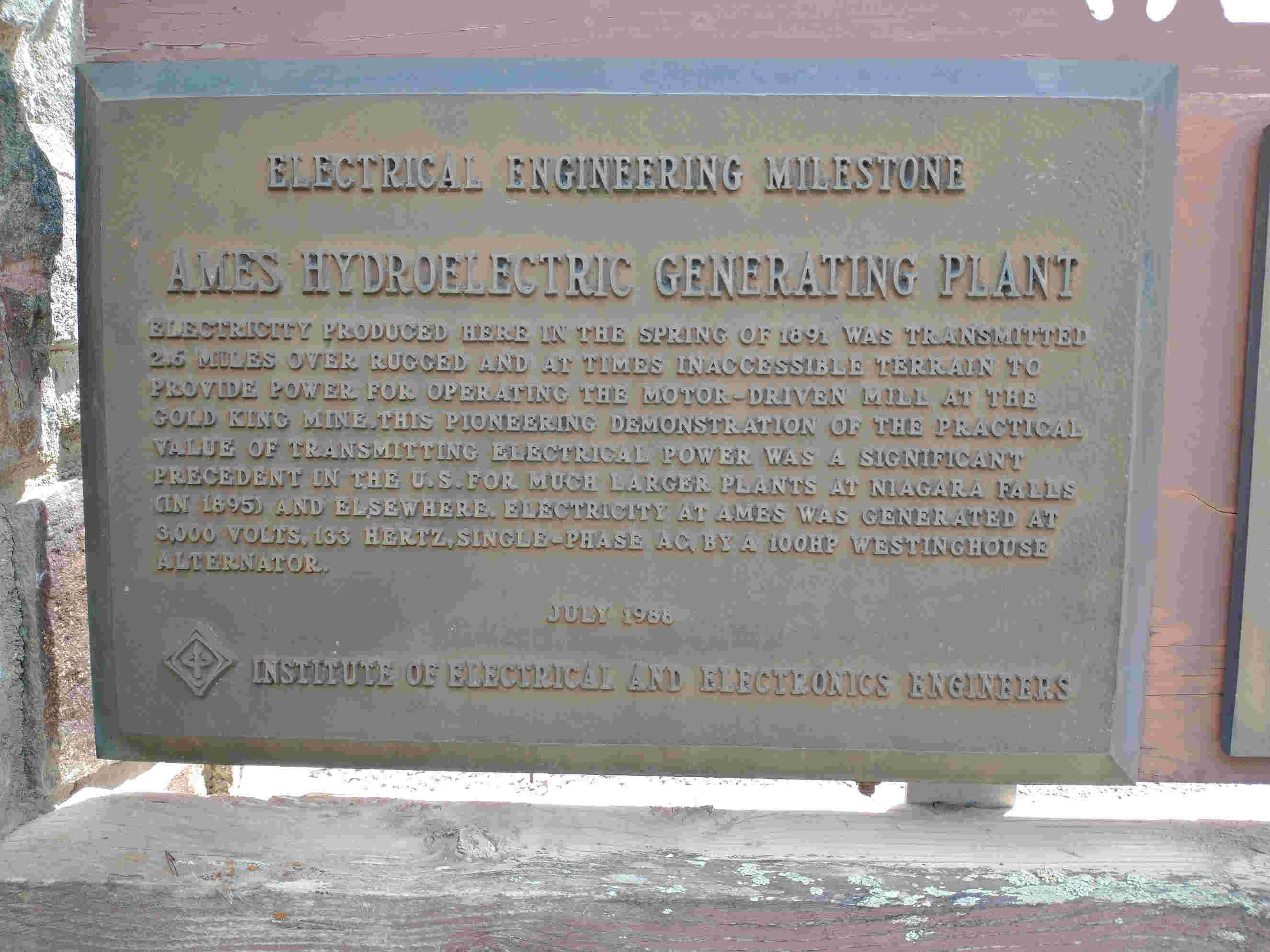
Info sign left detail.

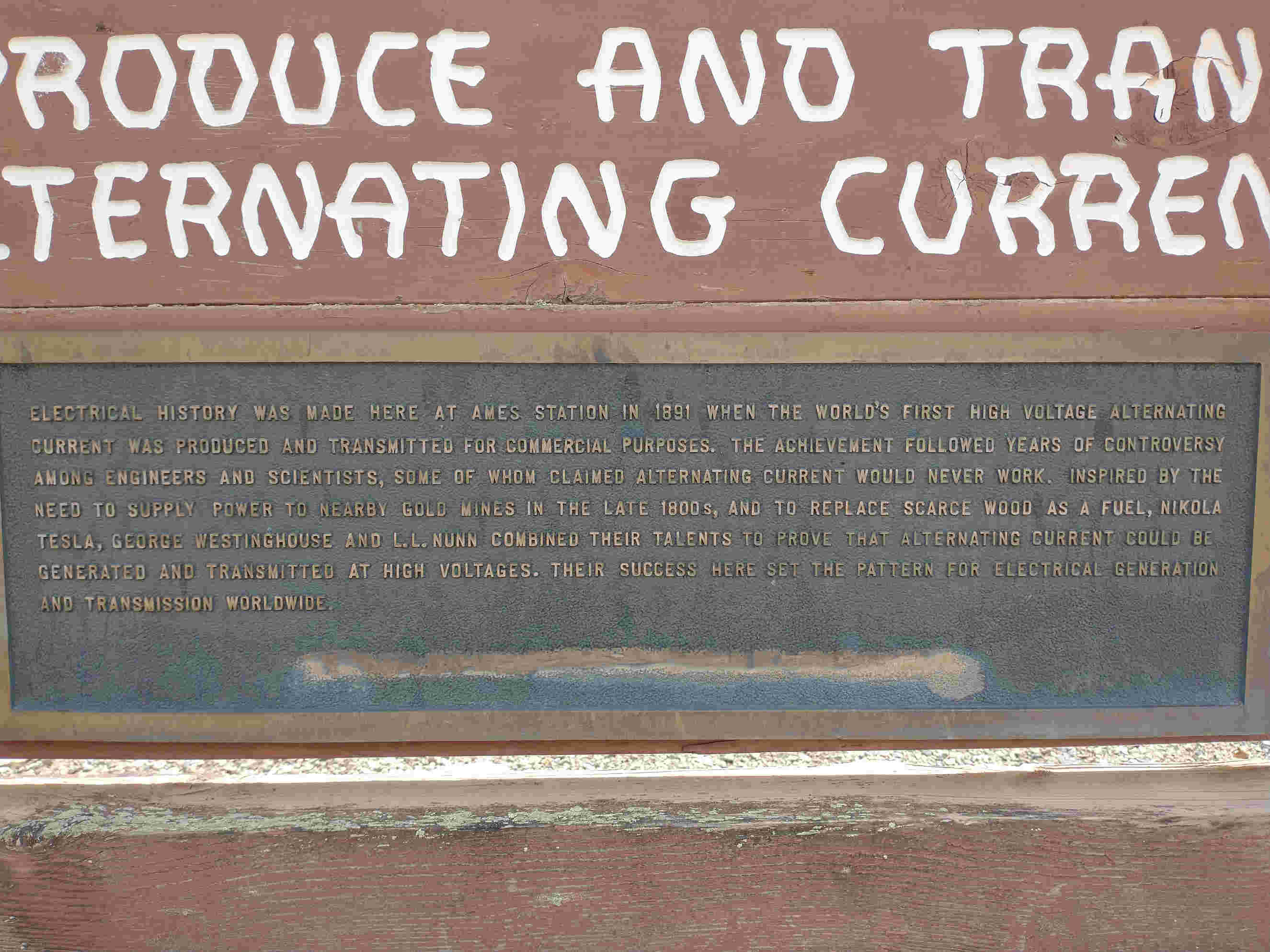
Info sign center detail.

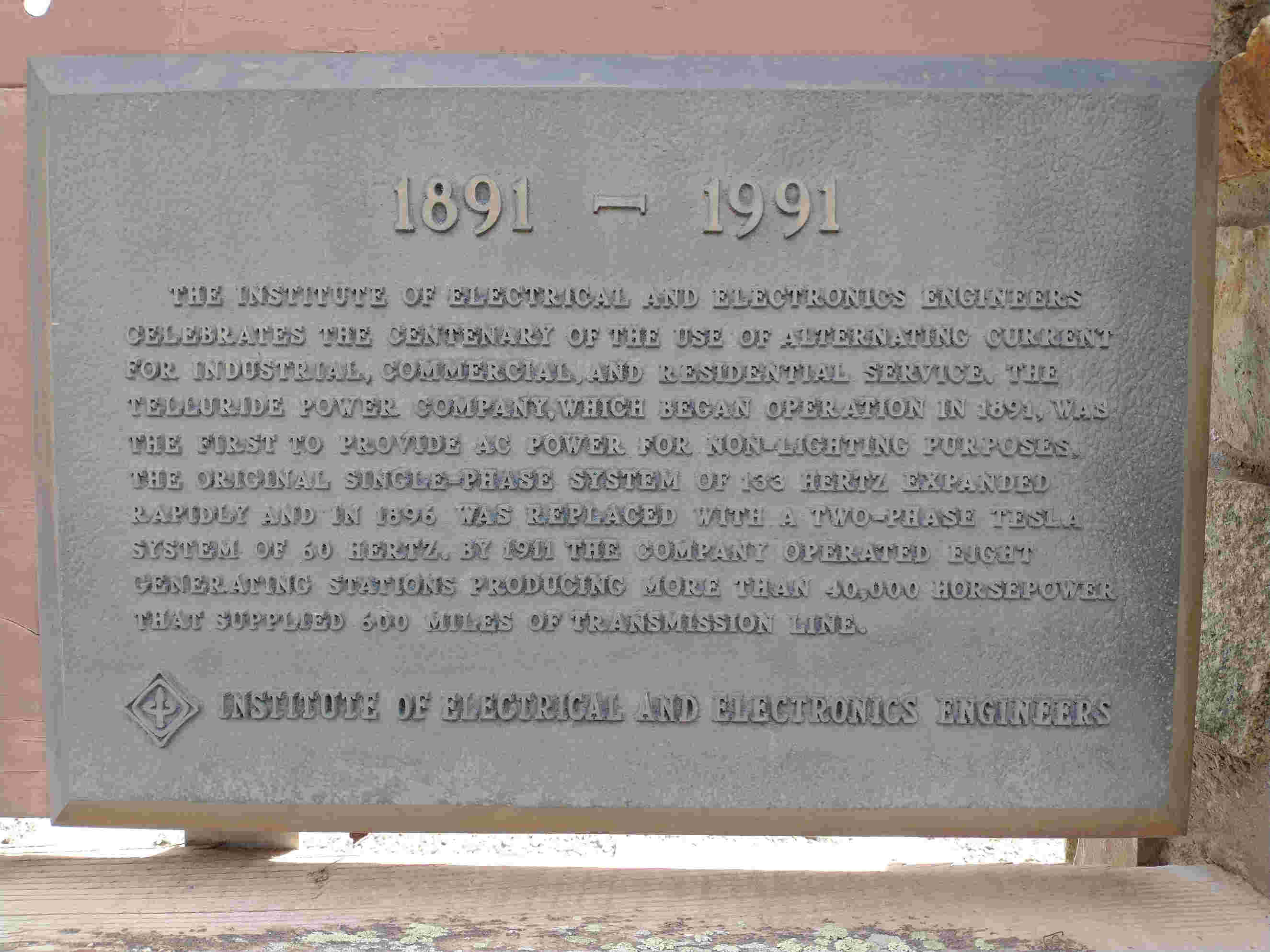
Info sign right detail.

== See also ==
- List of longest running hydroelectric power plants
