= Krško Nuclear Power Plant =

Nuclear power plant in Slovenia

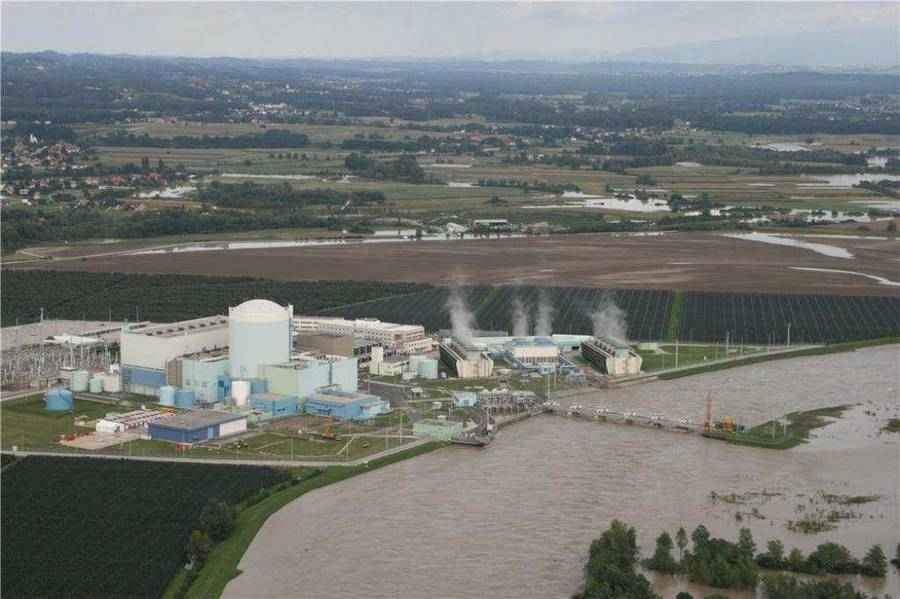
- Official name: Nuklearna elektrarna Krško
- Country: Slovenia
- Coordinates: 45°56′18″N 15°30′56″E
- Status: Operational
- Construction began: 1975
- Commission date: January 1, 1983
- Construction cost: $649.2 million
- Owners: GEN Energija; Hrvatska elektroprivreda
- Operator: Nuklearna Elektrarna Krško
- Employees: 659 (2023)

Nuclear power station
- Reactor type: PWR
- Annual revenue: 239,991,197 € (2023)

Power generation
- Units operational: 1 x 730 MW
- Nameplate capacity: 696 MW
- Capacity factor: 89.1%
- Annual net output: 5,700 GW·h

External links
- Website: www.nek.si/en/
- Commons: Related media on Commons

The Krško Nuclear Power Plant (Slovene: Jedrska elektrarna Krško, JEK, or Nuklearna elektrarna Krško, NEK, [ˈkə́ɾʃkɔ]; Croatian: Nuklearna elektrana Krško) is located in Vrbina in the City Municipality of Krško, Slovenia. The plant was connected to the power grid on October 2, 1981, and went into commercial operation on January 15, 1983. It was built as a joint venture by Slovenia and Croatia which were both part of Yugoslavia at the time.

The plant is a 2-loop Westinghouse pressurized water reactor, with a rated thermal capacity of 1,994 thermal megawatts (MW_{t}) and 696 megawatts-electric (MW_{e}). It runs on enriched uranium (up to 5 weight-percent ^{235}U), fuel mass 48.7 t, with 121 fuel elements, demineralized water as the moderator, and 36 bundles of 20 control rods each made of silver, indium and cadmium alloys to regulate power. Its sister power plant is Angra I in Brazil.

The operating company Nuklearna elektrarna Krško (NEK) is co-owned by the Slovenian state-owned company Gen Energija and the Croatian state-owned company Hrvatska elektroprivreda (HEP). The power plant provides more than one-quarter of Slovenia's and 15% of Croatia's power.

== History ==
In the early 1970s, Tito's government of Yugoslavia recognized the need for additional electrical production in the constituent republics of Croatia and Slovenia. With a domestic source of uranium available, proposals were obtained from Siemens (Germany) and Westinghouse (USA) for a single nuclear power station of a practical size. With the agreement of the U.S. government, Westinghouse won the competition to supply a plant based upon the Angra power plant being constructed in Brazil at that time. The Yugoslav management in 1975 consisted of personnel from both the Slovenian and Croatian power companies and a representative from the central government in Belgrade. As the design began, it was recognized that Westinghouse had a more modern design underway for the KORI-2 plant which is now the sister plant of Krško. Indeed, when the Krško Plant began producing power in 1981, it preceded both the Angra and Kori-2 plants.

The reason for the plant being co-owned by two countries was that these then-constituent republics of Yugoslavia planned to build two plants, one in each republic, according to the original 1970 agreement and its revised version from 1982. However, that plan was abandoned in 1987 due to disagreements over funding and electricity price. From that point on, there arose an issue with nuclear waste storage, because the only existing waste storage site was in Slovenia.

In 1997, ELES and NEK decided to increase the operational and decommissioning costs billed to both ELES and HEP, but the latter refused to pay. In 1998, the Government of Slovenia nationalized NEK, stopped supplying power from Krško to HEP, and sued HEP for the unpaid bills. In 1999, HEP counter-sued for damages because of lack of supply. In January 2001, the leaders of the two countries agreed on equal ownership of the Krško plant, joint responsibility for the nuclear waste, and the compensation of mutual claims. The joint management of the plant was to begin on January 1, 2002. The plant was expected to start supplying Croatia with electricity by July 1, 2002 at the latest, but the connection was only established in 2003 because of protests from the local population. Since then, HEP has additionally sued the Slovenian side for damages during the latest one-year period when Krško wasn't supplying power to it. In December 2015, the International Centre for Settlement of Investment Disputes ruled in favor of HEP, awarding it more than €40 million in damages, interest and attorneys' fees.

In 2015, a 20-year life extension to the initial 40-year operational lifetime was agreed.

The plant is projected to withstand earthquakes up to the strength of the 1511 Idrija earthquake, the worst quake in Slovenia's history. It was seismically retrofitted after the 2011 Fukushima nuclear disaster. In 2020, the plant was inspected following the Zagreb earthquake, and pre-emptively shut down for several days after the stronger Petrinja earthquake. In neither case did the inspections find any damage.

In 2023, it was agreed to extend the operation of the nuclear plant until 2043.

== Waste disposal and retirement plans ==
High level nuclear waste is stored in the spent fuel pool, as is the usual practice for nuclear power stations. Onsite dry storage is planned to be built to take the plant to its revised end-of-life date of 2043. Low level waste is stored at the power station and secondary repositories.

French company Framatome won a contract to upgrade the plant in 2021.

== June 2008 incident ==
After a coolant leak on June 4, 2008, the European Commission set off an EU wide alarm through the European Community Urgent Radiological Information Exchange (ECURIE). The power plant was safely shut down to the hot zero power mode after a small leak in the cooling circuit. The leak was immediately located and treated. According to the Slovenian Nuclear Safety Administration (the country's nuclear watchdog agency), no radioactive release into the environment occurred and none is expected. The event did not affect employees, the nearby population, or the environment. Slovenian authorities immediately alerted the proper international institutions, including the International Atomic Energy Agency (IAEA) and ECURIE. The EU then notified (through ECURIE) the remaining EU member states, issuing an EU-wide alert. Several news agencies around the world then reported on the incident. According to Greenpeace such an EU-wide alert is very unusual. Surprisingly, the Croatian authorities were not directly informed about the incident, although Croatia is a participant in the ECURIE system. Many Croatians heard the news first through foreign media and expatriates, although Krško is located a mere 15 km from the Croatian border.

According to Nuclear Expertise groups, national entities within the European union, such as the ASN in France, this incident was wrongly reported to ECURIE. ECURIE, when receiving a notification, has an obligation to forward it to all parties. In this particular situation, the notification turned out to be useless (i.e., a false alarm). This type of incident (a small leakage on primary pumps) is a relatively common occurrence in nuclear power plants.

== Possible expansion ==
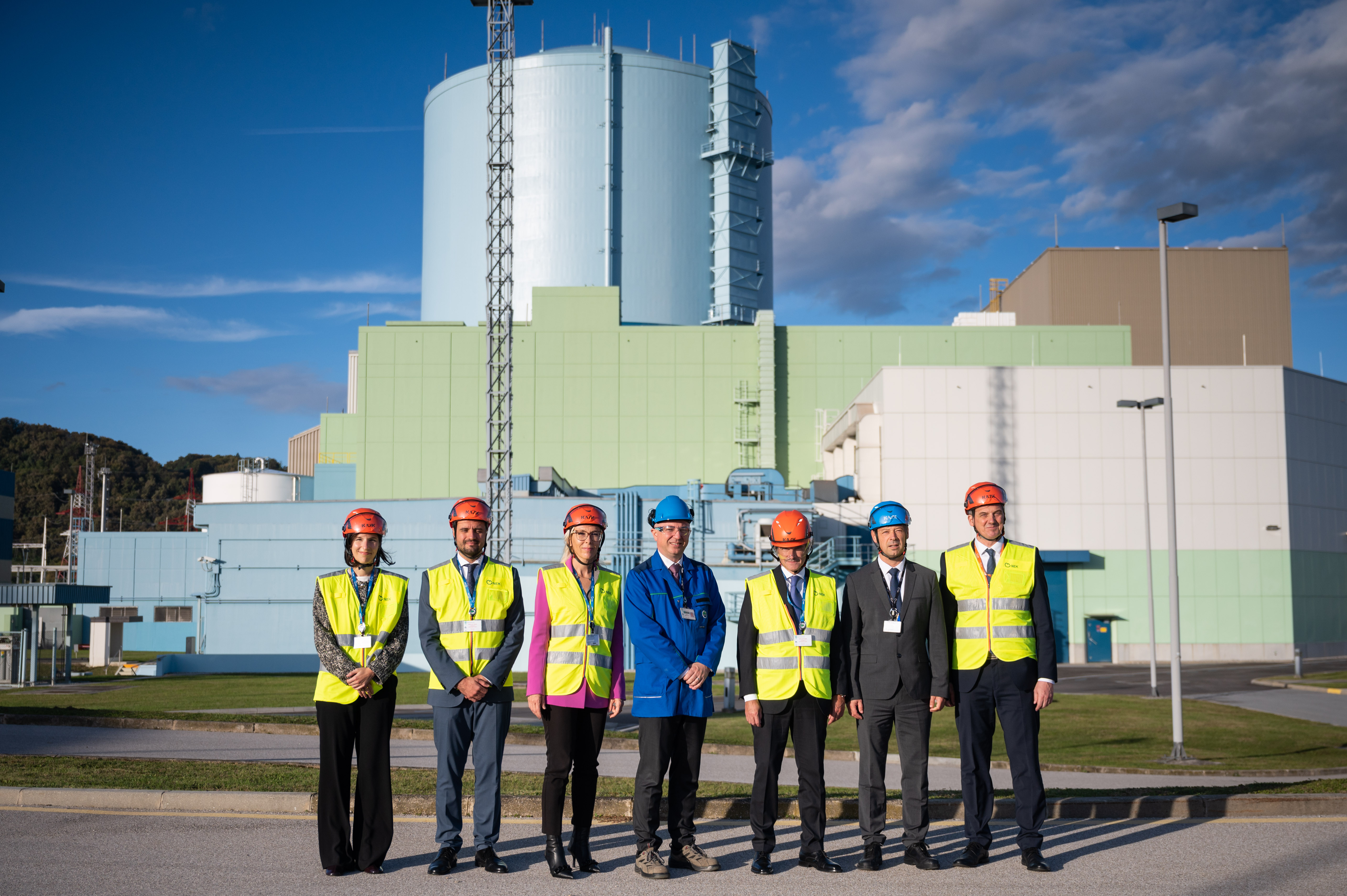
2024

On March 28, 2022, the Prime Minister of Croatia, Andrej Plenković, stated that he supports the expansion of the nuclear power plant, while depending on Slovenia. On 2 November 2022, Slovenian Prime Minister Robert Golob said there will be a referendum to get public approval for a second reactor at Krško, once a reactor technology was selected. In August 2024, prime minister Golob committed to holding a referendum on a two-unit expansion of up to 2400 MWe, possibly to take place in late 2024 after key documents were published. If agreed, a final investment decision would be taken in 2028, for construction to start in 2032. The referendum was later cancelled.

== See also ==
- Nuclear energy in Slovenia
- List of commercial nuclear reactors § Slovenia
- Energy in Slovenia
