= Doblar =

- Location in Slovenia
- Coordinates: 46°6′55.46″N 13°41′20″E
- Country: Slovenia
- Traditional region: Littoral
- Statistical region: Gorizia
- Municipality: Kanal ob Soči

Area
  - Total: 5.14 km^{2} (1.98 sq mi)
- Elevation: 201.7 m (662 ft)

Population (2002)
  - Total: 236

Doblar (pronounced [ˈdoːblaɾ]) is a settlement on the right bank of the Soča River in the Municipality of Kanal ob Soči in the Littoral region of Slovenia. The settlement extends along the valley of Doblarec Creek, a tributary of the Soča.
