= Medvode =

- Town
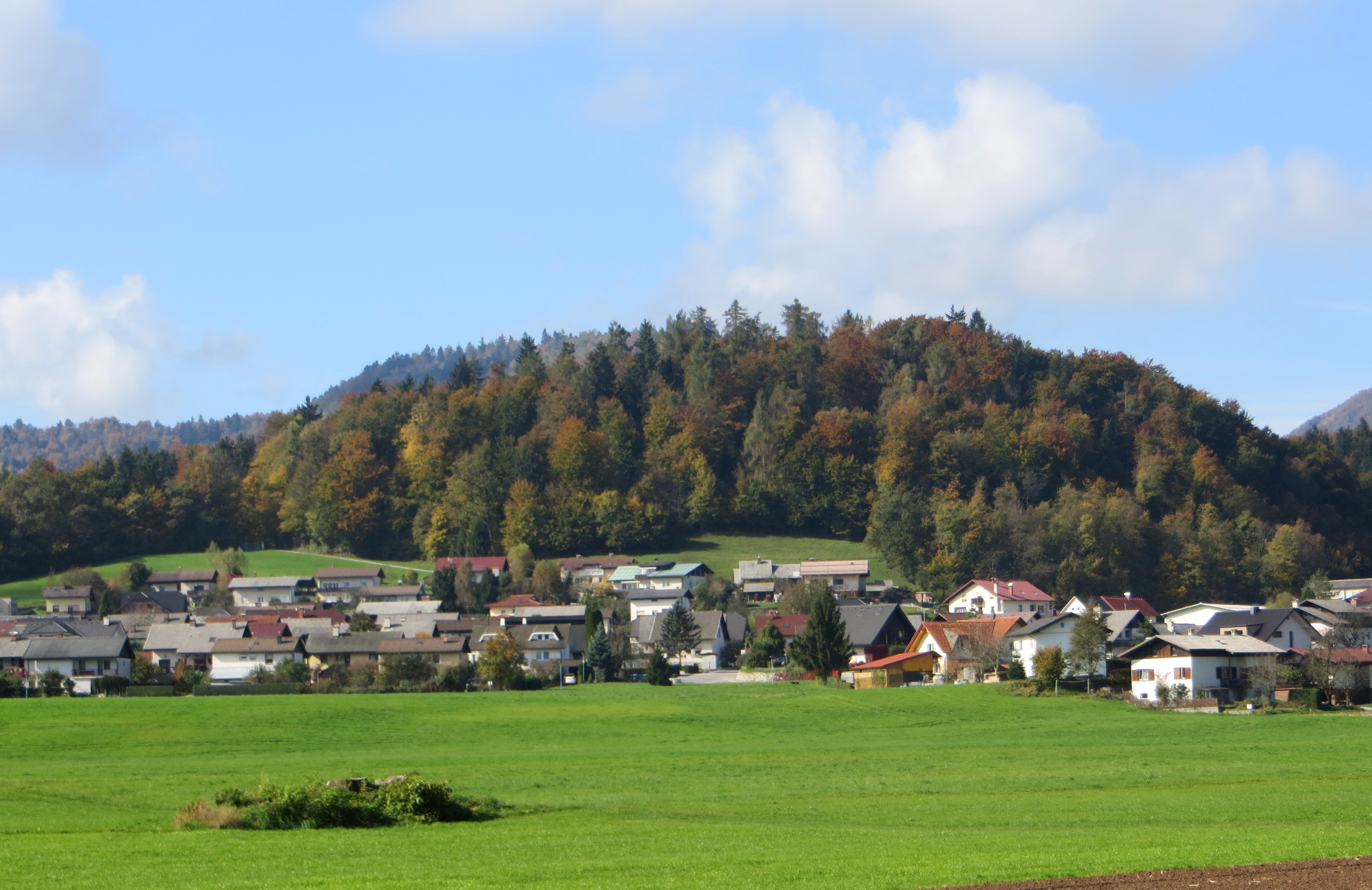
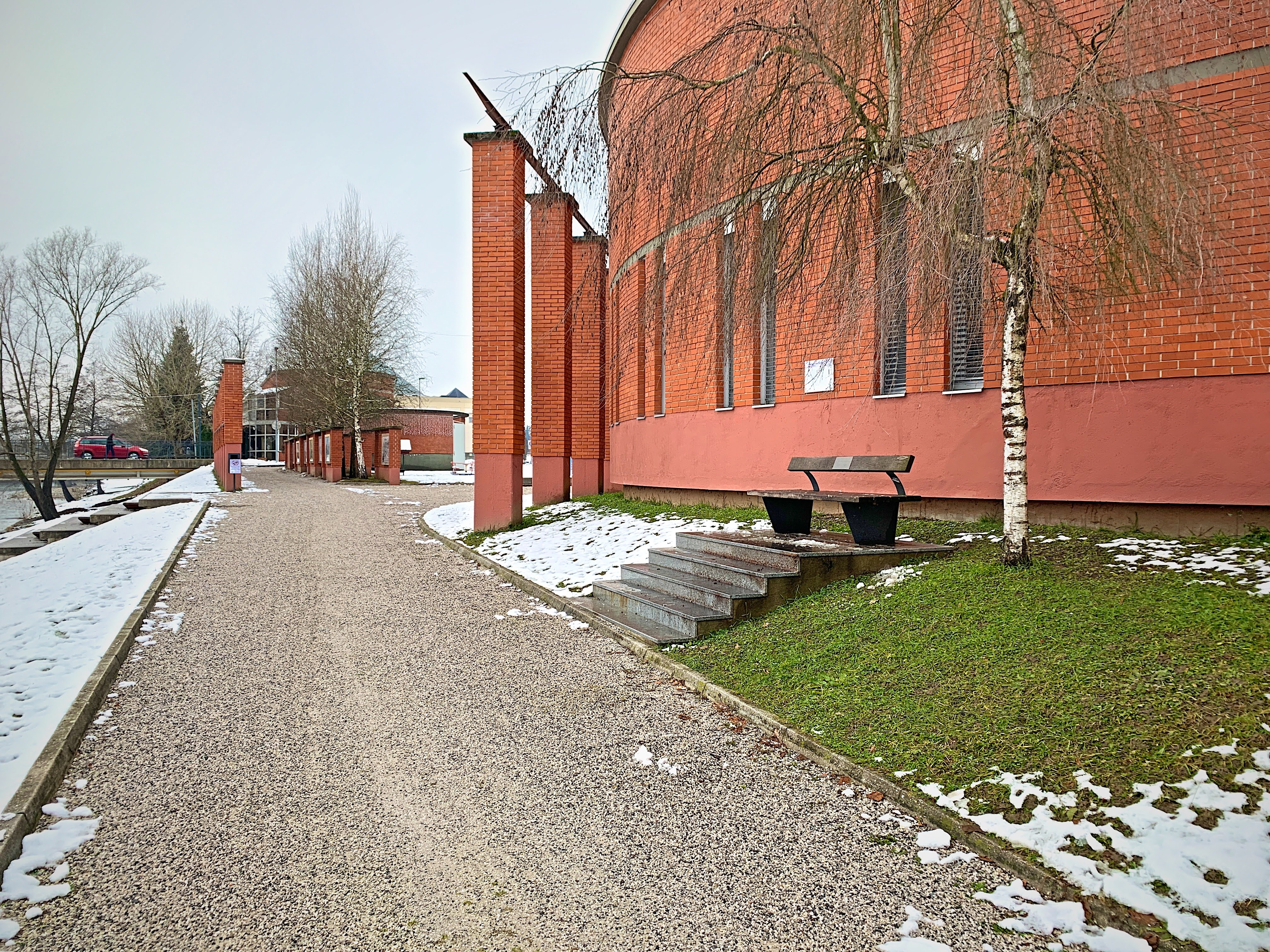
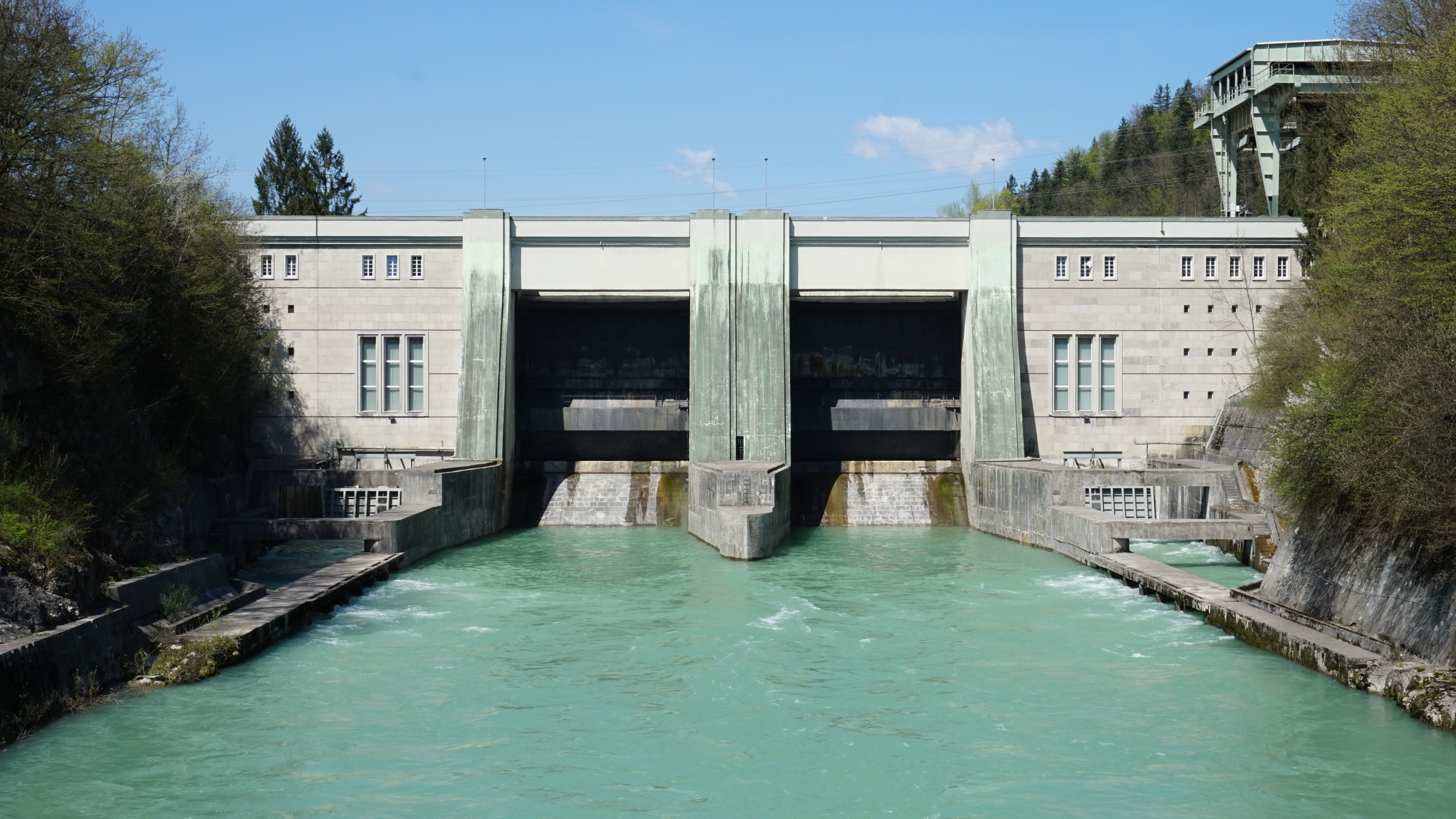
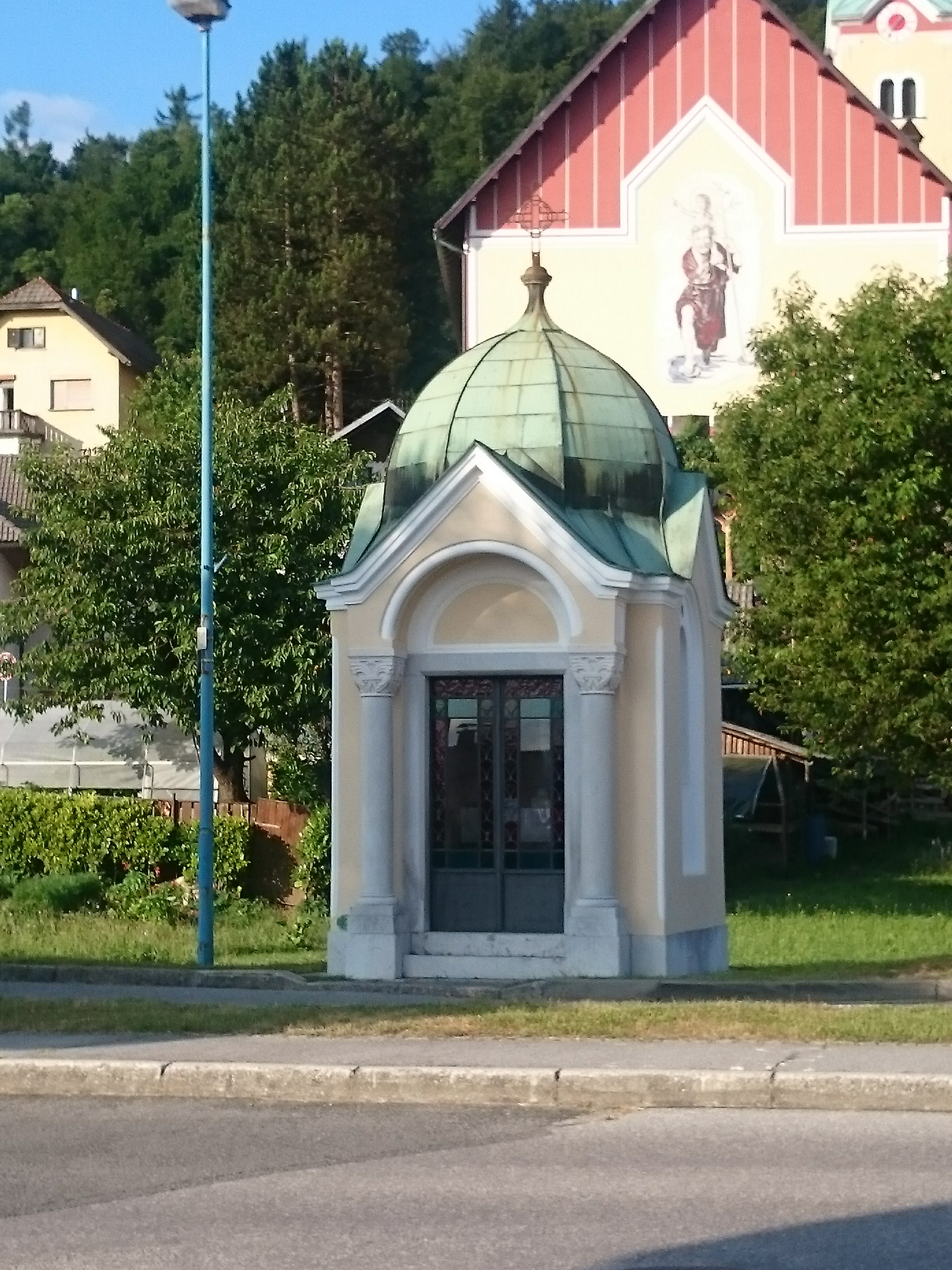
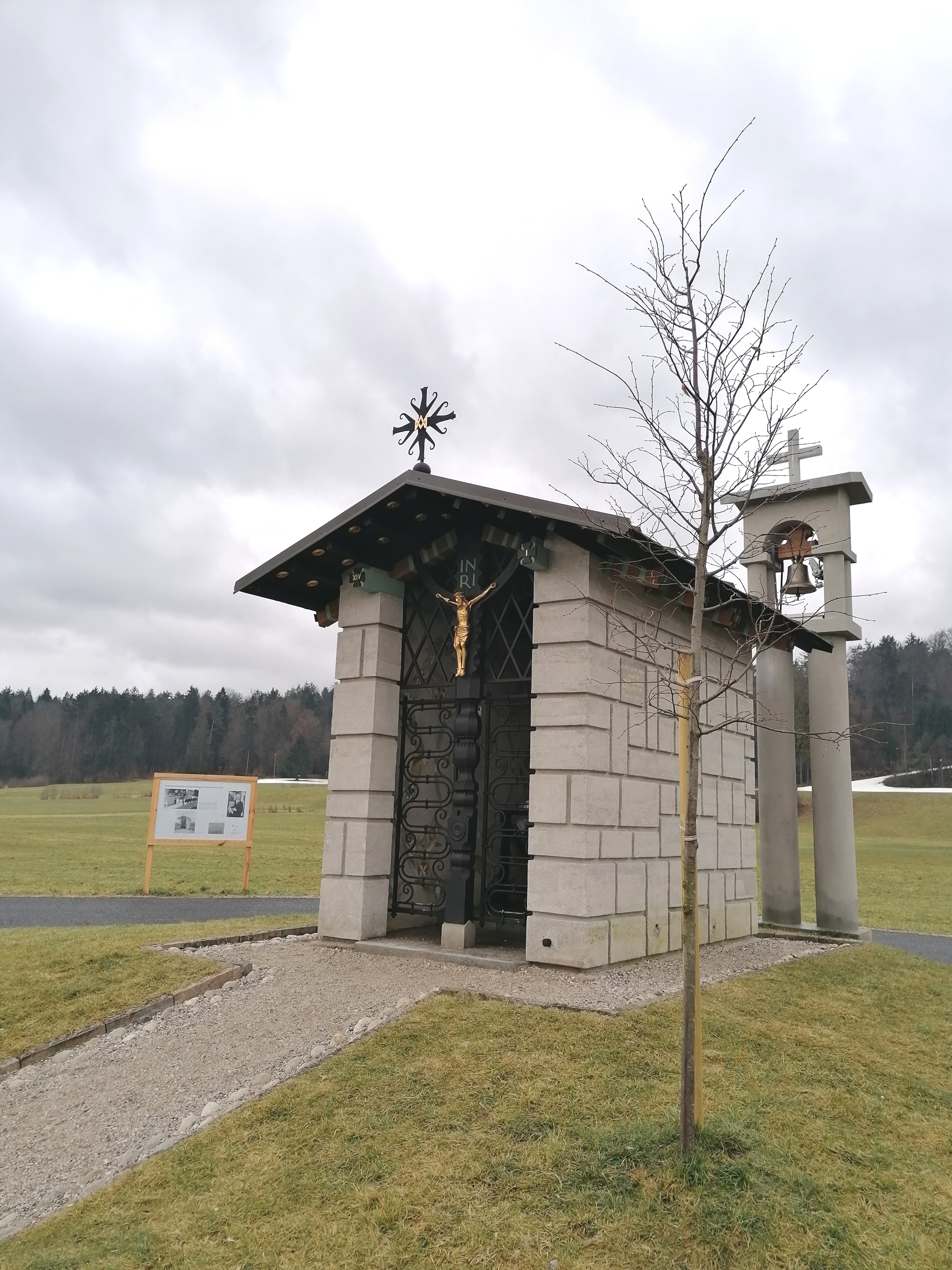
- From top, left to right: Overview of Medvode and Preska, Library, Hydroelectric power plant, Mary's Chapel and St. John's Church, Hafner Chapel

- Flag Coat of arms

- Location in Slovenia
- Coordinates: 46°8′17.67″N 14°24′52.97″E
- Country: Slovenia
- Traditional region: Upper Carniola
- Statistical region: Central Slovenia
- Municipality: Medvode

Area
  - Total: 4.20 km^{2} (1.62 sq mi)
- Elevation: 313.6 m (1,029 ft)

Population (2019)
  - Total: 5,380

Medvode (pronounced [mɛˈdʋóːdɛ]; German: Zwischenwässern) is a town in Slovenia. It is the seat of the Municipality of Medvode. The Sava and Sora rivers join in Medvode, from which the town's name (which means 'between the waters') is derived.

== History ==
Following the annexation of Carantania by Bavarians, the area came under control of Germanic nobles and feudalists. These noticed that the nearby Medanski hill provided a good view over the Medvode and Ljubljana Basin.

Medvode gained greater importance in the 15th century, when the Emperor gave Kranj, Radovljica and Trzin the right to build a bridge and collect bridge tolls. In the 19th century, the town also began collecting road tolls.

During that period, Medvode also got a railway station and a savings bank. Due to that, industry began to develop in the town as well, along with an older paper mill in Goričane. A food oil factory was established in Medvode prior to the First World War. During the Interwar, textile and carpentry industries were established as well, many of which persist up until this day (namely the factory Donit).

After the Second World War, a Yugoslav labor camp for political prisoners operated in Medvode.

== Industry ==
Two large factories, Color and Donit, are based in Medvode. The Sava River at Medvode is also the location of the Medvode Hydroelectric Power Plant. The hydroelectric plant was built in part using forced labor by Catholic priests held as political prisoners after the Second World War. There are a total of 1570 companies registered in Medvode that generate a total of 454,714,000€ annually.

Previously, there was a lead and quicksilver mine in Ločnica Valley, to the south of Medvode. In the 19th century, the town was increasingly famous to cities as far as Vienna as a tourist spot. The Sora River once attracted many bathers. During summers, a special vacations train connected the town with Kranj and Ljubljana. In 2018, a total of 35,802 tourists spent their nights in Medvode, including 33,966 foreign and 1,836 Slovene ones.
