= Electrofiltration =

Electrofiltration is a method that combines membrane filtration and electrophoresis in a dead-end process.

Electrofiltration is regarded as an appropriate technique for concentration and fractionation of biopolymers. The film formation on the filter membrane which hinders filtration can be minimized or completely avoided by the application of electric field, improving filtration’s performance and increasing selectivity in case of fractionation. This approach reduces significantly the expenses for downstream processing in bioprocesses.

== Technique ==
Figure 1: Schematic representation of an electrofiltration chamber

Electrofiltration is a technique for separation and concentration of colloidal substances – for instance biopolymers. The principle of electrofiltration is based on overlaying electric field on a standard dead-end filtration. Thus the created polarity facilitates electrophoretic force which is opposite to the resistance force of the filtrate flow and directs the charged biopolymers. This provides extreme decrease in the film formation on the micro- or ultra-filtration membranes and the reduction of filtration time from several hours by standard filtration to a few minutes by electrofiltration. In comparison to cross-flow filtration electrofiltration exhibits not only increased permeate flow but also guarantees reduced shear force stress which qualifies it as particularly mild technique for separation of biopolymers that are usually unstable.

The promising application in purification of biotechnological products is based on the fact that biopolymers are difficult for filtration but on the other hand they are usually charged as a result of the presence of amino and carboxyl groups. The objective of electrofiltration is to prevent the formation of filter cake and to improve the filtration kinetic of products difficult to filtrate.

The electrophoresis of the particles and the electro-osmosis become essential when the filtration process is overlaid with electric field. By electrofiltration the conventional filtration is overlaid with an electric field (DC) which works parallel with the filtrate’s flow direction. When the electrophoretic force F_{E}, oppositely directed to flow, overruns the hydrodynamic resistance force F_{W}, the charged particles migrate from the filter medium, thus reducing significantly the thickness of the filter cake on the membrane.

When the solid particles, subject to separation, are negatively charged they migrate towards the anode (positive pole) and deposit on the filter cloth situated there. As a result, on the cathode side’s membrane (negative pole) there is only a very thin film allowing nearly the whole filtrate to efflux through this membrane.

Figure 1 presents schematic description of electrofiltration chamber with flushing electrodes. For the flushing circulation a buffer solution is used. This approach has been patented.

== Fundamental ==
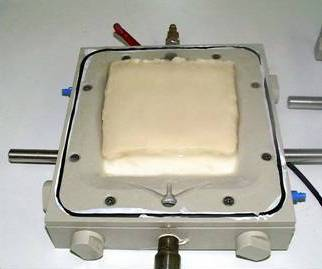
Figure 2: Filter cake of xanthan on filter plate

The hydrodynamic resistance force is evaluated following the Stokes’ law.

$$F_W = 6\cdot\pi\cdot\eta\cdot\text{r}_{H}\cdot\nu$$

The electrophoretic force is evaluated following the Coulomb’s law.

$$F_E = 4\cdot\pi\cdot\varepsilon_{0}\cdot\varepsilon_{r}\cdot\text{r}_{H}\cdot\zeta\cdot\text{E}$$

In these equations r_{H} presents the hydrodynamic radius of the colloids, $\nu$ – the speed of electrophoretic migration, $\eta$ – the dynamic viscosity of the solutions, $\varepsilon_{0}$ – dielectric constant in vacuum, $\varepsilon_{r}$ is water’s relative dielectric constant at 298 K, $\zeta$ is the zeta potential, E is the electric field. The hydrodynamic radius is the sum of particles’ radiuses and the stationary solvent interface.

By steady state electrophoretic migration of charged colloids the electrophoretic force and the hydrodynamic resistance force are in equilibrium, described by:

F_{W} + F_{E} = 0

Those effects influence the electrofiltration of biopolymers, which could be also charged, not only by the hydrodynamic resistance force but also by the electric field force. Focusing on the cathode side reveals that the negatively charged particles are affected by the electric field force, which is opposite to the hydrodynamic resistance force. In this manner the formation of filter cake on this side is impeded or in ideal situation filter cake is not formed at all. In this case the electric field is referred as critical electric field E_{crit}. As a result of the equilibrium of those forces, liquids subjected to the influence of electric force become charged. In addition to the applied hydraulic pressure ∆pH the process is influenced also by the electro-osmotic pressure P_{e}.

Modifying the Darcy’s basic equation, describing filter cake formation, with electro-kinetic effects by integration under assumption of using the constants of electro-osmotic pressure P_{e}, the critical electric field E_{krit} and the electric field E results: Previous scientific works conducted in the Dept. of Bioprocess Engineering, Institute of Engineering in Life Sciences, University of Karlsruhe demonstrated that electrofiltration is effective for the concentration of charged biopolymers. Very promising results concerning purification of the charged polysaccharide xanthan are already obtained. Figure 2 represents xanthan filter cake.

== Literature ==
- Vorobiev E., Lebovka N., (2008). Electrotechnologies for Extraction from Food Plants and Biomaterials, ISBN 978-0-387-79373-3.
