= Nuclear energy in Slovenia =

Nuclear power plants in Slovenia (view)
Operational plant

Nuclear energy is used in Slovenia for a number of civilian purposes including electricity production, medicine, and research. In 2025, nuclear power produced 40% of the country’s electricity.

== Nuclear energy regulation ==
As stated in the Slovenian 8th National Report as Referred in Article 5 of the Convention on Nuclear Safety, “[t]he most prominent piece of legislation is the Act on Protection against Ionising Radiation and Nuclear Safety – ZVISJV 1 (Official Gazette of the Republic of Slovenia, No. 76/17 and 26/19; hereinafter referred to as “the 2017 Act”), which entered into force in January 2018. The previous Act was adopted in 2002 and subsequently revised four times. After the adoption of the 2017 Act substantial work was devoted to updating the whole set of secondary legislation (the so-called Rules), which is practically finished, as of May 2019.”

The Slovenian nuclear regulator is the Slovenian Nuclear Safety Administration (SNSA). SNSA is located in a modern office park on the northern edge of the Slovenian capital of Ljubljana at Litostrojska 54, 1000 Ljubljana. As of 2019, the SNSA is part of the Ministry of the Environment and Spatial Planning.

== International relations ==
Slovenia is a signatory to the International Atomic Energy Agency Convention on Nuclear Safety. The Convention seeks to improve transparency and adherence with a “high level of safety by establishing fundamental safety principles to which the States would subscribe.”

Slovenia is also a member of the Nuclear Energy Agency (NEA), an intergovernmental agency that is organized under the Organisation for Economic Co-operation and Development (OECD), and European Atomic Energy Community - commonly known as Euratom.

== Research reactor ==
The Jožef Stefan Institute (IJS) (Slovene: Institut "Jožef Stefan") is the largest research institute in Slovenia. The institute was founded by the State Security Administration (Yugoslavia) in 1949 for atomic weapons research. Today the main research areas are physics, chemistry, molecular biology, biotechnology, information technologies, reactor physics, energy and environment. The institute has facilities in two locations. The main facilities and the headquarters are on Jamova 39 in Ljubljana, the other location is the Institute's Reactor Center Podgorica located in Brinje, Dol pri Ljubljani near Ljubljana.

The institute's Reactor Center Podgorica is home to a pool type research reactor. The General Atomics TRIGA Mark II reactor is rated for a nominal 250 kW thermal. The reactor was first licensed in 1966 and is expected to continue operation at least into the 2030s.

The Central Radioactive Waste Storage of Slovenia is co-located at the Institute's reactor facility. This facility is used for storage of the low and intermediate level solid radioactive waste from the Reactor Center and other, non-Institute small waste producers such as medical, research, and industrial applications of ionising radiation.

== Nuclear power plant ==
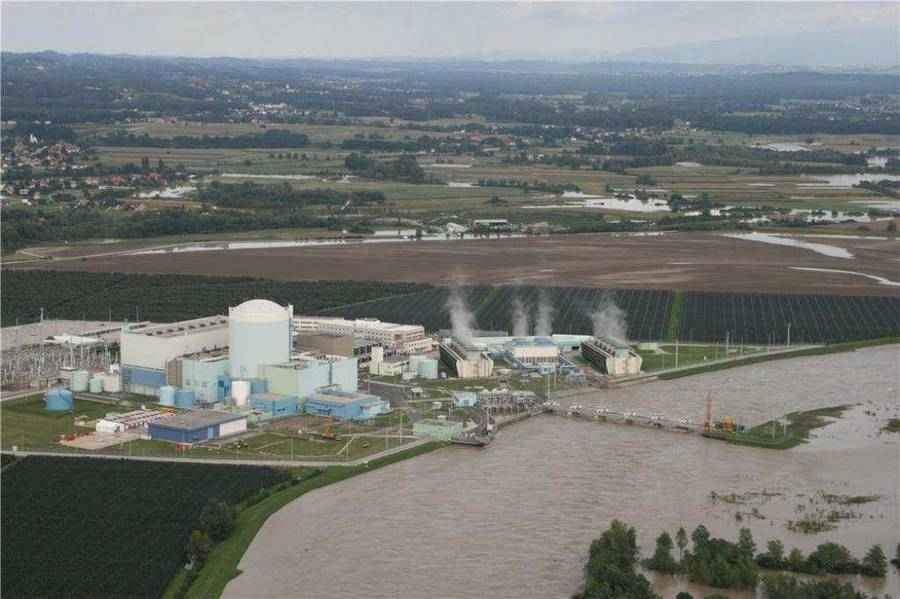
Krško Nuclear Power Plant

Slovenia's only nuclear power plant is the 696 MWe Krško Nuclear Power Plant, located in the eastern part of the country, which went into commercial operation on January 15, 1983. It was built as a joint venture by Slovenia and Croatia which were at the time both part of Yugoslavia. The plant is a Westinghouse Electric Company two loop, light water pressurized water reactor. The operating company Nuklearna Elektrarna Krško (NEK) remains co-owned by Slovenian and Croatian state-owned companies and provides more than one quarter of Slovenia's electrical power along with roughly a fifth of Croatia's.

In 2019, the plant provided 22.3% of Slovenia's total energy supply. The plant provided 36.2% of the total electricity generated in Slovenia in 2019.

The debate on whether and when to close the Krško plant intensified following the 2005-06 winter energy crisis which highlighted Slovenia's exposure to natural gas supply disruptions. Nuclear waste is disposed in storage facilities. Slovenia has left the possibility of reprocessing spent fuel open.

The plant is expected to be operational until 2043, following agreement in 2020 between the Slovenia and Croatia governments.

== Proposed expansion of Krško Nuclear Power Plant ==
The idea of increasing the amount of electricity produced by nuclear power in Slovenia has been explored several times since the Krško nuclear power plant was constructed. As all liquid and gas fossil fuels (e.g. petroleum products and natural gas) for consumption in Slovenia must be imported, Slovenia is seeking greater energy independence, in addition to seeking to be carbon neutral by 2050. GEN Energija also cites nuclear as a means to help ensure affordable, predictable and stable prices of electricity for Slovenia as motivations for another reactor at the Krško site.

GEN Energija described planning efforts for a second Krško unit, JEK 2, on their website as early as 2015. The parent company of the Slovenian owner of the plant, GEN Skupina, published a video in mid-2019 depicting a single new large reactor at the Krško site, to the west of the current reactor. Additionally, it was announced that GEN filed a request for a second reactor at Krško and was looking for Slovenian partners for the project. In the early 2020s, the Ministry of Infrastructure included the start of construction of an addition to the Krško nuclear power plant by the late 2020s in its plans, though no decision on reactor technology or final decision to proceed has been made. Croatia's government has also expressed interest in an expansion of the Krško nuclear power plant, in addition to the announced life extension of the operating Krško reactor to 2043.

In December 2020, Slovenia and the United States signed a Memorandum of Understanding Concerning Strategic Civil Nuclear Cooperation intended to improve cooperation on energy security and strengthens the diplomatic and economic relationship between the two countries. The MOU was viewed as a reinforcement of the Slovenian-US ties in nuclear power which extend back to the start of construction of the US company Westinghouse-designed Krško nuclear power plant in 1975; observers noted that US technology would be considered for any nuclear expansion plans in Slovenia.

=== Potential reactor designs ===
Based the GEN energij statement regarding the desired annual electrical generation of the new plant to be approximately 8.8 TWh, reactors with net electrical capacities of approximately 1,100 MWe would be considered. GEN energija mentioned following technologies to be considered for JEK 2 in 2021:

- Westinghouse AP1000
- Korea Electric Power Corporation APR1000
- China General Nuclear Power Group (CGN) and China National Nuclear Corporation (CNNC) HPR1000
- OKB Gidropress VVER1200
