= 4th Mountain Artillery Regiment (Italy) =

Inactive Italian Army mountain artillery unit

- 4° Reggimento Artiglieria da Montagna
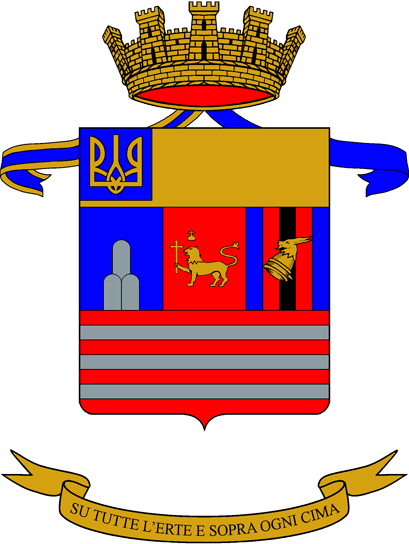
- Regimental coat of arms
- Active: 1 Jan. 1934 – 10 Sept. 1943; 1 Oct. 1975 – 23 March 1991
- Country: Italy
- Branch: Italian Army
- Part of: Alpine Brigade "Taurinense"
- Garrison/HQ: Susa
- Motto(s): "Su tutte l'erte e sopra ogni cima"
- Anniversaries: 15 June 1918 – Second Battle of the Piave River
- Decorations: 1× Gold Medal of Military Valor; 1× Bronze Medal of Military Valor

Insignia
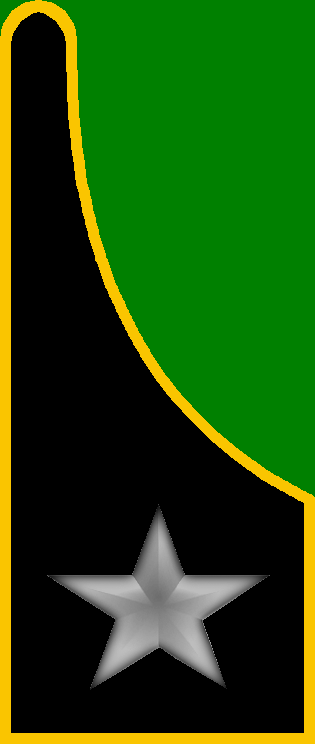
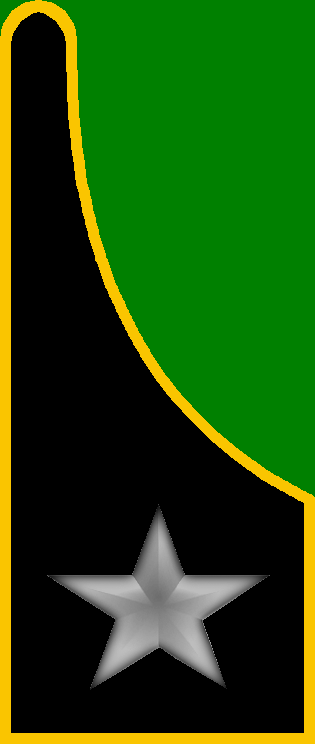
- Regimental gorget patches

The 4th Mountain Artillery Regiment (Italian: 4° Reggimento Artiglieria da Montagna) is an inactive mountain artillery regiment of the Italian Army, which was based in Susa in Piedmont. The regiment was formed in 1934 by the Royal Italian Army with mountain artillery groups that had served in World War I. The regiment was assigned to the 4th Alpine Division "Cuneense", with which it served during World War II in the invasion of France and the Greco-Italian War. In summer 1942 the division was transferred to the Soviet Union, where it was destroyed in winter 1942–43 during the Soviet Operation Little Saturn. The remnants of the division were repatriated in spring 1943 and invading German forces disbanded the division and its regiments after the announcement of the Armistice of Cassibile on 8 September 1943.

In 1975 the 1st Mountain Artillery Regiment was split into two mountain artillery groups and the flag and traditions of the 4th Mountain Artillery Regiment were assigned to the Mountain Artillery Group "Pinerolo". The group was assigned to the Alpine Brigade "Taurinense" until 1991, when the group was disbanded and the flag of the 4th Mountain Artillery Regiment transferred to the Shrine of the Flags in the Vittoriano in Rome. The Italian mountain artillery has served since its inception alongside the infantry's Alpini speciality, with whom the mountain artillery shares the distinctive Cappello Alpino. The regimental anniversary falls, as for all Italian Army artillery regiments, on June 15, the beginning of the Second Battle of the Piave River in 1918.

== History ==
On 1 January 1934 the 4th Mountain Artillery Regiment was formed in Cuneo. The regiment was assigned, together with the 1st Alpini Regiment and 2nd Alpini Regiment, to the IV Alpine Brigade. The regiment consisted of a command, a command unit, the Mountain Artillery Group "Pinerolo", with the batteries 7th, 8th, and 9th, and the Mountain Artillery Group "Mondovì", with the batteries 10th, 11th, and 12th. The two groups had been ceded by the 1st Mountain Artillery Regiment, which had formed the Group "Pinerolo" in 1887 as III Mountain Brigade and the Group "Mondovì" in 1895 as IV Mountain Brigade. In 1911–12 the Group "Mondovì" was deployed to Libya for the Italo-Turkish War, and both groups fought in World War I on the Italian front.

On 27 October 1934 the IV Alpine Brigade changed its name to IV Superior Alpine Command, which received the name "Cuneense" in December. Consequently the regiment was renamed in January 1935 4th Alpine Artillery Regiment "Cuneense". On 31 October 1935 the IV Superior Alpine Command "Cuneense" was reorganized as 4th Alpine Division "Cuneense". On 24 December 1935 the regiment mobilized the 11th Battery of the Group "Mondovì" for the Second Italo-Ethiopian War. The battery was assigned to the newly formed Alpine Artillery Group "Belluno", which was assigned on 31 December 1935 to the newly formed the 5th Alpine Artillery Regiment "Pusteria" of the 5th Alpine Division "Pusteria". After the war in Ethiopia the battery returned to the regiment on 14 April 1937. In August 1939 the regiment formed the Alpine Artillery Group "Val Tanaro", with the batteries 25th, 26th, and 27th, and the Alpine Artillery Group "Val Po", with the batteries 72nd, 73rd, and 74th.

=== World War II ===
On 10 June 1940, the day Italy entered World War II, the regiment consisted of a command, command unit, the Alpine Artillery Group "Pinerolo", and the Alpine Artillery Group "Mondovì", as the regiment's "Val Tanaro" and "Val Po" groups had been ceded to the 6th Alpini Group, respectively to the 5th Alpini Group on 1 June 1940. All four groups were equipped with 75/13 mod. 15 mountain guns. In June 1940 the regiment participated in the invasion of France and in November of the same year the 4th Alpine Division "Cuneense" was transferred to Albania to shore up the crumbling Italian front during the Greco-Italian War. On 15 December 1940 the division entered combat and until 18 March 1941, when the division was taken out of the front in preparation for the Invasion of Yugoslavia, the division was in constant combat with Greek Army units. On 10 April the division crossed into Macedonia and advanced to Debar. After the war's conclusion the division returned to Italy in May 1941. For its conduct and bravery on the Greek front the regiment was awarded a Bronze Medal of Military Valor, which was affixed to the regiment's flag and is depicted on the regiment's coat of arms.

In spring 1942 the 4th Alpine Division "Cuneense" was assigned, together with the 2nd Alpine Division "Tridentina" and 3rd Alpine Division "Julia", to the Italian 8th Army, which was sent in summer 1942 to the Eastern Front. In preparation for the deployment to the Soviet Union the Alpine Artillery Group "Val Po", with the 72nd and 73rd batteries, returned to the regiment. The Group "Val Po" was equipped with 105/11 mod. 28 mountain guns. The regiment also received the 64th and 116th anti-aircraft batteries with 20/65 mod. 35 anti-aircraft guns from the depot of the 3rd Artillery Regiment "Pistoia", and after arriving in the Soviet Union the regiment received in September 1942 the 78th Anti-tank Battery with Pak 97/38 anti-tank guns. During its time in the Soviet Union the regiment consisted of the following units:

- 4th Alpine Artillery Regiment "Cuneense"
  - Command Unit
  - Alpine Artillery Group "Pinerolo"
    - Command Unit
    - 7th Battery, with 4× 75/13 mod. 15 mountain guns
    - 8th Battery, with 4× 75/13 mod. 15 mountain guns
    - 9th Battery, with 4× 75/13 mod. 15 mountain guns
    - Ammunition and Supply Unit
  - Alpine Artillery Group "Mondovì"
    - Command Unit
    - 10th Battery, with 4× 75/13 mod. 15 mountain guns
    - 11th Battery, with 4× 75/13 mod. 15 mountain guns
    - 12th Battery, with 4× 75/13 mod. 15 mountain guns
    - Ammunition and Supply Unit
  - Alpine Artillery Group "Val Po"
    - Command Unit
    - 72nd Battery, with 4× 105/11 mod. 28 mountain guns
    - 73rd Battery, with 4× 105/11 mod. 28 mountain guns
    - Ammunition and Supply Unit
  - 64th Anti-aircraft Battery, with 8× 20/65 mod. 35 anti-aircraft guns
  - 78th Anti-tank Battery, with 6× Pak 97/38 anti-tank guns
  - 116th Battery, with 8× 20/65 mod. 35 anti-aircraft guns

The groups "Pinerlo" and "Mondovì" fielded 1,296 men (32 officers, 32 non-commissioned officers, and 1,232 soldiers), which operated twelve 75/13 mod. 15 mountain guns. Being an alpine unit the group's main mode of transport were mules, of which the group had 720.

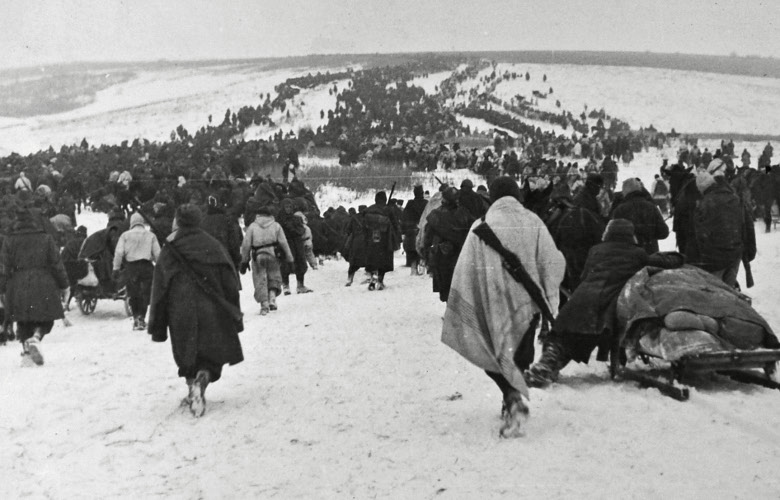
The retreat of the Italian 8th Army towards Nikolayevka

In July 1942 the three alpine division, grouped together in the Alpine Army Corps, arrived in Eastern Ukraine, from where they marched eastwards towards the Don river. The Italian 8th Army covered the left flank of the German 6th Army, which spearheaded the German summer offensive of 1942 towards Stalingrad. On 12 December 1942 the Red Army commenced Operation Little Saturn, which, in its first stage, attacked and encircled the Italian II Army Corps and XXXV Army Corps, to the southeast of the Alpine Army Corps. On 13 January 1943, the Red Army launched the second stage of Operation Little Saturn with the Voronezh Front encircling and destroying the Hungarian Second Army to the northwest of the Alpine Army Corps.

On the evening of 17 January 1943, the Alpine Army Corps commander, General Gabriele Nasci, ordered a full retreat. At this point only the 2nd Alpine Division "Tridentina" was still capable of conducting combat operations. The 40,000-strong mass of stragglers — Alpini and Italians from other commands, plus German and Hungarians — followed the "Tridentina", which led the way westwards to the Axis lines. As the Soviets had already occupied every village, bitter battles had to be fought to clear the way. By morning of 28 January the Cuneense had walked 200 km, fought 20 battles, lost 80% of its men and spent 11 nights camped out in the middle of the Russian Steppe. Temperatures during the nights were between −30 °C and −40 °C. On 28 January the last remnants of the division were overrun by Cossack forces. The last survivors of the 1st Alpini Regiment burned the regiment's flag to prevent it from falling into enemy hands. The Cuneense then ceased to exist.

On 11 February 1943 a count of the survivors showed that of the 3,616 men of the 4th Alpine Artillery Regiment "Cuneense" only 379 had survived Operation Little Saturn. No one from the Alpine Artillery Group "Mondovì" had survived and overall a mere 1,607 men of the division's 17,460 troops survived. For its bravery and sacrifice in the Soviet Union the regiment was awarded a Gold Medal of Military Valor, which was affixed to the regiment's flag and is depicted on the regiment's coat of arms. The regiment was still in the process of being rebuilt, when it was disbanded by invading German forces two days after the announcement of the Armistice of Cassibile on 8 September 1943.

=== Cold War ===
On 1 May 1952 the 1st Mountain Artillery Regiment was reformed in Rivoli and was assigned to the Alpine Brigade "Taurinense". The regiment consisted of a command, a command unit, the Mountain Artillery Group "Aosta" with 75/13 mod. 15 mountain guns in Saluzzo, the Mountain Artillery Group "Susa" with 100/17 mod. 14 howitzers in Susa, the Mountain Artillery Group "Pinerolo" with M30 107mm mortars in Susa, and a light anti-aircraft group with 40/56 anti-aircraft autocannons in Rivoli. Initially only the Group "Aosta" consisted of batteries with traditional mountain battery numbers, but on 15 March 1955 the army's General Staff ordered that also the groups with 100/17 mod. 14 howitzers and M30 107mm mortars should receive traditional mountain battery numbers. Consequently all the batteries of the regiment were renumbered and afterwards the Group "Pinerolo" fielded once again its traditional three batteries. On 1 April 1958 the Group "Pinerolo" was equipped with Brandt AM-50 120mm mortars. In 1960 the regiment received 105/14 mod. 56 pack howitzers and each of the regiment's three groups now fielded two howitzer and one mortar battery.

During the Cold War the Alpine Brigade "Julia" was tasked with defending the Canal Valley, which was considered to be the most likely invasion route for a Warsaw Pact attack on Italy. To augment the Alpine Brigade "Julia" the Group "Pinerolo" moved on 1 December 1963 from Susa to Tolmezzo, where it was assigned to 3rd Mountain Artillery Regiment. Although now stationed in Friuli-Venezia Giulia the group retained its traditional recruiting area in Piedmont. As replacement the 1st Mountain Artillery Regiment reformed on 1 January 1965 the Group "Mondovì" in Susa as a reserve formation. On 15 April 1970 the Mountain Artillery Group "Mondovì" became an active unit with the batteries 10th, 11th, and 12th. In 1970 all the mountain groups' mortar batteries were equipped with 105/14 mod. 56 pack howitzers. On 31 December 1974 the Group "Pinerolo" was placed in reserve status.

During the 1975 army reform the army disbanded the regimental level and newly independent battalions and groups were granted for the first time their own flags. On 1 June 1975 the Mountain Artillery Group "Pinerolo" was disbanded, followed by the Mountain Artillery Group "Mondovì" on 10 September. On 1 October the Mountain Artillery Group "Susa" in Susa and the Mountain Artillery Group "Aosta" in Saluzzo became autonomous units. On 18 October 1975 the 1st Mountain Artillery Regiment was disbanded and the next day the two groups were assigned to the Alpine Brigade "Taurinense". Both groups consisted of a command, a command and services battery, and three batteries with 105/14 mod. 56 pack howitzers, with one of the batteries being mule-carried. At the time each of the two groups fielded 610 men (35 officers, 55 non-commissioned officers, and 520 soldiers).

On 12 November 1976 the President of the Italian Republic Giovanni Leone issued decree 846, which assigned the flag and traditions of the 1st Mountain Artillery Regiment to the Mountain Artillery Group "Aosta" and the flag and traditions of the 4th Mountain Artillery Regiment to the Mountain Artillery Group "Pinerolo". On 15 June 1976 the Mountain Artillery Group "Pinerolo" renumbered the batteries it had inherited from the Group "Susa" and then consisted of the batteries 7th, 8th, and 40th, which were all equipped with 105/14 mod. 56 pack howitzers, with the 7th Battery being mule-carried. In 1987 the group formed a Self-defense Anti-aircraft Battery, which was equipped with Stinger man-portable air-defense systems.

=== Recent times ===
After the end of the Cold War the Italian Army began to draw down its forces. On 23 March 1991 the 7th Battery, 8th Battery and the Command and Services Battery of the Mountain Artillery Group "Pinerolo" were disbanded, while the 40th Battery and the Self-defense Anti-aircraft Battery were transferred to the Mountain Artillery Group "Aosta". On 10 April October of the same year the flag of the 4th Mountain Artillery Regiment was transferred to the Shrine of the Flags in the Vittoriano in Rome.
