= 5th Alpine Division "Pusteria" =

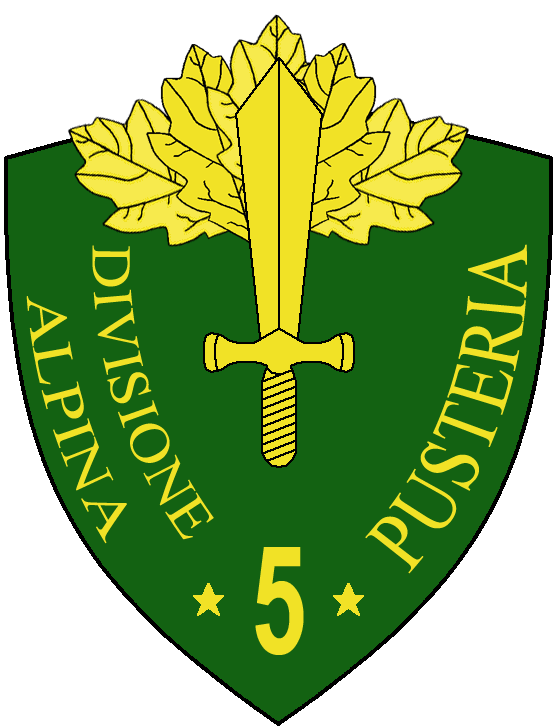
- 5th Alpine Division "Pusteria" insignia
- Active: 31 December 1935 – 8 September 1943
- Country: Kingdom of Italy
- Branch: Royal Italian Army
- Type: Alpini
- Role: Mountain Infantry
- Size: 17,460 men
- Garrison/HQ: Bruneck
- Engagements: Second Italo-Ethiopian War; World War II; Battle of France; Greco-Italian War

Commanders
- Notable commanders: Giovanni Esposito

Insignia
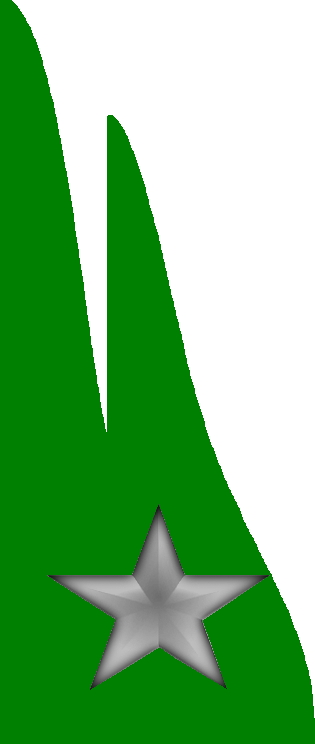
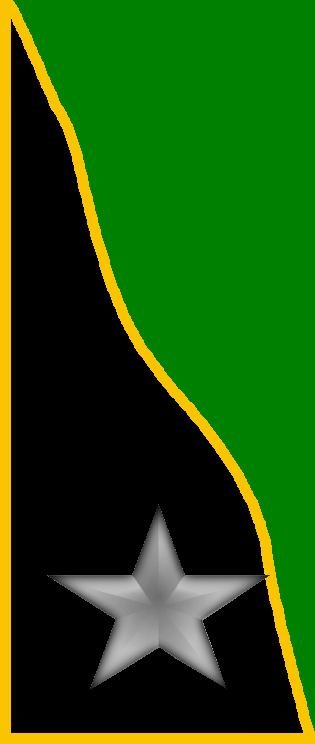
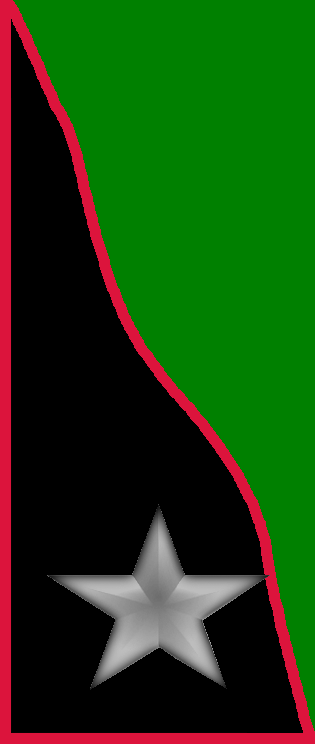
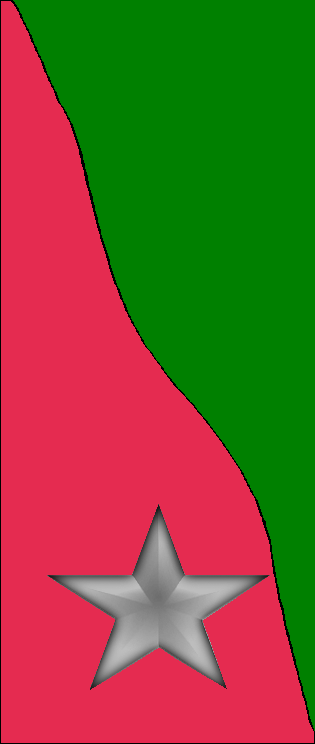
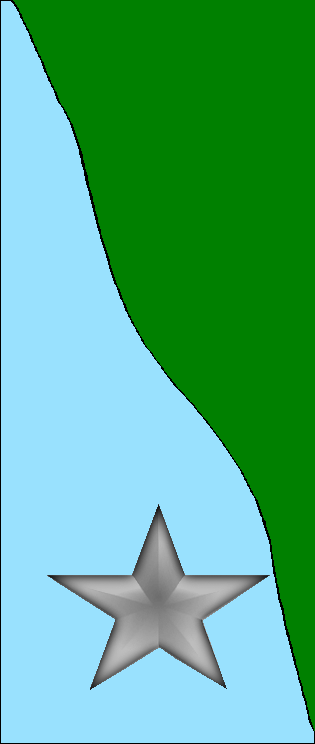
- Identification symbol: Pusteria Division gorget patches

The 5th Alpine Division "Pusteria" (Italian: 5ª Divisione alpina "Pusteria") was a division of the Royal Italian Army during World War II, which specialized in mountain warfare. The Alpini are a mountain infantry corps of the Italian Army, that distinguished itself in combat during World War I and World War II. The division was formed in 1935 and based in the Puster Valley (Italian: Val Pusteria), which gave the division its name.

== History ==
=== Formation ===
The division was activated on 31 December 1935 with units of the other four alpine divisions. The division was meant as a temporary command for the Second Italo-Ethiopian War.

- 7th Alpini Regiment, from the 3rd Alpine Division "Julia"
  - Alpini Battalion "Feltre"
  - Alpini Battalion "Pieve di Teco", from the 1st Alpini Regiment/ 4th Alpine Division "Cuneense"
  - Alpini Battalion "Exilles", from the 3rd Alpini Regiment/ 1st Alpine Division "Taurinense"
- 11th Alpini Regiment, newly raised on 22 December 1935
  - Alpini Battalion "Saluzzo", from the 2nd Alpini Regiment/ 4th Alpine Division "Cuneense"
  - Alpini Battalion "Intra", from the 4th Alpini Regiment/ 1st Alpine Division "Taurinense"
  - Alpini Battalion "Trento", from the 6th Alpini Regiment/ 2nd Alpine Division "Tridentina"
- 5th Alpine Artillery Regiment, newly raised on 31 December 1935
  - Alpine Artillery Group "Belluno", from the 3rd Alpine Artillery Regiment/ 3rd Alpine Division "Julia"
    - 1st Battery, from the Alpine Artillery Group "Susa"/ 1st Alpine Artillery Regiment/ 1st Alpine Division "Taurinense"
    - 11th Battery, from the Alpine Artillery Group "Mondovì"/ 4th Alpine Artillery Regiment/ 4th Alpine Division "Cuneense"
    - 24th Battery
  - Alpine Artillery Group "Lanzo", newly raised by the 1st Alpine Artillery Regiment/ 1st Alpine Division "Taurinense"
    - 5th Battery, from the Alpine Artillery Group "Aosta"/ 1st Alpine Artillery Regiment/ 1st Alpine Division "Taurinense"
    - 13th Battery, from the Alpine Artillery Group "Conegliano"/ 3rd Alpine Artillery Regiment/ 3rd Alpine Division "Julia"
    - 21st Battery, from the Alpine Artillery Group "Vicenza"/ 2nd Alpine Artillery Regiment/ 2nd Alpine Division "Tridentina"
- 5th Alpine Engineer Company
- VII Replacements Battalion
- XI Replacements Battalion

=== Second Italo-Ethiopian War ===
The Pusteria embarked in Livorno and Naples from 6 January 1936 for its transfer to Massawa in Italian Eritrea. From there the division moved to Macallé in Ethiopia and entered combat at the end of January. The division played a primary role in the Battle of Amba Aradam and the Battle of Maychew, and participated in the Second Battle of Tembien. On 5 May 1936 the division entered the Ethiopian capital of Addis Ababa. After the war's conclusions the division remained in Ethiopia until April 1937 to eliminate the remaining Ethiopian resistance. The division arrived back in Naples on 12 April 1937 and was given a triumph march through Rome the next day. Having distinguished itself in Ethiopia it was decided that the division would not be disbanded.

The division moved the Bruneck and was assigned in May 1937 the following units:

- 7th Alpini Regiment, in Belluno, with its traditional three battalions
  - Alpini Battalion "Belluno"
  - Alpini Battalion "Feltre"
  - Alpini Battalion "Pieve di Cadore"
- 11th Alpini Regiment, in Bruneck
  - Alpini Battalion "Bassano", from the 9th Alpini Regiment/ 3rd Alpine Division "Julia"
  - Alpini Battalion "Trento"
  - Alpini Battalion "Bolzano", newly raised
- 5th Alpine Artillery Regiment, in Belluno
  - Alpine Artillery Group "Belluno"
  - Alpine Artillery Group "Lanzo"
  - V Mixed Alpine Engineer Regiment

=== World War II ===
==== Invasion of France ====
On 21 June 1940 the Pusteria began to advance into southern France with other Italian units during the last days of the Battle of France.

==== Greco-Italian War ====
In late November 1940 the division was sent as reinforcements to Albania for the Greco-Italian War. Between 6 December 1940 and 28 January 1941 the division was in constant combat with Greek Army forces, which tried to advance to Berat. From 12 April the division participated in the Battle of Greece.

==== Yugoslav-Italian war ====
After the invasion of Yugoslavia the Pusteria was sent to Pljevlja in Montenegro. On 1 December 1941 the division was attacked by Yugoslav Partisan of the People's Liberation Movement of Yugoslavia. The Battle of Pljevlja was the first organized attack on occupation forces.

==== Case Anton ====
In August 1942, the division was repatriated and after two months of rest participated in Case Anton, the Axis occupation of Vichy France. Afterwards the Pusteria took up garrison duties in Grenoble, Chambery, Gap, and Digne-les-Bains.

After the announcement of the Armistice of Cassibile on 8 September 1943, part of the division surrendered to German forces in Southern France while other units managed to return to the Italian region of Piedmont where they disbanded.

== Organization ==
5th Alpine Division "Pusteria" organization in 1940

During World War II the division consisted of the following units:

- 5th Alpine Division "Pusteria", in Bruneck
  - Headquarters
    - Command Company
    - 2 × Carabinieri sections
    - 206th Field Post Office
    - 5th Alpine Division Command Transport Squad
  - 7th Alpini Regiment, in Belluno
    - Command Company
    - Alpini Battalion "Feltre"
      - Command Company
      - 64th, 65th, and 66th Alpini companies
      - 95th Support Weapons Company (Breda M37 machine guns, 45mm mod. 35 and 81mm mod. 35 mortars)
    - Alpini Battalion "Pieve di Cadore"
      - Command Company
      - 67th, 68th, and 75th Alpini companies
      - 96th Support Weapons Company (Breda M37 machine guns, 45mm mod. 35 and 81mm mod. 35 mortars)
    - Alpini Battalion "Belluno"
      - Command Company
      - 77th, 78th, and 79th Alpini companies
      - 106th Support Weapons Company (Breda M37 machine guns, 45mm mod. 35 and 81mm mod. 35 mortars)
    - 7th Supply Section
    - 27th Train Section (equipped with mules)
    - 307th Medical Section (includes the 624th Field Hospital)
  - 11th Alpini Regiment, in Bruneck
    - Command Company
    - Alpini Battalion "Bassano"
      - Command Company
      - 62nd, 63rd, and 74th Alpini companies
      - 127th Support Weapons Company (Breda M37 machine guns, 45mm mod. 35 and 81mm mod. 35 mortars)
    - Alpini Battalion "Trento"
      - Command Company
      - 94th, 144th, and 145th Alpini companies
      - 128th Support Weapons Company (Breda M37 machine guns, 45mm mod. 35 and 81mm mod. 35 mortars)
    - Alpini Battalion "Bolzano"
      - Command Company
      - 92nd, 141st, and 142nd Alpini companies
      - 129th Support Weapons Company (Breda M37 machine guns, 45mm mod. 35 and 81mm mod. 35 mortars)
    - 11th Supply Section
    - 211th Train Section (equipped with mules)
    - 311th Medical Section (includes the 625th Field Hospital)
  - 5th Alpine Artillery Regiment, in Belluno
    - Command Unit
    - Alpine Artillery Group "Lanzo" (75/13 mod. 15 mountain guns)
      - 16th Battery
      - 21st Battery
      - 44th Battery
    - Alpine Artillery Group "Belluno" (75/13 mod. 15 mountain guns)
      - 22nd Battery
      - 23rd Battery
      - 24th Battery
    - Ammunition and Supply Unit
  - V Mixed Alpine Engineer Battalion
    - Command Platoon
    - 105th Searchlight Section
    - 115th Telegraph and Radio Operators Company
    - 125th Engineer Company
  - 208th Mixed Transport Unit
  - 304th Medical Section (includes 4 × field hospitals)
  - 11th Supply Section

Attached during operations in Montenegro:

- 1st Alpini Valley Group (from the 6th Alpine Division "Alpi Graie")
- X CC.NN. Battalion
- CVI Guardia alla Frontiera Machine Gun Battalion

Attached in France:

- 20th Alpini Skiers Grouping (3rd Alpini Valley Group command staff, from the 6th Alpine Division "Alpi Graie")
  - Alpini Skiers Battalion "Monte Cervino"
  - Alpini Skiers Battalion "Monte Rosa"
  - Alpini Skiers Battalion "Moncenisio"
  - Alpine Artillery Group "Val d'Orco"

== Commanding officers ==
The division's commanding officers were:

- Generale di Divisione Luigi Negri Cesi (31 December 1935 - May 1937)
- Generale di Brigata Vincenzo Paolini (May 1937 - 31 August 1938)
- Generale di Brigata Amedeo De Cia (1 September 1938 - 13 January 1941)
- Generale di Divisione Giovanni Esposito (14 January 1941 - 30 September 1942)
- Generale di Divisione Maurizio Lazzaro De Castiglioni (1 October 1942 - 9 September 1943)

== CROWCASS ==
The names of two men attached to the division can be found in the Central Registry of War Criminals and Security Suspects (CROWCASS) set up by the Anglo-American Supreme Headquarters Allied Expeditionary Force in 1945. The names can be found at: Central Registry of War Criminals and Security Suspects from the Kingdom of Italy.
