= 3rd Field Artillery Regiment (Mountain) =

Active Italian Army mountain artillery unit

- 3° Reggimento Artiglieria Terrestre (montagna)
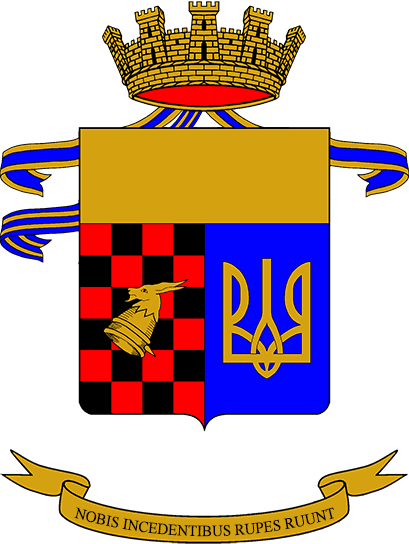
- Regimental coat of arms
- Active: 15 July 1909 – 12 Sept. 1943; 1 Feb. 1951 – today
- Country: Italy
- Branch: Italian Army
- Part of: Alpine Brigade "Julia"
- Garrison/HQ: Remanzacco
- Motto: "Nobis incedentibus rupes ruunt"
- Anniversaries: 15 June 1918 – Second Battle of the Piave River
- Decorations: 2× Gold Medals of Military Valor; 1× Silver Medal of Army Valor; 1× Silver Cross of Army Merit

Insignia
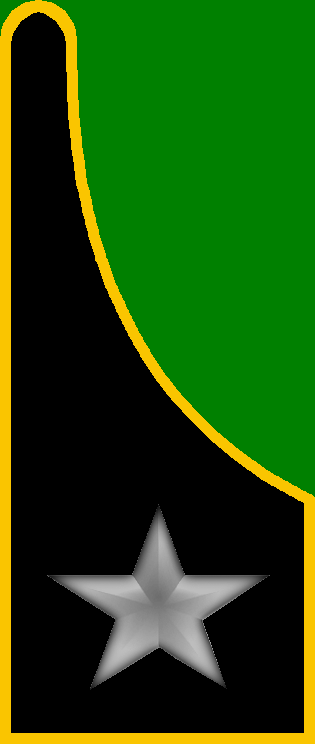
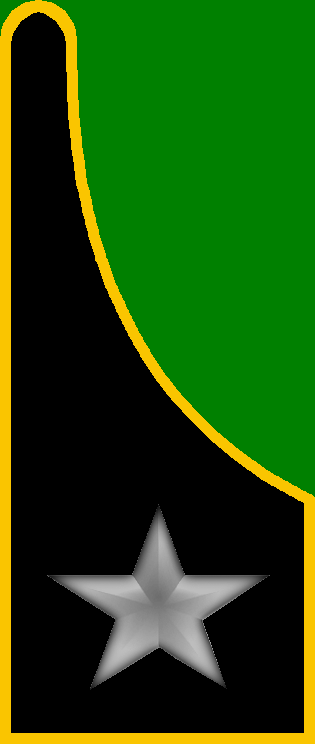
- Regimental gorget patches

Regimental mountaineering course in the Dolomites

The 3rd Field Artillery Regiment (Mountain) (Italian: 3° Reggimento Artiglieria Terrestre (montagna)) is a field artillery regiment of the Italian Army, specializing in mountain warfare. The regiment is based in Remanzacco in Friuli-Venezia Giulia and assigned to the Alpine Brigade "Julia". The regiment was formed in 1909 by the Royal Italian Army as 2nd Mountain Artillery Regiment. In World War I the regiment's groups and batteries served on the Italian front.

In 1926 the 2nd Mountain Artillery Regiment switched numbers with the then 3rd Mountain Artillery Regiment, but retained its flag, traditions, and place as the second oldest Italian mountain artillery regiment. In 1935 the regiment was assigned to the 3rd Alpine Division "Julia", with which it served during World War II in the invasion of France and the Greco-Italian War. In summer 1942 the division was transferred to the Soviet Union, where it was destroyed in winter 1942–43 during the Soviet Operation Little Saturn. The remnants of the division were repatriated in spring 1943 and invading German forces disbanded the division and its regiments after the announcement of the Armistice of Cassibile on 8 September 1943.

The regiment was reformed in 1951 and assigned to the Alpine Brigade "Julia". In 1975 the regiment was split into three mountain artillery groups and its flag and traditions were assigned to the Mountain Artillery Group "Conegliano". In 1992 the regiment was reformed. The regiment is the highest decorated artillery unit of the Italian Army, having been awarded two Gold Medals of Military Valor in World War II: the first for the regiment's conduct during the Greco-Italian War, and the second for its service with the Italian Army in Russia. The Italian mountain artillery has served since its inception alongside the infantry's Alpini speciality, with whom the mountain artillery shares the distinctive Cappello Alpino. The regimental anniversary falls, as for all Italian Army artillery regiments, on June 15, the beginning of the Second Battle of the Piave River in 1918.

== History ==
On 1 January 1883 the 16th Fortress Regiment in Mantua formed the 1st Mountain Brigade, while the 14th Fortress Regiment in Genoa formed the 2nd Mountain Brigade. The 1st Mountain Brigade consisted of the 1st Mountain Battery, which had been ceded by the 11th Fortress Regiment, the 2nd and 3rd mountain batteries, which had been ceded by the 12th Fortress Regiment, and the 4th Mountain Battery, which was formed with elements of the other three batteries. The 1st Mountain Brigade was based in Vicenza and its eight batteries were equipped with the 7 BR Ret. Mont. mountain guns.

On 1 November 1887 the 14th Fortress Regiment and 16th Fortress Regiment ceded the two mountain brigades to help form the Mountain Artillery Regiment in Turin. The regiment consisted of a staff, and three brigades, with the 1st Brigade being based in Conegliano. On 1 May 1895 the 5th Field Artillery Regiment transferred its six mountain batteries to the Mountain Artillery Regiment, which proceeded to form five brigades and the brigade in Conegliano was renumbered as V Brigade.

Like the infantry's Alpini battalions, the mountain artillery brigades recruited from the military districts located in the Alps. In 1882 the Alpini battalions were named for the cities, where the administrations of the military districts were located, from which the battalions recruited their troops. Likewise in 1901 the mountain artillery brigades were given the names of the location of their depot, respectively in the case of the brigades based in Turin, from where they recruited their troops. Afterwards the Mountain Artillery Regiment consisted of the I Brigade "Oneglia", II Brigade "Mondovì", III Brigade "Torino-Susa", IV Brigade "Torino-Aosta", and V Brigade "Conegliano". On 21 August 1902 the regiment's V Brigade "Conegliano" in Conegliano became an autonomous unit as and was renamed Mountain Artillery Brigade of Veneto.

In 1904 the batteries began to replace their 7 BR Ret. Mont. mountain guns with 70A mountain guns. On 15 July 1909 the Mountain Artillery Brigade of Veneto was disbanded and the brigade's three batteries, together with six newly formed batteries, formed the 2nd Mountain Artillery Regiment in Vicenza. The regiment consisted of three brigades, which were based in Conegliano, Bergamo, and Vicenza. On the same day the Mountain Artillery Regiment was renamed 1st Mountain Artillery Regiment. On 1 October 1909 the 2nd Mountain Artillery Regiment formed a fourth brigade in Belluno and on 17 July 1910 the brigades of the two mountain artillery regiments were redesignated as mountain artillery groups and dropped their numbers. Afterwards the 2nd Mountain Artillery Regiment consisted of the following units:

- 2nd Mountain Artillery Regiment, in Vicenza
  - Mountain Artillery Group "Conegliano", in Conegliano
    - 13th, 14th, and 15th batteries
  - Mountain Artillery Group "Bergamo", in Bergamo
    - 16th, 17th, and 18th batteries
  - Mountain Artillery Group "Vicenza", in Vicenza
    - 19th, 20th, and 21st batteries
  - Mountain Artillery Group "Belluno", in Belluno
    - 22nd, 23rd, and 24th batteries
  - Regimental depot, in Vicenza

During the Italo-Turkish War in 1911–12 the regiment sent the Group "Vicenza", with the batteries 19th and 23rd, as well as the batteries 15th and 20th to Libya. In May 1912 the 15th and 23rd batteries participated in the Italian operation to seize the island of Rhodes. In 1913 the batteries received 65/17 mod. 13 mountain guns.

=== World War I ===
On 1 February 1915 the regiment ceded the Group "Bergamo" to help form the 3rd Mountain Artillery Regiment. The 2nd Mountain Artillery Regiment retained the numbers of the batteries of the Group "Bergamo" (16th, 17th, 18th) and assigned them to the batteries of the newly formed Group "Udine" in Udine. At the outbreak of World War I the regiment formed the 55th, 57th, and 58th batteries and entered the war with the organization depicted in the following table:

2nd Mountain Artillery Regiment, in Vicenza
Depot in Conegliano	Depot in Udine	Depot in Vicenza	Depot in Belluno
(V) Mountain Artillery Group "Conegliano": 13th Mountain Artillery Battery; 14th Mountain Artillery Battery; 15th Mountain Artillery Battery; 55th Mountain Artillery Battery	(VI) Mountain Artillery Group "Udine": 16th Mountain Artillery Battery; 17th Mountain Artillery Battery; 18th Mountain Artillery Battery; ^{Note 2}	(VII) Mountain Artillery Group "Vicenza": 19th Mountain Artillery Battery; 20th Mountain Artillery Battery; 21st Mountain Artillery Battery; 57th Mountain Artillery Battery	(VIII) Mountain Artillery Group "Belluno": 22nd Mountain Artillery Battery; 23rd Mountain Artillery Battery; 24th Mountain Artillery Battery; 58th Mountain Artillery Battery

Note 2: The "Udine" group's 56th Mountain Artillery Battery was not raised until November 1916 for lack of available 65/17 mod. 13 cannons.

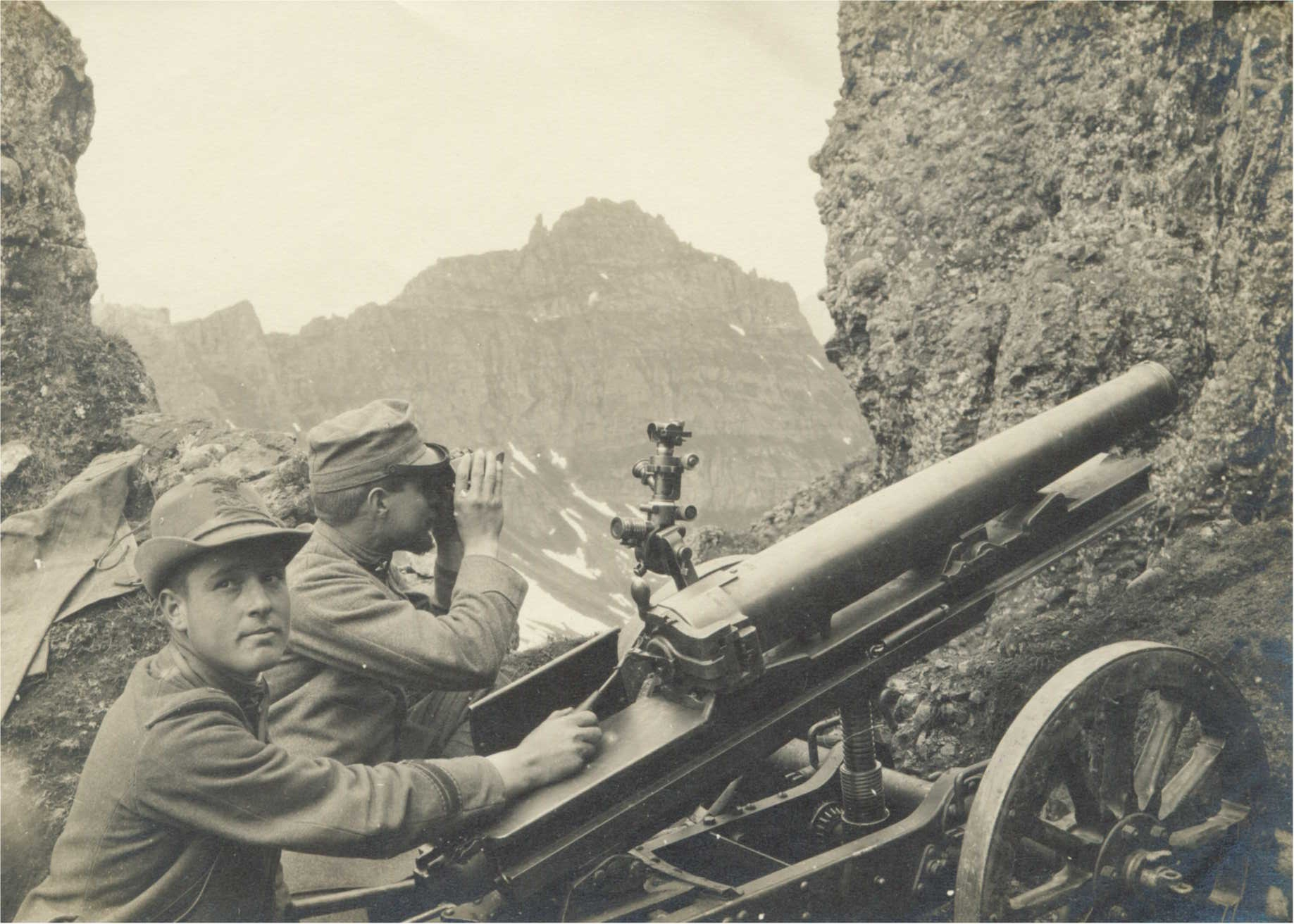
Italian mountain artillery troops firing with a 65/17 mod. 13 mountain gun from Monte Padon towards Austro-Hungarian positions on the Sass di Mezdi

During the war the regiment's depots formed the commands of the 6th and 8th mountain artillery groupings and the commands of 13 mountain artillery groups: XVI (69th, 70th, 71st batteries), XXI (78th, 79th, 80th, 81st batteries), XXIII (50th, 53rd batteries), XXVI (85th, 86th, 87th batteries), XXVIII, XXX (94th, 95th, 96th batteries), XLIX, LIII, LIV, LXI, LXIII, LXIV, and LXVII. The regiment's depots also formed 35 mountain artillery batteries, five commands of siege groups and 21 siege batteries.

During the war the regiment was broken up and its groups and batteries attached to different Alpini units. The Mountain Artillery Group "Conegliano" fought in 1915 and 1916 on the Pal Grande and on Pal Piccolo, as well as on the Freikofel and the Zellonkofel. In 1917 the group fought on Monte Kuk, on Monte Vodice, and the Banjšice plateau. In 1918 the group was in combat on Montello and then in the area of Sernaglia. In 1919 the group was deployed to Italian Libya to help subdue the local population.

The Mountain Artillery Group "Udine" was deployed in 1915 at Tolmin and fought for control of the hills of Bučenica and Mengore. In 1916 the group was initially on Sabotin, but sent in May 1916 to Monte Cengio on the Asiago plateau during the Battle of Asiago. Afterwards the group was on Monte Novegno and then deployed to the Veliki Hribach. In 1917 the group fought at Kostanjevica na Krasu and then on the Banjšice plateau, before being sent to Monte Tomba. In 1918 the group was deployed on the Monte Asolone.

The Mountain Artillery Group "Vicenza" fought in 1915 on Monte Matassone, Monte Pozzacchio and on Monte Coston. In 1916 the group was deployed on Monte Maronia and Monte Majo. The group was then deployed on the Sabotin, the Škabrijel, the Pečinka, and finally on the Veliki Hribach. In 1917 the group was once more on the Pečinka and Veliki Hribach, before being sent to fight on the Monte Vodice and the Banjšice plateau.

The Mountain Artillery Group "Belluno" was in 1915–16 deployed at the Tre Cime di Lavaredo, on Monte Piana, in the Sexten valley, and at the Kreuzberg Pass. In 1916 the group remained in the Dolomites and was deployed towards the Passo della Sentinella. In 1917 the group was on the Cima Forame, then returned to Monte Piana. During the same year the group was at the Stretta di Quero and on Monte Solarolo. In 1918 the group was in the Val Calcino and then on Monte Grappa.

=== Interwar years ===
In 1919 the regiment moved from Vicenza to Belluno and was reduced to the groups "Belluno", XXI and XXVI, each with three batteries with 75/13 mod. 15 mountain guns. On 21 February 1921 the mountain groups lost their names and the regiment consisted of the I, II, and III groups. On 1 July 1923 the regiment formed the IV Group with 100/17 mod. 14 howitzers.

On 11 March 1926 the Royal Italian Army reorganized its artillery. As Alpini units were traditionally numbered from West to East the army decided that the 2nd Mountain Artillery Regiment and 3rd Mountain Artillery Regiment should swap numbers. Furthermore, the army decided that mountain artillery groups should again be named and not numbered and that the groups with 100/17 mod. 14 howitzers should be transferred to the field artillery. The two regiments also redistributed their groups and so the new 3rd Mountain Artillery Regiment consisted after the swap of the groups "Conegliano" and "Udine", while the regiment's former III Group was transferred to the new 2nd Mountain Artillery Regiment and became the Group "Belluno". The regiment's IV Group with 100/17 mod. 14 howitzers was transferred to the 6th Field Artillery Regiment. After the reform the regiment moved from Belluno to Gorizia. On 1 December 1929 the regiment received the Group "Belluno" from the 2nd Mountain Artillery Regiment. Afterwards the 3rd Mountain Artillery Regiment consisted of the Group "Conegliano", with the 13th, 14th, and 15th batteries, the Group "Udine", with the 16th and 17th batteries, and the Group "Belluno", with the 22nd, 23rd, and 24th batteries. The regiment was assigned to the III Alpine Brigade, which also included the 8th Alpini Regiment and 9th Alpini Regiment.

In 1934 the regiment formed the 18th Battery for the Group "Udine". On 27 October 1934 the III Alpine Brigade changed its name to III Superior Alpine Command and the regiment was renamed 3rd Alpine Artillery Regiment. In December of the same year the command was given the name "Julia". On 10 September 1935 the III Superior Alpine Command "Julia" was renamed 3rd Alpine Division "Julia" and consequently the regiment was renamed 3rd Alpine Artillery Regiment "Julia". On 31 December 1935 the regiment ceded the Group "Belluno" to help form the 5th Alpine Artillery Regiment "Pusteria". To ready the new regiment quickly for the Second Italo-Ethiopian War the other alpine artillery regiments transferred existing batteries temporarily to the new regiment. In case of the 3rd Alpine Artillery Regiment "Julia" the 13th Battery of the Group "Conegliano" was transferred to the newly formed Alpine Artillery Group "Lanzo", but returned to the regiment, when the Group "Lanzo" was disbanded after the war on 12 April 1937. On 25 September 1937 the regiment's Group "Udine" ceded its 16th Battery permanently to the reformed the Group "Lanzo".

=== World War II ===
In December 1939 the regiment mobilized the Alpine Artillery Group "Valle Isonzo" (37th, 38th, and 39th batteries) and Alpine Artillery Group "Val Tagliamento" (41st, 42nd, and 43rd batteries). On 1 May 1940 the Group "Val Tagliamento" was transferred to the 1st Alpini Group, while the Group "Valle Isonzo" was transferred to the 2nd Alpini Group. On 10 June 1940, the day Italy entered World War II, the regiment consisted of a command, command unit, the Group "Conegliano" (13th, 14th, and 15th batteries), and the Group "Udine" (17th and 18th batteries). Both groups were equipped with 75/13 mod. 15 mountain guns. The regiment was assigned, together with the 8th Alpini Regiment and 9th Alpini Regiment, to the 3rd Alpine Division "Julia".

In October 1940 the 39th Battery of the Group "Valle Isonzo" was disbanded and the same month the 3rd Alpine Division "Julia" was transferred to Albania to shore up the crumbling Italian front during the Greco-Italian War. The division entered combat on 28 October 1940 in the Battle of Pindus, where it suffered heavy casualties. The division was withdrawn from the front on 10 November, and the 3rd Alpine Artillery Regiment "Julia" was reinforced temporarily with two groups that had been formed by the 4th Alpine Artillery Regiment "Cuneense": the Alpine Artillery Group "Val Tanaro" (25th, 26th, and 27th batteries) and the Alpine Artillery Group "Val Po" (72nd, 73rd, and 74th batteries). Four days later, on 14 November 1940, the division was back at the front and in constant combat with Greek Army units until 8 December. After a brief pause the Greeks attacked again on 23 December and on 31 December the division retreated to Mali Qarishta in extreme weather conditions. On 8 January 1941 a Greek offensive in the Berat sector hit the Italian division hard. The following day the division had to retreat to Mali Tabajan, and by 21 January the division was down to three understrength battalions. The remnants of the division were withdrawn and transferred to Mavrovo, near Vlorë, where the division was rebuilt.

At the end of February the division was back in the first line. On 28 February a new battle was fought in the Tepelenë sector and the division once more suffered heavy casualties. On 7 March the Greeks attacked again, and just two days later they renewed the attack, which caused heavy losses among the Italian troops. By 11 March the Greek offensive ended as both, the 3rd Alpine Division "Julia", and the 2nd and the 17th Greek divisions were worn out by the heavy fighting. On 5 March 1941 the Group "Val Piave" of the 5th Alpine Artillery Regiment "Pusteria" ceded its 34th Battery to the Group "Udine". In April 1941, following the German invasion of Greece, the Julia division was transferred to the area of the Corinth Canal and occupied the Peloponnese. During the Greco-Italian War the division had suffered overall 9,317 casualties: 49 officers and 1,625 soldiers during October–November 1940, 153 officers and 3,644 soldiers between December 1940 and January 1941, and 116 officers and 3,730 soldiers between February and April 1941.

For its bravery and sacrifice on the Greek front the 3rd Alpine Artillery Regiment "Julia" was awarded Italy's highest military the Gold Medal of Military Valor, which was affixed to the regiment's flag and is depicted on the regiment's coat of arms.

In spring 1942 the 3rd Alpine Division "Julia" was assigned, together with the 2nd Alpine Division "Tridentina" and 4th Alpine Division "Cuneense", to the Italian 8th Army, which was sent in summer 1942 to the Eastern Front. In preparation for the deployment to the Soviet Union the Alpine Artillery Group "Val Piave", with the 35th, 36th, and 39th batteries, was assigned in April 1942 to the regiment. The Group "Val Piave" was equipped with 105/11 mod. 28 mountain guns. The regiment also received the 45th and 47th anti-aircraft batteries with 20/65 mod. 35 anti-aircraft guns, and after arriving in the Soviet Union the regiment received in September 1942 the 77th Anti-tank Battery with Pak 97/38 anti-tank guns. During its time in the Soviet Union the regiment consisted of the following units:

- 3rd Alpine Artillery Regiment "Julia"
  - Command Unit
  - Alpine Artillery Group "Conegliano"
    - Command Unit
    - 13th Battery, with 4× 75/13 mod. 15 mountain guns
    - 14th Battery, with 4× 75/13 mod. 15 mountain guns
    - 15th Battery, with 4× 75/13 mod. 15 mountain guns
    - Ammunition and Supply Unit
  - Alpine Artillery Group "Udine"
    - Command Unit
    - 17th Battery, with 4× 75/13 mod. 15 mountain guns
    - 18th Battery, with 4× 75/13 mod. 15 mountain guns
    - 34th Battery, with 4× 75/13 mod. 15 mountain guns
    - Ammunition and Supply Unit
  - Alpine Artillery Group "Val Piave"
    - Command Unit
    - 35th Battery, with 4× 105/11 mod. 28 mountain guns
    - 36th Battery, with 4× 105/11 mod. 28 mountain guns
    - 39th Battery, with 4× 105/11 mod. 28 mountain guns
    - Ammunition and Supply Unit
  - 45th Anti-aircraft Battery, with 8× 20/65 mod. 35 anti-aircraft guns
  - 47th Battery, with 8× 20/65 mod. 35 anti-aircraft guns
  - 77th Anti-tank Battery, with 6× Pak 97/38 anti-tank guns

The groups "Conegliano" and "Udine" fielded 1,296 men (32 officers, 32 non-commissioned officers, and 1,232 soldiers), which operated twelve 75/13 mod. 15 mountain guns. Being an alpine unit the group's main mode of transport were mules, of which the group had 720.

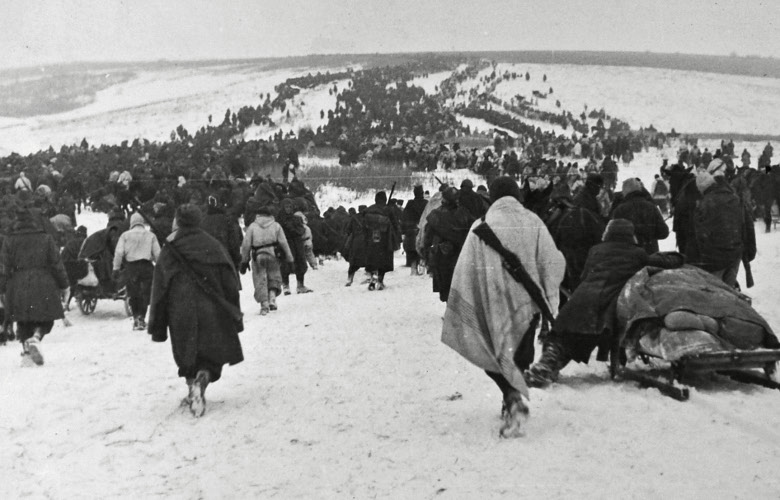
The retreat of the Italian 8th Army towards Nikolayevka

In July 1942 the three alpine division, grouped together in the Alpine Army Corps, arrived in Eastern Ukraine, from where they marched eastwards towards the Don river. The Italian 8th Army covered the left flank of the German 6th Army, which spearheaded the German summer offensive of 1942 towards Stalingrad. On 12 December 1942 the Red Army commenced Operation Little Saturn, which, in its first stage, attacked and encircled the Italian II Army Corps and XXXV Army Corps, to the southeast of the Alpine Army Corps. On 13 January 1943, the Red Army launched the second stage of Operation Little Saturn with the Voronezh Front encircling and destroying the Hungarian Second Army to the northwest of the Alpine Army Corps.

On the evening of 17 January 1943, the Alpine Army Corps commander, General Gabriele Nasci, ordered a full retreat. At this point only the 2nd Alpine Division "Tridentina" was still capable of conducting combat operations. The 40,000-strong mass of stragglers — Alpini and Italians from other commands, plus German and Hungarians — followed the Tridentina division, which led the way westwards to the Axis lines. As the Soviets had already occupied every village bitter battles had to be fought to clear the way. By morning of 28 January the Julia had walked 200 km, fought 20 battles, and spent 11 nights camped out in the middle of the Russian Steppe. Temperatures during the nights were between −30 °C and −40 °C. On 1 February 1943 the remnants of the Alpine Army Corps reached Axis lines. The Julia suffered heavy losses in the breakout: less than a tenth of the division survived (approximately 1,200 survivors of 18,000 troops deployed).

For its bravery and sacrifice in the Soviet Union the 3rd Alpine Artillery Regiment "Julia" was awarded a Gold Medal of Military Valor, which was affixed to the regiment's flag and is depicted on the regiment's coat of arms. The regiment was still in the process of being rebuilt, when the Armistice of Cassibile was announced on 8 September 1943. On 12 September the regiment was disbanded near Udine by invading German forces.

=== Cold War ===
On 22 August 1947 the 184th Artillery Regiment "Folgore" reformed the Mountain Artillery Group "Belluno" as the first mountain artillery group to be reformed after World War II. The group was based in Belluno and consisted of the 22nd, 23rd, and 24th batteries, which were equipped with 75/13 mod. 15 mountain guns. On 1 March 1948 the group was transferred to the I Territorial Military Command. On 15 October 1949 the group entered the newly formed Alpine Brigade "Julia". On 1 November 1950 the group reformed the 25th Battery 75/13 mod. 15 mountain guns. On 1 February 1951 the 3rd Mountain Artillery Regiment was reformed in Udine and assigned to the Alpine Brigade "Julia". Initially the regiment consisted of a command and the Group "Belluno". On 1 April 1951 the regiment formed its command unit. On 30 June 1951 the 41st Anti-tank Field Artillery Regiment ceded its IV Anti-tank Group with QF 6-pounder anti-tank guns to the 3rd Mountain Artillery Regiment, which renamed the group the next Anti-tank Group "Julia". The same day, 1 July 1951, the Mountain Artillery Group "Conegliano" was reformed in Udine and equipped with 100/17 mod. 14 howitzers and the regiment received a Light Anti-aircraft Group with 40/56 anti-aircraft autocannons from the Anti-aircraft Artillery School.

On 1 April 1952 the Mountain Artillery Group "Gemona" was formed in Tolmezzo and equipped with M30 107mm mortars. In the course of the year 1952 the Group "Belluno" moved from Belluno to Pontebba and the following year from Pontebba to Tolmezzo. On 14 December 1952 the Anti-tank Group "Julia" was disbanded. Initially only the Group "Belluno" consisted of batteries with traditional mountain battery numbers, but on 15 March 1955 the army's General Staff ordered that also the groups with 100/17 mod. 14 howitzers and M30 107mm mortars should receive traditional mountain battery numbers. Consequently, all the batteries of the regiment were renumbered and afterwards the regiment consisted of the following groups and batteries:

- 3rd Mountain Artillery Regiment, in Udine
  - Command Unit
  - Mountain Artillery Group "Belluno", in Tolmezzo
    - Command Unit
    - 22nd, 23rd, 24th, and 25th batteries with 75/13 mod. 15 mountain guns
  - Mountain Artillery Group "Conegliano", in Udine
    - Command Unit
    - 13th and 14th batteries with 100/17 mod. 14 howitzers
  - Mountain Artillery Group "Gemona", in Tolmezzo
    - Command Unit
    - 17th, 18th, and 34th batteries with M30 107mm mortars
  - Light Anti-aircraft Group, in Udine
    - Command Unit
    - 1st, 2nd, and 3rd batteries with 40/56 anti-aircraft autocannons

On 1 July 1956 the regiment formed a Light Aircraft Section with L-21B artillery observation planes. The same year the regiment formed the 15th Battery for the Group "Conegliano". As the Group "Gemona" consisted of the traditional batteries of the Group "Udine" on 1 January 1957 the Mountain Artillery Group "Gemona" was renamed Mountain Artillery Group "Udine". On 13 May of the same year the Light Anti-aircraft Group was transferred to the 5th Heavy Anti-aircraft Artillery Regiment. In 1958 the Group "Udine" was equipped with Brandt AM-50 120mm mortars and the Light Aircraft Section was transferred to the brigade command.

In 1959 the Group "Belluno" and Group "Conegliano" received 105/14 mod. 56 pack howitzers. The following year the regiment's groups were reorganized and on 1 September 1960 the Group "Belluno" transferred its 25th Battery with 105/14 mod. 56 pack howitzers to the Group "Conegliano". At the same time the Brandt AM-50 120mm mortars of the Group "Udine" were distributed among the three groups, which fielded afterwards two howitzer, respectively in the case of the Group "Conegliano" three howitzer batteries, and one mortar battery each. On 15 October 1961 the regiment formed the Mountain Artillery Group "Osoppo" in Pontebba. The group consisted of the 25th Battery with 105/14 mod. 56 pack howitzers, which had been ceded by the Group "Conegliano", and the newly formed 26th Battery. On 1 May 1962 the Group "Osoppo" formed a mortar battery, which on 1 August of the same year was designated as 27th Battery. The 25th, 26th and 27th batteries were first formed in 1905 by the depot of the 22nd Field Artillery Regiment in Palermo. The three batteries were initially numbered 16th, 17th and 18th and assigned to the VI Mountain Brigade "Messina", which was based in Messina. In 1910 the brigade was redesignated as (IX) Mountain Artillery Group "Messina" and consequently the group's batteries were renumbered 25th, 26th and 27th. On 1 February 1915 the 1st Mountain Artillery Regiment ceded the (I) Mountain Artillery Group "Oneglia" to help form the 3rd Mountain Artillery Regiment. The Group "Oneglia" was renumbered as (IX) Mountain Artillery Group "Oneglia" and the battery numbers 25th, 26th and 27th passed to the Group "Oneglia".

As the Alpine Brigade "Julia" was tasked with defending the Canal Valley, which was considered to be the most likely invasion route for a Warsaw Pact attack on Italy, the 3rd Mountain Artillery Regiment was augmented even further on 1 December 1963 with the transfer of the Mountain Artillery Group "Pinerolo" from the 3rd Mountain Artillery Regiment. The Group "Pinerolo" moved from Susa to Tolmezzo and, although now stationed in Friuli-Venezia Giulia, the group retained its traditional recruiting area in Piedmont. as a result of the arrival of the Group Pinerolo in Tolmezzo the Group "Belluno" moved from Tolmezzo to Tarvisio in 1964. In 1968 the 3rd Mountain Artillery Regiment and the Group "Conegliano" moved from Udine to Gemona. Afterwards the regiment consisted of the following units:

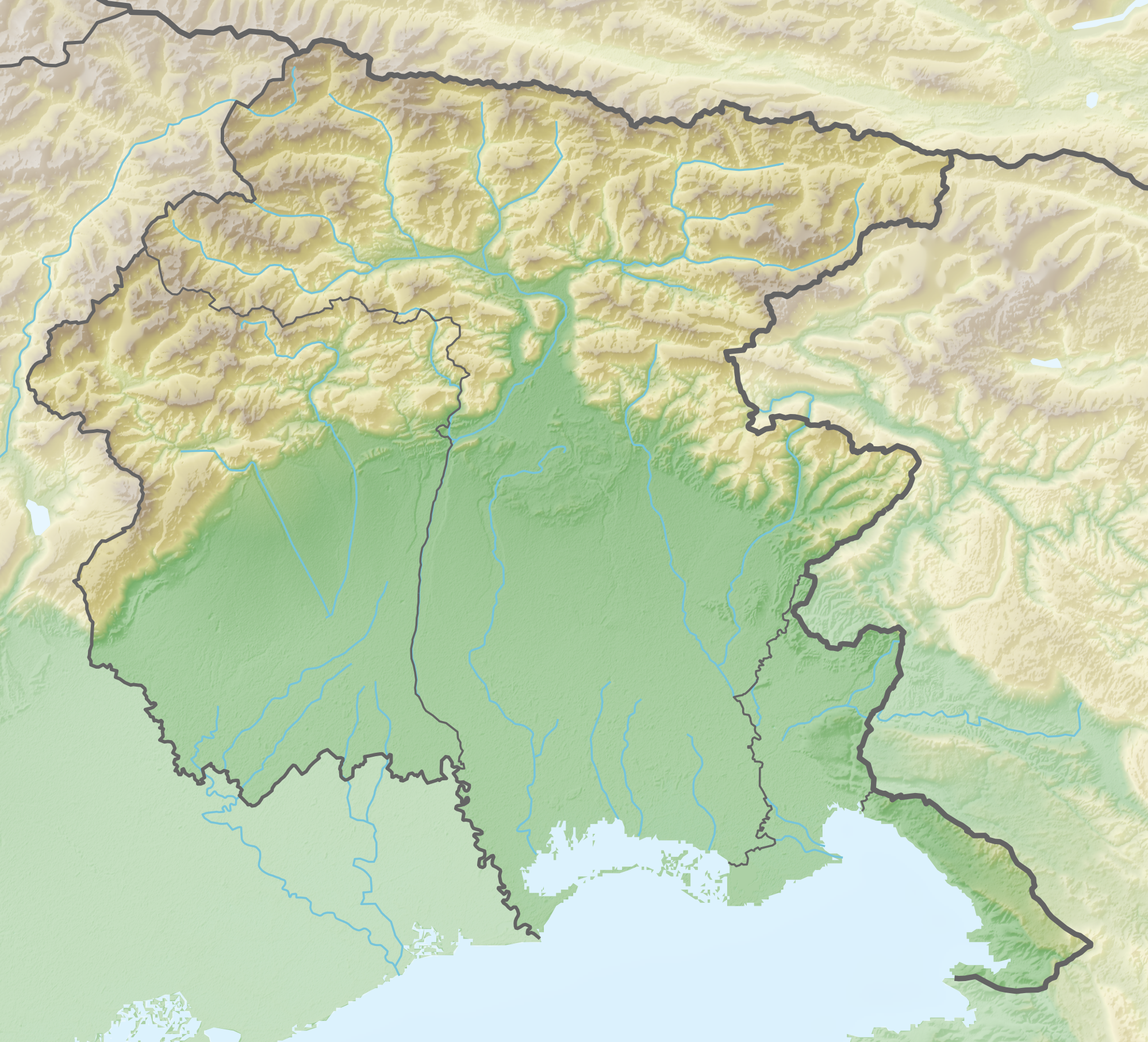
Location of the regiment and its groups in Friuli-Venezia Giulia at the end of 1968
- 3rd Mountain Artillery Regiment, in Gemona
  - Command Unit
  - Mountain Artillery Group "Pinerolo", in Tolmezzo
    - Command Unit
    - 7th Battery, with 105/14 mod. 56 pack howitzers
    - 8th Battery, with 105/14 mod. 56 pack howitzers
    - 9th Battery, with Brandt AM-50 120mm mortars
  - Mountain Artillery Group "Conegliano", in Gemona
    - Command Unit
    - 13th Battery, with 105/14 mod. 56 pack howitzers
    - 14th Battery, with 105/14 mod. 56 pack howitzers
    - 15th Battery, with Brandt AM-50 120mm mortars
  - Mountain Artillery Group "Udine", in Tolmezzo
    - Command Unit
    - 17th Battery, with 105/14 mod. 56 pack howitzers
    - 18th Battery, with 105/14 mod. 56 pack howitzers
    - 34th Battery, with Brandt AM-50 120mm mortars
  - Mountain Artillery Group "Belluno", in Tarvisio
    - Command Unit
    - 22nd Battery, with 105/14 mod. 56 pack howitzers
    - 23rd Battery, with 105/14 mod. 56 pack howitzers
    - 24th Battery, with Brandt AM-50 120mm mortars
  - Mountain Artillery Group "Osoppo", in Pontebba
    - Command Unit
    - 25th Battery, with 105/14 mod. 56 pack howitzers
    - 26th Battery, with 105/14 mod. 56 pack howitzers
    - 27th Battery, with Brandt AM-50 120mm mortars

On 1 April 1970 all the mountain groups' mortar batteries were equipped with 105/14 mod. 56 pack howitzers. On 31 December 1974 the Group "Pinerolo" was placed in reserve status.

During the 1975 army reform the army disbanded the regimental level and newly independent battalions and groups were granted for the first time their own flags. On 1 June 1975 the Group "Pinerolo" was disbanded, followed on 31 August by the Group "Belluno". On 5 September the Group "Osoppo" was renamed Mountain Artillery Group "Belluno". On 30 September 1975 the 3rd Mountain Artillery Regiment was disbanded and the next day its remaining three groups became autonomous units and were assigned to the Alpine Brigade "Julia". The groups consisted of a command, a command and services battery, and three batteries with 105/14 mod. 56 pack howitzers, with one of the batteries being mule-carried. At the time each of the three groups fielded 610 men (35 officers, 55 non-commissioned officers, and 520 soldiers).

On 12 November 1976 the President of the Italian Republic Giovanni Leone issued decree 846, which assigned the flag and traditions of the 3rd Mountain Artillery Regiment to the Mountain Artillery Group "Conegliano". With the same decree the Mountain Artillery Group "Belluno" and Mountain Artillery Group "Udine" were both granted a new flag.

For its conduct and work after the 1976 Friuli earthquake the Mountain Artillery Group "Conegliano" was awarded a Silver Medal of Army Valor, which was affixed to the group's war flag and added to the group's coat of arms. The same year the group moved from Gemona to Udine. In 1983 the Mountain Artillery Group "Conegliano" was equipped with M114 155mm howitzers.

=== Recent times ===
After the end of the Cold War the Italian Army began to draw down its forces. On 31 October 1989 the 22nd Battery and the Command and Services Battery of the Mountain Artillery Group "Belluno" were disbanded, while the 23th and 24th batteries were transferred to the Mountain Artillery Group "Udine". Afterwards the 24th Battery was reorganized as 24th Light Anti-aircraft Battery and equipped with Stinger man-portable air-defense systems. In 1991 the Italian Army's General Staff decided that the Mountain Artillery Group "Udine" should become a light anti-aircraft artillery group. In preparation for the reorganization the 24th Light Anti-aircraft Battery was transferred on 4 December 1991 from the Mountain Artillery Group "Udine" to the Mountain Artillery Group "Conegliano". Afterwards the two groups exchanged their names and flags. Two days later, on 6 December 1991, the Mountain Artillery Group "Udine", which was now based in Udine, was reorganized as Light Anti-aircraft Artillery Group "Udine". The Mountain Artillery Group "Conegliano" was based after the reorganization in Tolmezzo and consisted of the 13th, 14th, and 15th batteries with 105/14 mod. 56 pack howitzers and the 24th Light Anti-aircraft Battery with Stinger man-portable air-defense systems.

On 31 July 1992 the Mountain Artillery Group "Conegliano" lost its autonomy and the next day the group entered the reformed 3rd Mountain Artillery Regiment. The regiment consisted now of the following units:

- 3rd Mountain Artillery Regiment, in Tolmezzo
  - Command and Services Battery
  - 24th Light Anti-aircraft Battery, with Stinger man-portable air-defense systems
  - Group "Conegliano"
    - 13th Battery, with 105/14 mod. 56 pack howitzers
    - 14th Battery, with 105/14 mod. 56 pack howitzers
    - 15th Battery, with 105/14 mod. 56 pack howitzers

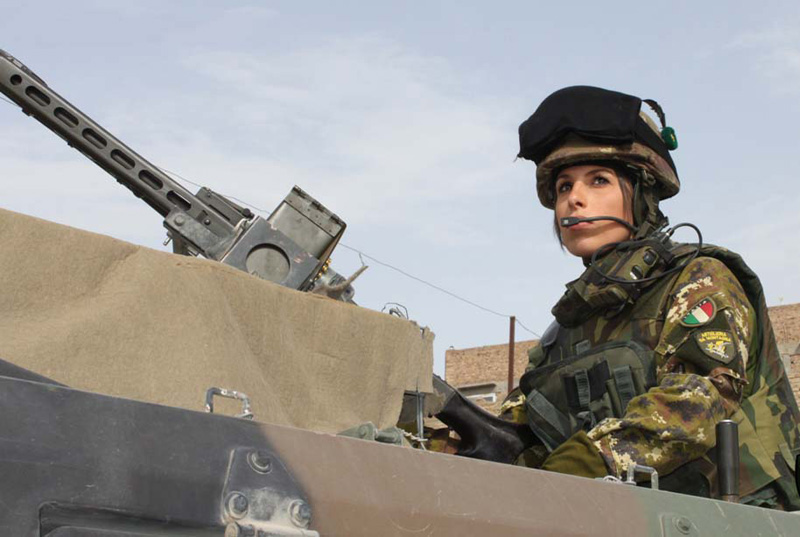
3rd Field Artillery Regiment (Mountain) on patrol in Afghanistan with VTLM Lince

On 30 November 2001 the regiment was renamed 3rd Field Artillery Regiment (Mountain) and the same year the regiment reorganized the 24th Light Anti-aircraft Battery as 24th Surveillance, Target Acquisition and Tactical Liaison Battery. Furthermore, during the same year the regiment reformed the 17th Battery, which had been part of the Light Anti-aircraft Artillery Group "Udine" and been disbanded on 31 July 1995, as 17th Fire and Technical Support Battery. At the same time the regiment was equipped with FH-70 155mm howitzers.

On 3 November 2016 the regiment moved from Tolmezzo to Remanzacco. For its conduct and work during the COVID-19 pandemic the regiment was awarded a Silver Cross of Army Merit, which was affixed to the regiment's flag.

== Organization ==
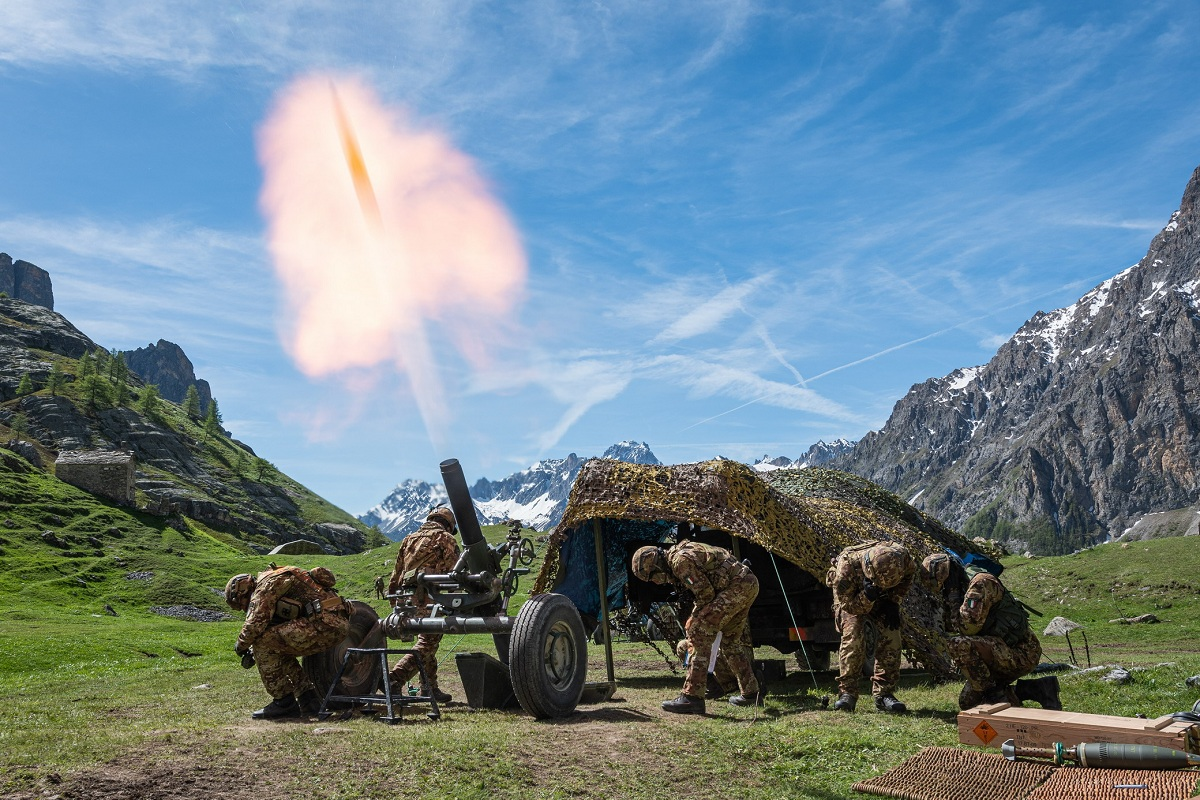
3rd Field Artillery Regiment (Mountain) mortar fire during exercise "Alabarda d’Argento 5/25"

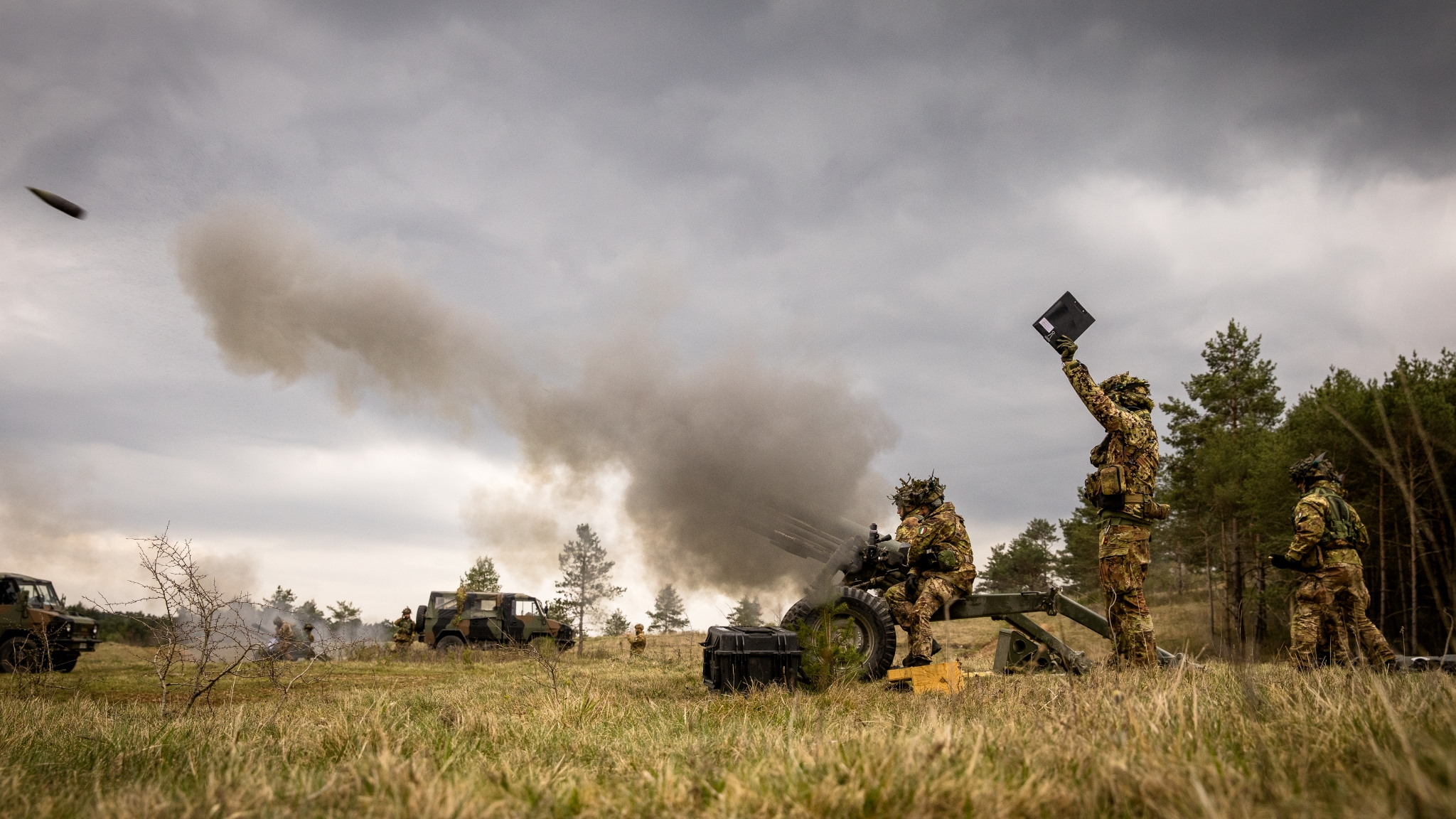
3rd Field Artillery Regiment (Mountain) 14th Howitzer Battery 105/14 mod. 56 howitzer fire during exercise "Iron Hail 2026"

As of 2026 the 3rd Field Artillery Regiment (Mountain) is organized as follows:

- 3rd Field Artillery Regiment (Mountain), in Remanzacco
  - Command and Logistic Support Battery
  - 24th Surveillance, Target Acquisition and Tactical Liaison Battery
  - Group "Conegliano"
    - 13th Howitzer Battery
    - 14th Howitzer Battery
    - 15th Howitzer Battery
    - 17th Fire and Technical Support Battery

The regiment is equipped with FH-70 155mm howitzers, 105/14 mod. 56 pack howitzers and 120 mm mortars.

== See also ==
- Alpine Brigade "Julia"
