= Mountain Artillery Group "Udine" =

Inactive Italian Army mountain artillery unit

- Gruppo Artiglieria da Montagna "Udine"
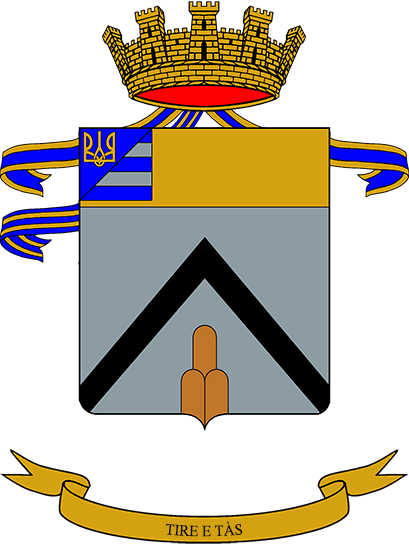
- Group coat of arms
- Active: 1 Oct. 1975 – 31 July 1995
- Country: Italy
- Branch: Italian Army
- Part of: Alpine Brigade "Julia"
- Garrison/HQ: Vacile
- Motto: "Tire e tàs"
- Anniversaries: 15 June 1918 – Second Battle of the Piave River
- Decorations: 2× Gold Medals of Military Valor; 1× Silver Medal of Army Valor

Insignia
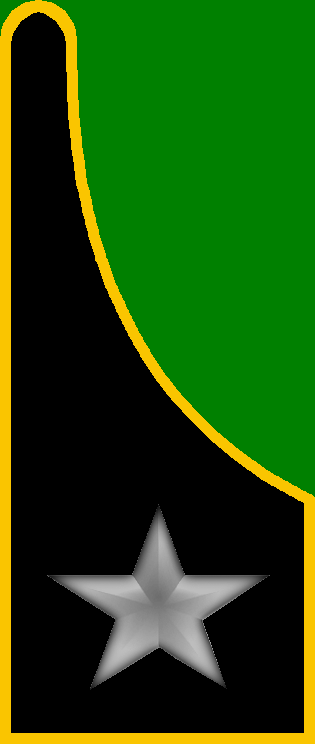
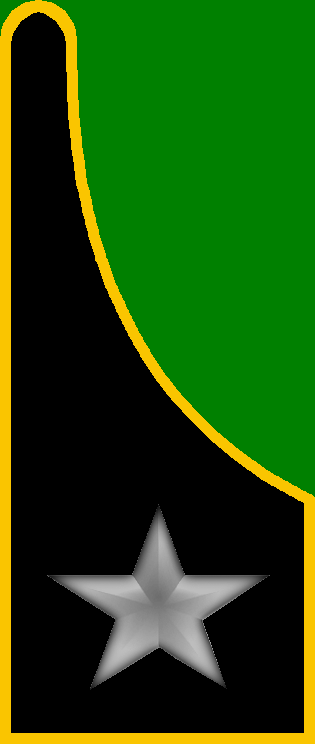
- Regimental gorget patches

The Mountain Artillery Group "Udine" (Italian: Gruppo Artiglieria da Montagna "Udine") is an inactive mountain artillery group of the Italian Army, which was based in Vacile in Friuli-Venezia Giulia. The group was formed on 1 February 1915 by the Royal Italian Army's 2nd Mountain Artillery Regiment and served with the regiment during World War I on the Italian front. In World War II the group was assigned to the 3rd Alpine Artillery Regiment "Julia", with which it participated in the invasion of France and the Greco-Italian War. In summer 1942 the 3rd Alpine Artillery Regiment "Julia" was transferred to the Soviet Union, where it was destroyed in winter 1942–43 during the Soviet Operation Little Saturn. The remnants of the regiment were repatriated in spring 1943 and invading German forces disbanded the regiment and its groups after the announcement of the Armistice of Cassibile on 8 September 1943.

The group was reformed in 1957 and assigned to the 3rd Mountain Artillery Regiment of the Alpine Brigade "Julia". In 1975 the group became an autonomous unit and was granted a flag and coat of arms. After the end of the Cold War the group was reorganized as Light Anti-aircraft Artillery Group "Udine" and in 1995 it was disbanded. The Italian mountain artillery has served since its inception alongside the infantry's Alpini speciality, with whom the mountain artillery shares the distinctive Cappello Alpino. The regimental anniversary falls, as for all Italian Army artillery units, on June 15, the beginning of the Second Battle of the Piave River in 1918.

== History ==
=== World War I ===
On 1 February 1915 the 2nd Mountain Artillery Regiment ceded its Group "Bergamo" to help form the 3rd Mountain Artillery Regiment. The 2nd Mountain Artillery Regiment retained the numbers of the batteries of the Group "Bergamo" (16th, 17th, 18th) and assigned them to the batteries of the newly formed Mountain Artillery Group "Udine", which was formed on the same date in Udine. The group's batteries were equipped with 65/17 mod. 13 mountain guns. The group entered World War I with the following organization:

- (VI) Mountain Artillery Group "Udine"
  - 16th Mountain Artillery Battery
  - 17th Mountain Artillery Battery
  - 18th Mountain Artillery Battery

During the war the 2nd Mountain Artillery Regiment was broken up and its groups and batteries attached to different Alpini units. The Mountain Artillery Group "Udine" was deployed in 1915 at Tolmin and fought for control of the hills of Bučenica and Mengore. In 1916 the group was initially on the Sabotin, but sent in May 1916 to Monte Cengio on the Asiago plateau during the Battle of Asiago. Afterwards the group was on Monte Novegno and then deployed to the Veliki Hribach. In November 1916 the regiment formed the 56th Mountain Artillery Battery for the Group "Udine". In 1917 the group fought at Kostanjevica na Krasu and then on the Banjšice plateau, before being sent to Monte Tomba. In 1918 the group was deployed on the Monte Asolone.

=== Interwar years ===
In 1919 the regiment was reduced to the groups "Belluno", XXI and XXVI, which were equipped with 75/13 mod. 15 mountain guns. On 11 March 1926 the Royal Italian Army reorganized its artillery. As Alpini units were traditionally numbered from West to East the army decided that the 2nd Mountain Artillery Regiment and 3rd Mountain Artillery Regiment should swap numbers. The two regiments also redistributed their groups, which returned to their traditional names. After the reorganization the new 3rd Mountain Artillery Regiment consisted of the groups "Conegliano" and "Udine". At the time the group consisted of the 16th and 17th batteries, as the 18th Battery was only reformed in 1934. On 25 September 1937 the Group "Udine" ceded its 16th Battery to the Alpine Artillery Group "Lanzo".

=== World War I ===
On 10 June 1940, the day Italy entered World War II, the Alpine Artillery Group "Udine", with the 17th and 18th batteries, was assigned to the 3rd Alpine Artillery Regiment "Julia" of the 3rd Alpine Division "Julia". The two batteries were equipped with 75/13 mod. 15 mountain guns. In October 1940 the regiment was transferred to Albania to shore up the crumbling Italian front during the Greco-Italian War. On 5 March 1941 the Group "Val Piave" of the 5th Alpine Artillery Regiment "Pusteria" ceded its 34th Battery to the Group "Udine". For its bravery and sacrifice on the Greek front the 3rd Alpine Artillery Regiment "Julia" was awarded Italy's highest military the Gold Medal of Military Valor.

In spring 1942 the 3rd Alpine Division "Julia" was assigned, together with the 2nd Alpine Division "Tridentina" and 4th Alpine Division "Cuneense", to the Italian 8th Army, which was sent in summer 1942 to the Eastern Front. The Group "Udine" deployed to the Soviet Union with the following organization:

- Alpine Artillery Group "Udine"
  - Command Unit
  - 17th Battery, with 4× 75/13 mod. 15 mountain guns
  - 18th Battery, with 4× 75/13 mod. 15 mountain guns
  - 34th Battery, with 4× 75/13 mod. 15 mountain guns
  - Ammunition and Supply Unit

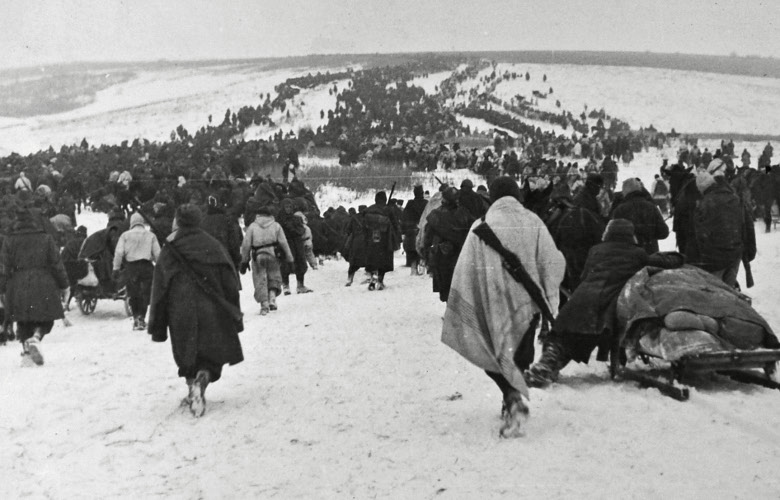
The retreat of the Italian 8th Army towards Nikolayevka

In July 1942 the three alpine division, grouped together in the Alpine Army Corps, arrived in Eastern Ukraine, from where they marched eastwards towards the Don river. In January 1943 the Alpine Army Corps was forced to retreat to escape encirclement during the Soviet Operation Little Saturn. Most of the units of the corps were destroyed during the retreat and the few survivors were repatriated in spring 1943. For its bravery and sacrifice in the Soviet Union the regiment was awarded a Gold Medal of Military Valor. The regiment and its groups were still in the process of being rebuilt, when the Armistice of Cassibile was announced on 8 September 1943. On 12 September the regiment and its groups were disbanded near Udine by invading German forces.

=== Cold War ===
On 1 April 1952 the 3rd Mountain Artillery Regiment formed the Mountain Artillery Group "Gemona" in Tolmezzo. The group was equipped with M30 107mm mortars and consisted of the 17th, 18th, and 34th batteries, which had been the batteries of the Group "Udine" during World War II. Consequently, on 1 January 1957 the Mountain Artillery Group "Gemona" was renamed Mountain Artillery Group "Udine". In 1958 the group replaced its M30 107mm mortars with Brandt AM-50 120mm mortars. In 1960 the Brandt AM-50 120mm mortars of the Group "Udine" were distributed among the three groups of the regiment, which fielded afterwards two howitzer, respectively in the case of the Group "Conegliano" three howitzer batteries, and one mortar battery each. The Group "Udine" was now organized as follows:

- Mountain Artillery Group "Udine", in Tolmezzo
  - Command Unit
  - 17th Battery, with 105/14 mod. 56 pack howitzers
  - 18th Battery, with 105/14 mod. 56 pack howitzers
  - 34th Battery, with Brandt AM-50 120mm mortars

In 1970 all the mountain groups' mortar batteries were equipped with 105/14 mod. 56 pack howitzers. During the 1975 army reform the army disbanded the regimental level and newly independent battalions and groups were granted for the first time their own flags. On 30 September 1975 the 3rd Mountain Artillery Regiment was disbanded and the next day its remaining three groups became autonomous units and were assigned to the Alpine Brigade "Julia". The groups consisted of a command, a command and services battery, and three batteries with 105/14 mod. 56 pack howitzers, with one of the batteries being mule-carried. At the time each of the three groups fielded 610 men (35 officers, 55 non-commissioned officers, and 520 soldiers).

On 12 November 1976 the President of the Italian Republic Giovanni Leone issued decree 846, which assigned the flag and traditions of the 3rd Mountain Artillery Regiment to the Mountain Artillery Group "Conegliano". With the same decree the Mountain Artillery Group "Belluno" and Mountain Artillery Group "Udine" were both granted a new flag. The two Gold Medals of Military Valor, which had been awarded to the 3rd Alpine Artillery Regiment "Julia" for its service in World War II, were duplicated for the Group "Udine" and affixed to the group's flag. Both medals are also depicted on the group's coat of arms.

For its conduct and work after the 1976 Friuli earthquake the Mountain Artillery Group "Udine" was awarded a Silver Medal of Army Valor, which was affixed to the group's war flag and added to the group's coat of arms.

=== Recent times ===
After the end of the Cold War the Italian Army began to draw down its forces. On 31 October 1989 the 22nd Battery and the Command and Services Battery of the Mountain Artillery Group "Belluno" were disbanded, while the 23th and 24th batteries were transferred to the Mountain Artillery Group "Udine". Afterwards the 24th Battery was reorganized as 24th Light Anti-aircraft Battery and equipped with Stinger man-portable air-defense systems. In 1991 the Italian Army's General Staff decided that the Mountain Artillery Group "Udine" should become a light anti-aircraft artillery group. In preparation for the reorganization the 24th Light Anti-aircraft Battery was transferred on 4 December 1991 from the Mountain Artillery Group "Udine" to the Mountain Artillery Group "Conegliano". Afterwards the two groups exchanged their names and flags. Two days later, on 6 December 1991, the Mountain Artillery Group "Udine", which was now based in Udine, was reorganized as Light Anti-aircraft Artillery Group "Udine" and assigned to the 4th Alpine Army Corps.

On 1 March 1992 the group moved from Udine to Vacile. On 31 July 1995 the Light Anti-aircraft Artillery Group "Udine" was disbanded and on 3 August the groups's flag was transferred to the Shrine of the Flags in the Vittoriano in Rome. As of 2023 the traditions of the Mountain Artillery Group "Udine" are carried on by the 17th Fire and Technical Support Battery of the 3rd Field Artillery Regiment (Mountain).
