= 5th Mountain Artillery Regiment (Italy) =

Inactive Italian Army mountain artillery unit

- 5° Reggimento Artiglieria da Montagna
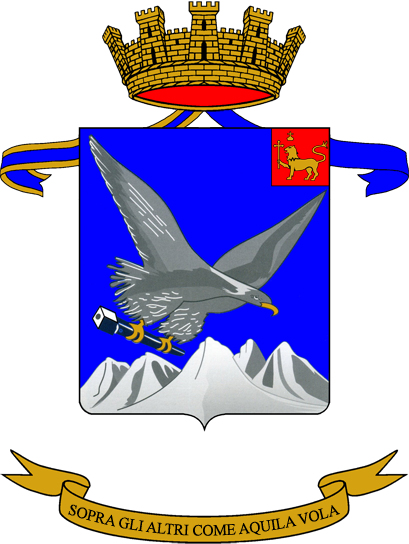
- Regimental coat of arms
- Active: 31 Dec. 1935 – 8 Sept. 1943; 1 July 1953 – 15 May 2001
- Country: Italy
- Branch: Italian Army
- Part of: Alpine Brigade "Orobica"
- Garrison/HQ: Meran
- Motto: "Sopra gli altri come aquila vola"
- Anniversaries: 15 June 1918 – Second Battle of the Piave River
- Decorations: 1× Gold Medal of Military Valor; 1× Bronze Medal of Military Valor

Insignia
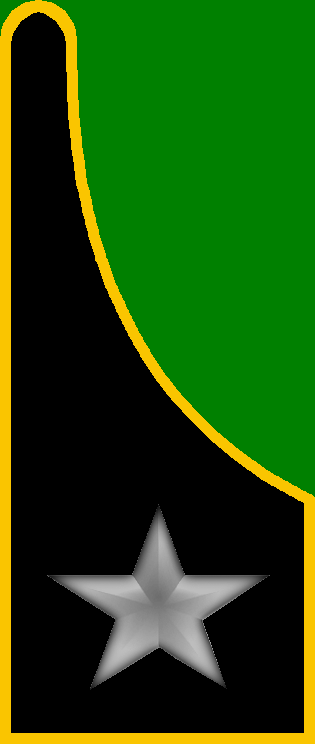
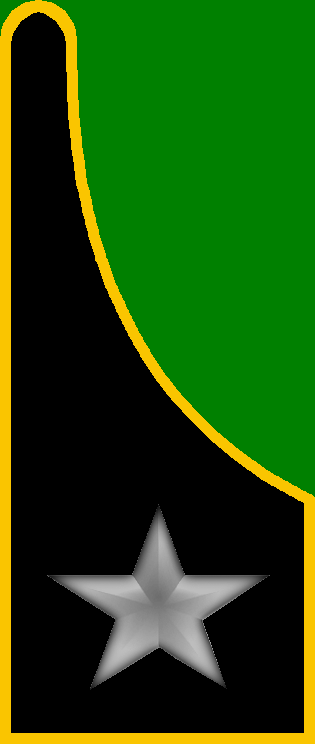
- Regimental gorget patches

The 5th Mountain Artillery Regiment (Italian: 5° Reggimento Artiglieria da Montagna) is an inactive mountain artillery regiment of the Italian Army, which was based in Meran in South Tyrol. The regiment was formed in 1935 by the Royal Italian Army with batteries that had served in World War I. The regiment was assigned to the 5th Alpine Division "Pusteria", with which it served in the Second Italo-Ethiopian War and during World War II in the invasion of France and the Greco-Italian War. After the invasion of Yugoslavia the regiment served as occupation force in Montenegro. In 1943 the regiment was transferred to the South of occupied France. After the announcement of the Armistice of Cassibile on 8 September 1943 the regiment was disbanded by invading German forces.

The regiment was reformed in 1953 and assigned to the Alpine Brigade "Orobica". In 1975 the regiment was split into two mountain artillery groups and its flag and traditions were assigned to the Mountain Artillery Group "Bergamo". In 1992 the regiment was reformed, but it was disbanded once more in 2001. The Italian mountain artillery has served since its inception alongside the infantry's Alpini speciality, with whom the mountain artillery shares the distinctive Cappello Alpino. The regimental anniversary falls, as for all Italian Army artillery regiments, on June 15, the beginning of the Second Battle of the Piave River in 1918.

== History ==
=== Second Italo-Ethiopian War ===
On 31 December 1935 the 5th Alpine Artillery Regiment "Pusteria" was formed by the depot of the 2nd Alpine Artillery Regiment "Tridentina" in Bergamo. The regiment was assigned to the 5th Alpine Division "Pusteria" and consisted of a command, a command unit, the Alpine Artillery Group "Belluno", with the batteries 1st, 11th, and 24th, and the Alpine Artillery Group "Lanzo", with the batteries 5th, 13th, and 21st. As the regiment had been formed in preparation for the planned Second Italo-Ethiopian War the regiment was cobbled together with parts from existing alpine artillery regiments:

- 5th Mountain Artillery Regiment, in Belluno
  - Command Unit (formed by the 2nd Alpine Artillery Regiment "Tridentina")
  - Alpine Artillery Group "Belluno"
    - Command Unit (ceded by the 3rd Alpine Artillery Regiment "Julia")
    - 1st Battery (ceded by the Group "Susa" of the 1st Alpine Artillery Regiment "Taurinense")
    - 11th Battery (ceded by the Group "Mondovì" of the 4th Alpine Artillery Regiment "Cuneense")
    - 24th Battery (part of the Group "Belluno")
  - Alpine Artillery Group "Lanzo"
    - Command Unit (formed by the 1st Alpine Artillery Regiment "Taurinense")
    - 5th Battery (ceded by the Group "Aosta" of the 1st Alpine Artillery Regiment "Taurinense")
    - 13th Battery (ceded by the Group "Conegliano" of the 3rd Alpine Artillery Regiment "Julia")
    - 21st Battery (ceded by the Group "Vicenza" of the 2nd Alpine Artillery Regiment "Tridentina")

All batteries were equipped with 75/13 mod. 15 mountain guns. The 5th Alpine Division "Pusteria", which also included the 7th Alpini Regiment and 11th Alpini Regiment, depart for East Africa departed from Livorno and Naples on 6 January 1936. The division played a crucial role in the Battle of Amba Aradam, fought in the Battle of Maychew and the Second Battle of Tembien. On 5 May 1936 the division entered the Ethiopian capital of Addis Ababa. After the war's conclusions the division remained in Ethiopia until April 1937 to subdue the remaining Ethiopian resistance. The division returned to Naples on 12 April 1937 and was given a triumph march through Rome the next day. Having distinguished itself in Ethiopia it was decided that the division would not be disbanded. For its conduct and bravery during the Battle of Maychew the Group "Belluno" was awarded a Bronze Medal of Military Valor.

The Group "Lanzo" had been disbanded on 12 April 1937, the day the division arrived back in Italy, but on 25 September of the same year the group was reformed with the batteries 16th (ceded by the Alpine Artillery Group "Udine") and 21st (ceded once again by the Alpine Artillery Group "Vicenza"). The same month the Alpine Artillery Group "Belluno" was reorganized and now consisted of its traditional batteries, the 22nd, 23rd, and 24th. In 1938 the regiment formed the 44th Battery for the Group "Lanzo" and on 27 August 1939 the regiment formed the Alpine Artillery Group "Val Piave", with the batteries 34th, 35th, and 39th.

=== World War II ===
On 10 June 1940, the day Italy entered World War II, the regiment consisted of a command, command unit, the Alpine Artillery Group "Belluno", the Alpine Artillery Group "Lanzo", and the Alpine Artillery Group "Val Piave". All three groups were equipped with 75/13 mod. 15 mountain guns. The regiment served in World War II with the 5th Alpine Division "Pusteria", which in June 1940 participated in the invasion of France. In November 1940 the division was sent to Albania for the Greco-Italian War. Between 6 December 1940 and 28 January 1941 the division was in constant combat with Greek Army units. On 5 March 1941 the Group "Val Piave" ceded its 34th Battery to the Group "Udine" of the 3rd Alpine Artillery Regiment "Julia" and in April of the same year the division participated in the Battle of Greece. After the invasion of Yugoslavia the Pusteria was sent to Montenegro, where it fought in the Battle of Pljevlja against Yugoslav Partisan. On 1 November 1941 the Group "Val Piave" was disbanded.

In December 1941 the Alpine Artillery Group "Val Piave" was reformed, with the batteries 35th, 36th, and 39th, and equipped with 105/11 mod. 28 mountain guns. The group was transferred in April 1942 to the 3rd Alpine Artillery Regiment "Julia" for that regiment's upcoming deployment to the Soviet Union. In August 1942, the 5th Alpine Division "Pusteria" was repatriated and, after two months of rest, participated in the Axis occupation of Vichy France. Afterwards the Pusteria took up garrison duties in occupied France. After the announcement of the Armistice of Cassibile on 8 September 1943 the division and its regiments were disbanded by invading German forces.

=== Cold War ===
On 1 July 1953 the 5th Mountain Artillery Regiment was reformed in Meran with the personnel of the disbanded 184th Field Artillery Regiment. The regiment was assigned to the Alpine Brigade "Orobica", which was tasked with defending the Vinschgau valley, and Passeier valley. On 13 August 1953 the 2nd Mountain Artillery Regiment ceded the 32nd Battery, which had been part of the Group "Bergamo", to the 5th Mountain Artillery Regiment to help reform the Group "Bergamo", which was reformed on 10 September 1953. On 1 September of the same year the 2nd Mountain Artillery Regiment transferred its recruits training group to the 5th Mountain Artillery Regiment, which afterwards consisted of a command, a command unit, the Group "Bergamo" with 75/13 mod. 15 mountain guns, the Mountain Artillery Group "Sondrio" with 100/17 mod. 14 howitzers, the Mountain Artillery Group "Vestone" with M30 107mm mortars, a light anti-aircraft group with 40/56 anti-aircraft autocannons, and the recruits training group. Initially only the Group "Bergamo" consisted of batteries with traditional mountain battery numbers, but on 15 March 1955 the army's General Staff ordered that also the groups with 100/17 mod. 14 howitzers and M30 107mm mortars should receive traditional mountain battery numbers. Consequently all the batteries of the regiment were renumbered and afterwards the regiment consisted of the following groups and batteries:

- 5th Mountain Artillery Regiment, in Meran
  - Command Unit
  - Mountain Artillery Group "Bergamo", in Schlanders
    - Command Unit
    - 31st and 32nd batteries with 75/13 mod. 15 mountain guns
  - Mountain Artillery Group "Sondrio", in Schlanders
    - Command Unit
    - 51st and 52nd batteries with 100/17 mod. 14 howitzers
  - Mountain Artillery Group "Vestone", in Meran
    - Command Unit
    - 35th, 36th, and 39th batteries with M30 107mm mortars
  - Light Anti-aircraft Group, in Meran
    - Command Unit
    - 1st, 2nd, and 3rd batteries with 40/56 anti-aircraft autocannons
  - Recruits Training Group, in Meran

The Mountain Artillery Group "Bergamo", named for the city of Bergamo at the Southern edge of the Orobic Alps, was formed 1910 in Bergamo and assigned to the 2nd Mountain Artillery Regiment. The group was equipped with 65/17 mod. 13 mountain guns and consisted of the 31st, 32nd, and 33rd batteries. On 1 February 1915 the group was assigned to the 3rd Mountain Artillery Regiment. In World War I the group fought in 1915 on the Krn and the Mrzli Vrh. In 1916–17 the group returned to the Krn and in 1918 it served on the Presena Glacier and on Monte Asolone. In 1926 the group returned to the 2nd Mountain Artillery Regiment, with which it moved in 1936 from Bergamo to Meran. In World War II the group served with the 2nd Alpine Artillery Regiment "Tridentina" in the Greco-Italian War and then in the Soviet Union, where the Italian Army in Russia was destroyed during the Soviet Operation Little Saturn. For their conduct and bravery on the Greek front the groups of the 2nd Alpine Artillery Regiment "Tridentina" were awarded a Bronze Medal of Military Valor, and for their conduct and sacrifice in the Soviet Union the groups were awarded a Gold Medal of Military Valor, both of which the Group "Bergamo" brought with it to the 5th Mountain Artillery Regiment. The two medal were affixed to the regiment's flag and are depicted on the regiment's coat of arms. After the announcement of the Armistice of Cassibile on 8 September 1943 the remnants of the Group "Bergamo" were disbanded by invading German forces.

The Mountain Artillery Group "Bergamo" was reformed on 1 April 1948 in Bolzano and assigned to the IV Territorial Military Command. The group was equipped with 75/13 mod. 15 mountain guns and consisted of the 31st, 32nd, and 33rd batteries. On 1 May 1951 the group was transferred to the reformed 2nd Mountain Artillery Regiment. On 13 August 1951 the group added the 35th Battery, but on 31 December 1952 the group was disbanded and its personnel and materiel used to reform the next day the Mountain Artillery Group "Vicenza".

The Mountain Artillery Group "Sondrio", named for the city of Sondrio at the Northern edge of the Orobic Alps, was formed for the first time in 1953 with the batteries, that had been part of the Alpine Artillery Group "Val d'Orco" in World War II. The Mountain Artillery Group "Vestone", named for the village of Vestone on the Eastern edge of the Orobic Alps, was formed for the first time in 1953 with batteries that had been part of the Alpine Artillery Group "Val Piave". The Group "Val Piave" had served with the 3rd Alpine Artillery Regiment "Julia" in the Soviet Union and been awarded, together with the other groups of the regiment, a Gold Medal of Military Valor.

On 31 October 1955 the Recruits Training Group was disbanded. On 10 October 1957 the Light Anti-aircraft Group was transferred to the 2nd Heavy Anti-aircraft Artillery Regiment. In 1956 the Group "Vestone" was equipped with Brandt AM-50 120mm mortars. In 1956–57 the regiment formed the 33rd Battery for the Group "Bergamo" and the 53rd Battery for the Group "Sondrio". In 1959 the regiment received 105/14 mod. 56 pack howitzers and each of the three groups now fielded two howitzer and one mortar battery. In 1963 the Group "Sondrio" moved from Schlanders to Sterzing.

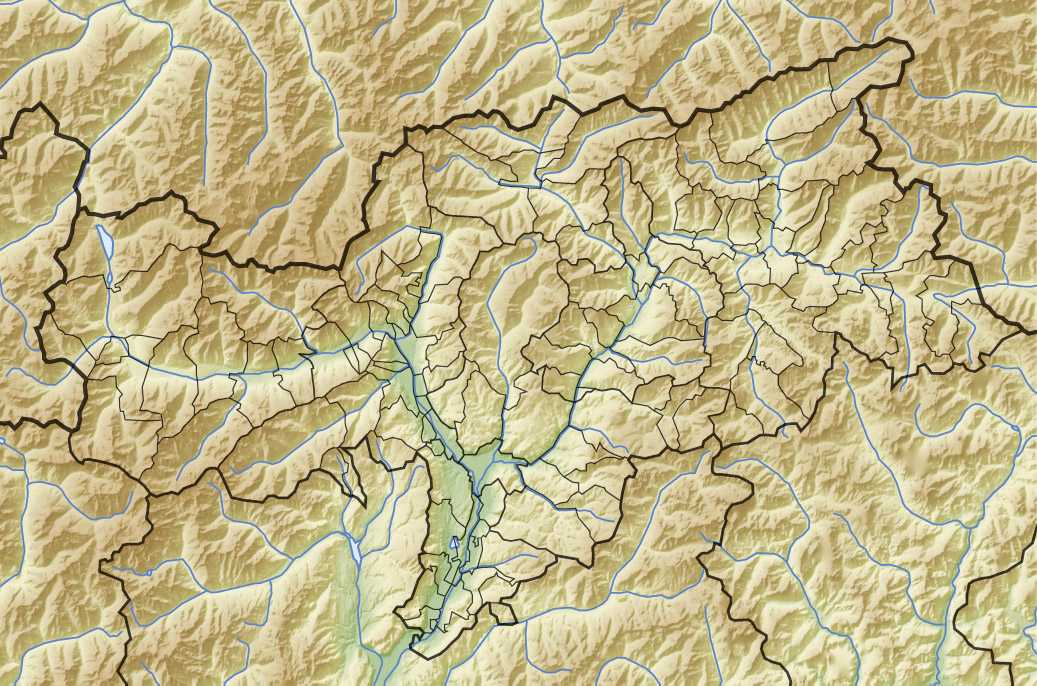
Location of the regiment and its groups in the South Tyrol at the end of 1964
- 5th Mountain Artillery Regiment, in Meran
  - Command Unit
  - Mountain Artillery Group "Bergamo", in Schlanders
    - Command Unit
    - 31st Battery, with 105/14 mod. 56 pack howitzers
    - 32nd Battery, with 105/14 mod. 56 pack howitzers
    - 33rd Battery, with Brandt AM-50 120mm mortars
  - Mountain Artillery Group "Sondrio", in Sterzing
    - Command Unit
    - 51st Battery, with 105/14 mod. 56 pack howitzers
    - 52nd Battery, with 105/14 mod. 56 pack howitzers
    - 53rd Battery, with Brandt AM-50 120mm mortars
  - Mountain Artillery Group "Vestone", in Meran
    - Command Unit
    - 35th Battery, with 105/14 mod. 56 pack howitzers
    - 36th Battery, with 105/14 mod. 56 pack howitzers
    - 39th Battery, with Brandt AM-50 120mm mortars

In 1970 the regiment's mortar batteries were equipped with 105/14 mod. 56 pack howitzers.

During the 1975 army reform the army disbanded the regimental level and newly independent battalions and groups were granted for the first time their own flags. On 10 September 1975 the Group "Vestone" was disbanded. On 30 September the 5th Mountain Artillery Regiment was disbanded and the next day the Mountain Artillery Group "Sondrio" in Sterzing and the Mountain Artillery Group "Bergamo" in Schlanders became autonomous units. Both groups were assigned to the Alpine Brigade "Orobica" and consisted of a command, a command and services battery, and three batteries with 105/14 mod. 56 pack howitzers, with one of the batteries being mule-carried. At the time each of the two groups fielded 610 men (35 officers, 55 non-commissioned officers, and 520 soldiers).

On 12 November 1976 the President of the Italian Republic Giovanni Leone issued decree 846, which assigned the flag and traditions of the 5th Mountain Artillery Regiment to the Mountain Artillery Group "Bergamo", and granted the Mountain Artillery Group "Sondrio" a new flag. On 26 September 1982 the Mountain Artillery Group "Sondrio" was equipped with M114 155mm howitzers.

=== Recent times ===
After the end of the Cold War the Italian Army began to draw down its forces. On 24 October 1989 the 53rd Battery and the Command and Services Battery of the Mountain Artillery Group "Sondrio" were disbanded, while the 51st and 52nd batteries were transferred to the Mountain Artillery Group "Bergamo". On 26 October of the same year the flag of the Mountain Artillery Group "Sondrio" was transferred to the Shrine of the Flags in the Vittoriano in Rome. One year later the 52nd Battery was disbanded and the 51st Battery was reorganized as a self-defense anti-aircraft battery, which was equipped with Stinger man-portable air-defense systems. On 30 July 1991 the Mountain Artillery Group "Bergamo" was transferred to the Alpine Brigade "Tridentina". On 31 July 1992 the Mountain Artillery Group "Bergamo" lost its autonomy and the next day the group entered the reformed 5th Mountain Artillery Regiment. The regiment consisted of the following units:

- 5th Mountain Artillery Regiment, in Schlanders
  - Command and Services Battery
  - 51st Self-defense Anti-aircraft Battery, with Stinger man-portable air-defense systems
  - Group "Bergamo"
    - 31st Battery, with 105/14 mod. 56 pack howitzers
    - 32nd Battery, with 105/14 mod. 56 pack howitzers
    - 33rd Battery, with 105/14 mod. 56 pack howitzers

On 6 November 1995 the regiment moved from Schlanders to Meran. On 15 May 2001 the regiment was disbanded and the flag of the 5th Mountain Artillery Regiment was transferred to the Shrine of the Flags in the Vittoriano in Rome.
