= Mountain Artillery Group "Belluno" =

Inactive Italian Army mountain artillery unit

- Gruppo Artiglieria da Montagna "Belluno"
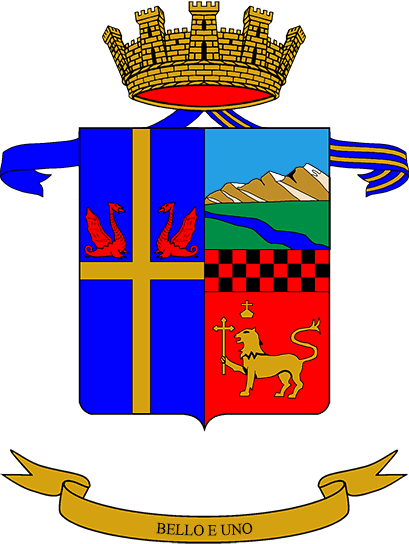
- Regimental coat of arms
- Active: 1 Oct. 1975 – 31 Oct. 1989
- Country: Italy
- Branch: Italian Army
- Part of: Alpine Brigade "Julia"
- Garrison/HQ: Pontebba
- Motto(s): "Bello e uno"
- Anniversaries: 15 June 1918 – Second Battle of the Piave River
- Decorations: 1× Bronze Medal of Military Valor; 1× Bronze Medal of Army Valor

Insignia
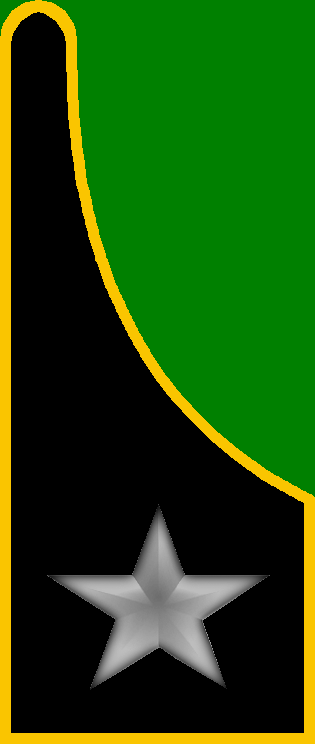
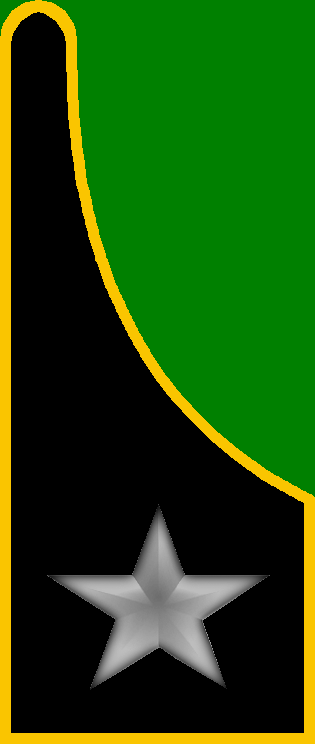
- Regimental gorget patches

The Mountain Artillery Group "Belluno" (Italian: Gruppo Artiglieria da Montagna "Belluno") is an inactive mountain artillery group of the Italian Army, which was based in Pontebba in Friuli-Venezia Giulia. The group was formed on 1 October 1909 by the Royal Italian Army's 2nd Mountain Artillery Regiment and served with the regiment during World War I on the Italian front. In World War II the group was assigned to the 5th Alpine Artillery Regiment "Pusteria", with which it participated in the invasion of France and the Greco-Italian War.

The group was reformed in 1947 and assigned in 1951 to the 3rd Mountain Artillery Regiment of the Alpine Brigade "Julia". In 1975 the group became an autonomous unit and was granted a flag and coat of arms. After the end of the Cold War the group was disbanded in 1989. The Italian mountain artillery has served since its inception alongside the infantry's Alpini speciality, with whom the mountain artillery shares the distinctive Cappello Alpino. The regimental anniversary falls, as for all Italian Army artillery units, on June 15, the beginning of the Second Battle of the Piave River in 1918.

== History ==
On 1 October 1909 the 2nd Mountain Artillery Regiment was formed in Vicenza and on the same date the IV Brigade was formed in Belluno for the regiment. The new brigade consisted of the 22nd, 23rd, and 24th mountain batteries, which were equipped with 70A mountain guns. On 17 July 1910 the brigades of the Royal Italian Army's two mountain artillery regiments were redesignated as groups and dropped their numbers. Consequently, the IV Brigade was renamed Mountain Artillery Group "Belluno".

During the Italo-Turkish War in 1911–12 the group's 23rd Battery was assigned to the Mountain Artillery Group "Vicenza", which was sent to Libya. In May 1912 the 23rd Battery participated in the Italian operation to seize the island of Rhodes. In 1913 the batteries received 65/17 mod. 13 mountain guns.

=== World War I ===
At the outbreak of World War I the 2nd Mountain Artillery Regiment formed the 58th Battery for the group, which entered the war with the following organization:

- (VIII) Mountain Artillery Group "Belluno"
  - 22nd Mountain Artillery Battery
  - 23rd Mountain Artillery Battery
  - 24th Mountain Artillery Battery
  - 58th Mountain Artillery Battery

During the war the 2nd Mountain Artillery Regiment was broken up and its groups and batteries attached to different Alpini units. The Mountain Artillery Group "Belluno" was in 1915–16 deployed at the Tre Cime di Lavaredo, on Monte Piana, in the Sexten valley, and at the Kreuzberg Pass. In 1916 the group remained in the Dolomites and was deployed towards the Passo della Sentinella. In 1917 the group was on the Cima Forame, then returned to Monte Piana. During the same year the group was at the Stretta di Quero and on Monte Solarolo. In 1918 the group was in the Val Calcino and then on Monte Grappa.

=== Interwar years ===
After the war the group was equipped with 75/13 mod. 15 mountain guns. On 11 March 1926 the Royal Italian Army reorganized its artillery. As Alpini units were traditionally numbered from West to East the army decided that the 2nd Mountain Artillery Regiment and 3rd Mountain Artillery Regiment should swap numbers. After the two regiment swapped numbers the Mountain Artillery Group "Belluno" was assigned to the new 2nd Mountain Artillery Regiment. In November 1929 the Group "Belluno" returned to its traditional regiment, which was now designated 3rd Mountain Artillery Regiment.

On 31 December 1935 the Group "Belluno" was transferred to the newly formed 5th Alpine Artillery Regiment "Pusteria", with which the group participated in the Second Italo-Ethiopian War with the following organization:

- Alpine Artillery Group "Belluno"
  - Command Unit
  - 1st Battery (transferred temporarily by the Group "Susa" of the 1st Alpine Artillery Regiment "Taurinense")
  - 11th Battery (transferred temporarily by the Group "Mondovì" of the 4th Alpine Artillery Regiment "Cuneense")
  - 24th Battery

For its conduct and bravery during the Battle of Maychew the Group "Belluno" was awarded a Bronze Medal of Military Valor, which was affixed to the regiment's flag and is depicted on the group's coat of arms.

=== World War II ===
On 10 June 1940, the day Italy entered World War II, the Alpine Artillery Group "Belluno", with the 22nd, 23rd, and 24th batteries, was assigned to the 5th Alpine Artillery Regiment "Pusteria" of the 5th Alpine Division "Pusteria". All three batteries were equipped with 75/13 mod. 15 mountain guns. In June 1940 the regiment participated in the invasion of France and in November 1940 it was sent to Albania for the Greco-Italian War. In April 1941 the regiment participated in the Battle of Greece and after the invasion of Yugoslavia the regiment was sent to Montenegro, where it fought in the Battle of Pljevlja against Yugoslav Partisan.

In August 1942, the 5th Alpine Artillery Regiment "Pusteria" participated in the Axis occupation of Vichy France. Afterwards the regiment took up garrison duties in occupied France. After the announcement of the Armistice of Cassibile on 8 September 1943 the regiment and its groups were disbanded by invading German forces.

=== Cold War ===
On 22 August 1947 the 184th Artillery Regiment "Folgore" reformed the Mountain Artillery Group "Belluno" as the first mountain artillery group to be reformed after World War II. The group was based in Belluno and consisted of the 22nd, 23rd, and 24th batteries, which were equipped with 75/13 mod. 15 mountain guns. On 1 March 1948 the group was transferred to the I Territorial Military Command. On 15 October 1949 the group entered the newly formed Alpine Brigade "Julia". On 1 November 1950 the group reformed the 25th Battery 75/13 mod. 15 mountain guns. On 1 February 1951 the 3rd Mountain Artillery Regiment was reformed in Udine and assigned to the Alpine Brigade "Julia" and the Group "Belluno" was assigned to the regiment.

In the course of the year 1952 the Group "Belluno" moved from Belluno to Pontebba and the following year from Pontebba to Tolmezzo. In 1953 the group had the following organization:

- Mountain Artillery Group "Belluno", in Tolmezzo
  - Command Unit
  - 22nd Battery, with 75/13 mod. 15 mountain guns
  - 22nd Battery, with 75/13 mod. 15 mountain guns
  - 24th Battery, with 75/13 mod. 15 mountain guns
  - 25th Battery, with 75/13 mod. 15 mountain guns

In 1959 the Group "Belluno" received 105/14 mod. 56 pack howitzers. The following year the groups of the 3rd Mountain Artillery Regiment were reorganized and on 1 September 1960 the Group "Belluno" transferred its 25th Battery with 105/14 mod. 56 pack howitzers to the Group "Conegliano". At the same time the Brandt AM-50 120mm mortars of the Group "Udine" were distributed among the three groups, which afterwards fielded two howitzer, respectively in the case of the Group "Conegliano" three howitzer batteries, and one mortar battery. In 1964 the Group "Belluno" moved from Tolmezzo to Tarvisio.

- Mountain Artillery Group "Belluno", in Tarvisio
  - Command Unit
  - 22nd Battery, with 105/14 mod. 56 pack howitzers
  - 22nd Battery, with 105/14 mod. 56 pack howitzers
  - 24th Battery, with Brandt AM-50 120mm mortars

During the 1975 army reform the army disbanded the regimental level and newly independent battalions and groups were granted for the first time their own flags. On 31 August 1975 the Group "Belluno" was disbanded, but already on 5 September the Group "Osoppo" in Pontebba was renamed Mountain Artillery Group "Belluno". On 30 September 1975 the 3rd Mountain Artillery Regiment was disbanded and the next day its remaining three groups became autonomous units and were assigned to the Alpine Brigade "Julia". The groups consisted of a command, a command and services battery, and three batteries with 105/14 mod. 56 pack howitzers, with one of the batteries being mule-carried. At the time each of the three groups fielded 610 men (35 officers, 55 non-commissioned officers, and 520 soldiers).

On 12 November 1976 the President of the Italian Republic Giovanni Leone issued decree 846, which assigned the flag and traditions of the 3rd Mountain Artillery Regiment to the Mountain Artillery Group "Conegliano". With the same decree the Mountain Artillery Group "Belluno" and Mountain Artillery Group "Udine" were both granted a new flag. For its conduct and work after the 1976 Friuli earthquake the Mountain Artillery Group "Belluno" was awarded a Bronze Medal of Army Valor, which was affixed to the group's war flag and added to the group's coat of arms. The same year the group moved from Gemona to Udine.

=== Recent times ===
After the end of the Cold War the Italian Army began to draw down its forces. On 31 October 1989 the 22nd Battery and the Command and Services Battery of the Mountain Artillery Group "Belluno" were disbanded, while the 23rd and 24th batteries were transferred to the Mountain Artillery Group "Udine". On 9 November of the same year the flag of the Mountain Artillery Group "Belluno" was transferred to the Shrine of the Flags in the Vittoriano in Rome. As of 2023 the traditions of the Mountain Artillery Group "Belluno" are carried on by the 24th Surveillance, Target Acquisition and Tactical Liaison Battery of the 3rd Field Artillery Regiment (Mountain).
