= 7.5 cm Pak 97/38 =

7.5 cm Panzerabwehrkanone 97/38
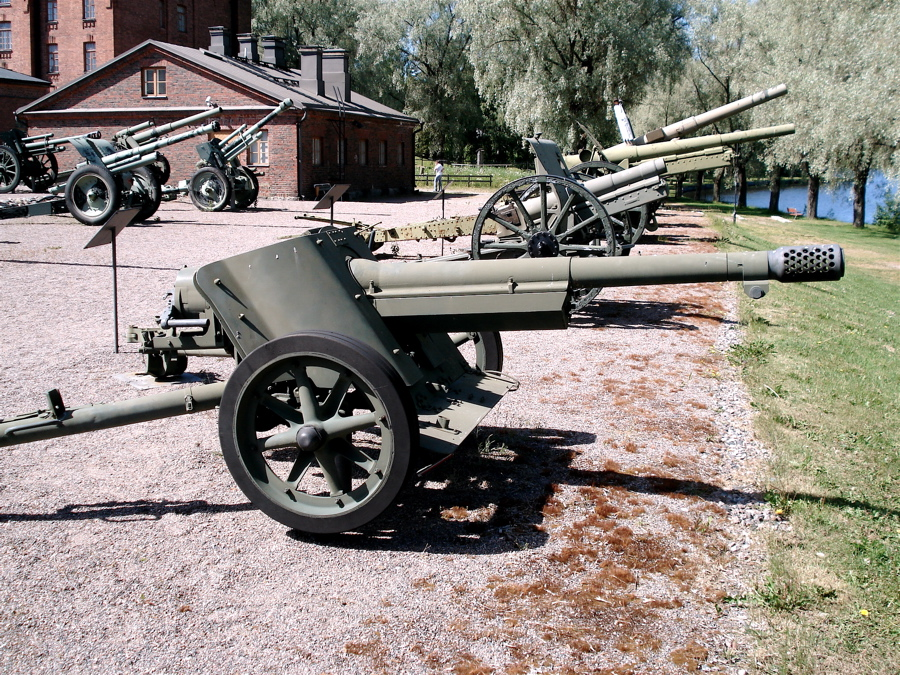
- Pak 97/38 displayed in The Artillery Museum of Finland, Hämeenlinna.
- Type: anti-tank gun
- Place of origin: Nazi Germany, France

Service history
- In service: 1942–1945
- Used by: Nazi Germany; Finland; Italy; Romania; Bulgaria; Hungary
- Wars: World War II

Production history
- Designer: Albert Deport, Etienne Sainte-Claire Deville, and Emile Rimailho.
- Designed: 1897
- Produced: 1942–1943
- No. built: 3,712

Specifications
- Mass: combat: 1,190 kg (2,623 lbs) travel: 1,270 kg (2,800 lbs)
- Length: 4.65 m (15 ft 3 in)
- Barrel length: 2.58 m (8 ft 6 in) L/34.5; 2.72 m (8 ft 11 in) L/36.3 (without muzzle brake)
- Width: 1.85 m (6 ft 1 in)
- Height: 1.05 m (3 ft 5 in)
- Shell: 75×350 mm R HE, HEAT, Shrapnel, armor-piercing
- Caliber: 75 mm (2.95 in)
- Breech: Nordenfelt interrupted screw
- Recoil: Hydro-pneumatic
- Carriage: Split trail
- Elevation: -10° to 18°
- Traverse: 60°
- Rate of fire: 10-14 rpm
- Muzzle velocity: 570 m/s (1,900 ft/s)

The Pak 97/38 (7.5 cm Panzerabwehrkanone 97/38 and 7,5 cm Panzerjägerkanone 97/38) was a German anti-tank gun used by the Wehrmacht in World War II. The gun was a combination of the barrel from the French Canon de 75 modèle 1897 fitted with a Swiss Solothurn muzzle brake and mounted on the carriage of the German 5 cm Pak 38 and could fire captured French and Polish ammunition.

Together with light weight, good mobility and sufficient anti-armor performance with a HEAT shell (enough to penetrate T-34s in most situations; the side armor of the KV series could also be pierced), it made the gun a decent anti-tank weapon. It had shortcomings, particularly its low muzzle velocity. Although this did not affect the armor-piercing characteristics of its HEAT ammunition, it meant insufficient performance when firing regular AP shells and - because of difficulties in hitting small mobile targets - its low effective range of about 500 m even with HEAT. The gun also had a quite violent recoil, especially with AP shells.

== Development history ==
During the invasion of Poland and invasion of France the Wehrmacht captured thousands of 75 mm Model 1897 guns, built by the French arms manufacturer Schneider. These guns were adopted by the Germans as the FK 97(p)(7,5) and the 7.5 cm FK 231(f) and used in their original field artillery role.

Soon after the German invasion of the USSR in 1941, Wehrmacht units encountered new Soviet tanks, the medium T-34 and the heavy KV. The thick and/or sloped armor of these vehicles gave them invulnerability against German towed 3.7 cm Pak 36 anti-tank guns. The situation led to requests for more powerful weapons that would be able to destroy them at normal combat ranges. Since Germany already had a suitable design, the 7.5 cm Pak 40, this weapon entered production and the first pieces were delivered in November 1941. However, until enough of these were manufactured, some expedient solution was required.

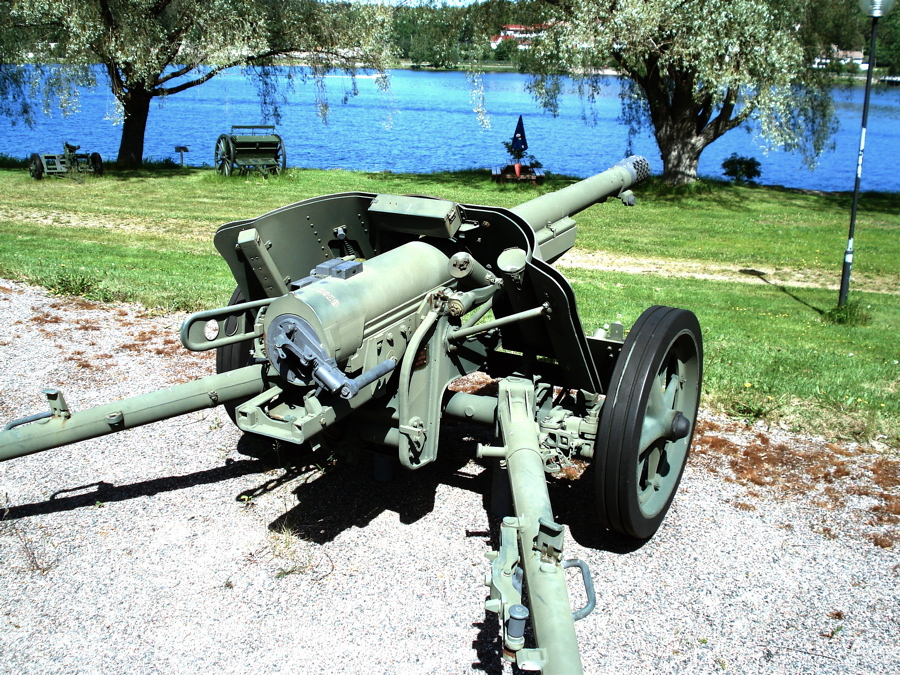
Pak 97/38 in Hämeenlinna Museo Militaria

External images
- Romanian Pak 97/38 battery in Crimea in December 1943.
- 7.5 cm Pak 97/38(f) auf Pz.740(r).

It was tempting to adopt the readily available French gun to the anti-tank role. In the original configuration, those guns were ill-suited for fighting tanks because of their relatively low muzzle velocity, limited traverse (only 6°), and lack of a suitable suspension (which resulted in a transport speed of just 10–12 km/h). It was decided to solve the traverse and mobility problems by mounting the 75 mm barrel on the modern split trail carriage of the 5 cm Pak 38 anti-tank gun. To soften the recoil, the barrel was fitted with a large muzzle brake. The gun was primarily intended to use HEAT shells as the armor penetration of this type of ammunition does not depend on velocity.

Another major user of the French gun, the US Army, created and briefly adopted a similar suitable design, known as the 75mm anti-tank gun on carriage M2A3.

== Production ==
2,854 pieces were delivered in 1942; 858 more followed in 1943. In addition, 160 guns mounted on the 7.5 cm Pak 40 carriage (Pak 97/40) were built in 1943. The manufacturing cost of one piece was 9,000 reichsmarks, compared to 12,000 for the Pak 40. Production was stopped because more powerful anti-tank guns were in service in adequate numbers.

Production of ammunition for Pak 97/38 and Pak 97/40, thousands
Type	1942	1943	1944	1945	Total
HL.Gr. (HEAT)	929.4	1,388.0	264.5	0	2,581.9
Sprgr. (HE-Frag)	769.4	1,071.3	957.7	14.3	?
Pzgr. (Armor-piercing)	359.4	597.3	437.3	0	?

== Employment ==
The Pak 97/38 reached the battlefield in the summer of 1942. Despite moderate effectiveness and a violent recoil, it remained in service until the end of the war. The scale of use can be illustrated by the ammunition used: 37,800 HEAT shells in 1942 and 371,600 in 1943. On 1 March 1945 the Wehrmacht possessed 145 Pak 97/38 and FK 231(f) guns, although only 14 were employed by frontline units.

Ten barrels with shields were experimentally mounted on the Soviet T-26 light tank chassis, resulting in vehicles designated the 7.5 cm Pak 97/38(f) auf Pz.740(r). These self-propelled guns served with the 3rd Company of the 563rd Anti-Tank Battalion before being replaced by the Marder III on 1 March 1944.

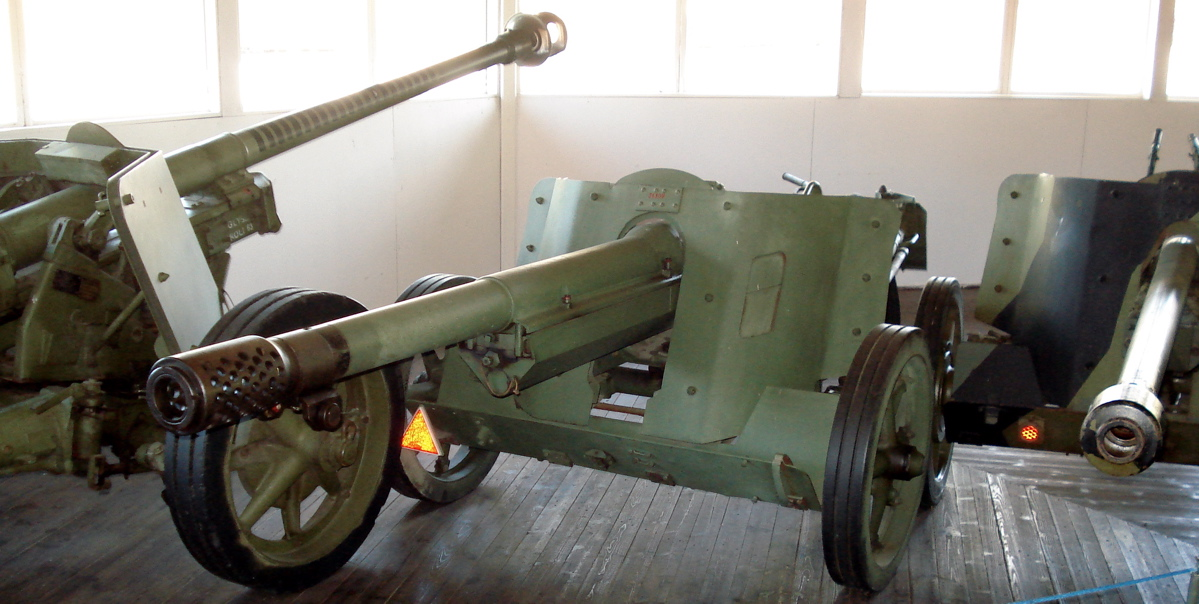
Pak 97/38 in Finnish Tank Museum (Panssarimuseo) in Parola

The gun was also employed by the Finnish Army during the Continuation War. The Finns purchased 75 mm field guns from France in 1940, but were disappointed with their performance and in 1943, they reached an agreement with Germany about upgrading them to Pak 97/38 standards. 46 pieces were converted in March–June 1943. Seven of the guns were lost in combat, the rest remained in service after the war and were only retired in 1986.

Five or six guns were supplied to the infantry divisions of the Romanian Third and Fourth Armies in October 1942.

Nine divisions of the Italian 8th Army had an anti-tank battery of six guns assigned to its artillery regiment in 1942. The Italian designation was Cannone da 75/39.

By November 1942, the Hungarian 2nd Army fielded 43 Pak 97/38s.

== Ammunition ==
It is not clear if German AP shells for the Pak 97/38 were produced. Polish AP ammunition was also used in limited numbers.

The Finnish Army used locally produced shells designated 75 psa - Vj4 and possibly old French ones designated 75 pspkrv 59/66-ps. The 75 psa - Vj4 penetrated 92 mm at 300 m, with an impact angle of 90°.

Available ammunition
Type	Model	Weight	HE weight	Muzzle velocity	Range
Armor-piercing shells
AP, Polish	7.5 cm K.Gr. Pz.(p)	6.8 kg (15 lb)		570 m/s (1,900 ft/s)	1.5 km (0.93 mi)
HEAT shells
HEAT	7.5 cm Gr.38/97Hl/A(f)	4.4 kg (9 lb 11 oz)			
HEAT	7.5 cm Gr.38/97Hl/B(f)	4.57 kg (10 lb 1 oz)		450 m/s (1,500 ft/s)	1.5 km (0.93 mi)
HEAT	7.5 cm Gr.15/38Hl/B(f)	4.4 kg (9 lb 11 oz)			
High-explosive and fragmentation shells
HE-Frag, French	7.5 cm Sprgr.233/1(f)	6.19 kg (13 lb 10 oz)		577 m/s (1,890 ft/s)	10 km (6.2 mi)
HE-Frag, French	7.5 cm Sprgr.230/1(f)	5.44 kg (12 lb 0 oz)		545 m/s (1,790 ft/s)	7.6 km (4.7 mi)
HE-Frag, French	7.5 cm Sprgr.231/1(f)	5.44 kg (12 lb 0 oz)		557 m/s (1,830 ft/s)	7.6 km (4.7 mi)
HE-Frag, French	7.5 cm Sprgr.236/1(f)	6.6 kg (14 lb 9 oz)			10 km (6.2 mi)

== Performance ==
Estimated penetration
	100 m (110 yd)	500 m (550 yd)	1,000 m (1,100 yd)	1,500 m (1,600 yd)	2,000 m (2,200 yd)
AP	97 mm (3.8 in)	82 mm (3.2 in)	66 mm (2.6 in)	53 mm (2.1 in)	43 mm (1.7 in)
HEAT *	90 mm (3.5 in) at 90°or 75 mm (3.0 in) at 60°				

* Since HEAT projectiles do not rely on velocity to achieve penetration, their performance stays relatively uniform regardless of range. However, their accuracy at long range suffers.

== See also ==
- Canon de 75 modèle 1897 modifié 1938 – modernized for motor traction
- 75 mm field gun M1897 on M2 carriage – 1897 barrel on a new split trail carriage
