= M30 mortar =

M30
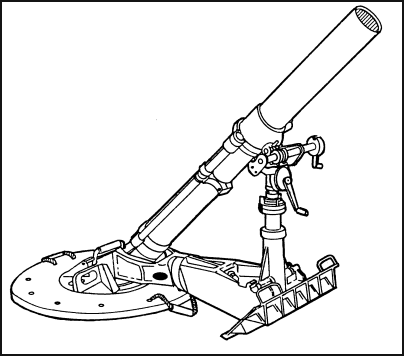
- Type: Mortar
- Place of origin: United States

Service history
- In service: 1951–Present
- Used by: See Users
- Wars: Korean War; Cambodian Civil War; Laotian Civil War; Vietnam War; Portuguese Colonial War; Third Indochina War; Sino-Vietnamese War; Lebanese Civil War; Guatemalan Civil War; Gulf War

Production history
- Designer: U.S. Chemical Warfare Service

Specifications
- Mass: 305 kg (672.25 lb)
- Length: 1.524 m (5 ft)
- Caliber: 106.7 mm (4.2 in)
- Rate of fire: 18 rpm max., 3 rpm sustained
- Effective firing range: 770 m to 6,840 m (840 yd to 7,480 yd)
- Maximum firing range: 6,840 m (7,480 yd)

The M30 106.7 mm (4.2 inch, or "Four-deuce") heavy mortar is an American rifled, muzzle-loading, high-angle-of-fire weapon used for long-range indirect fire support to infantry units.

== Design ==
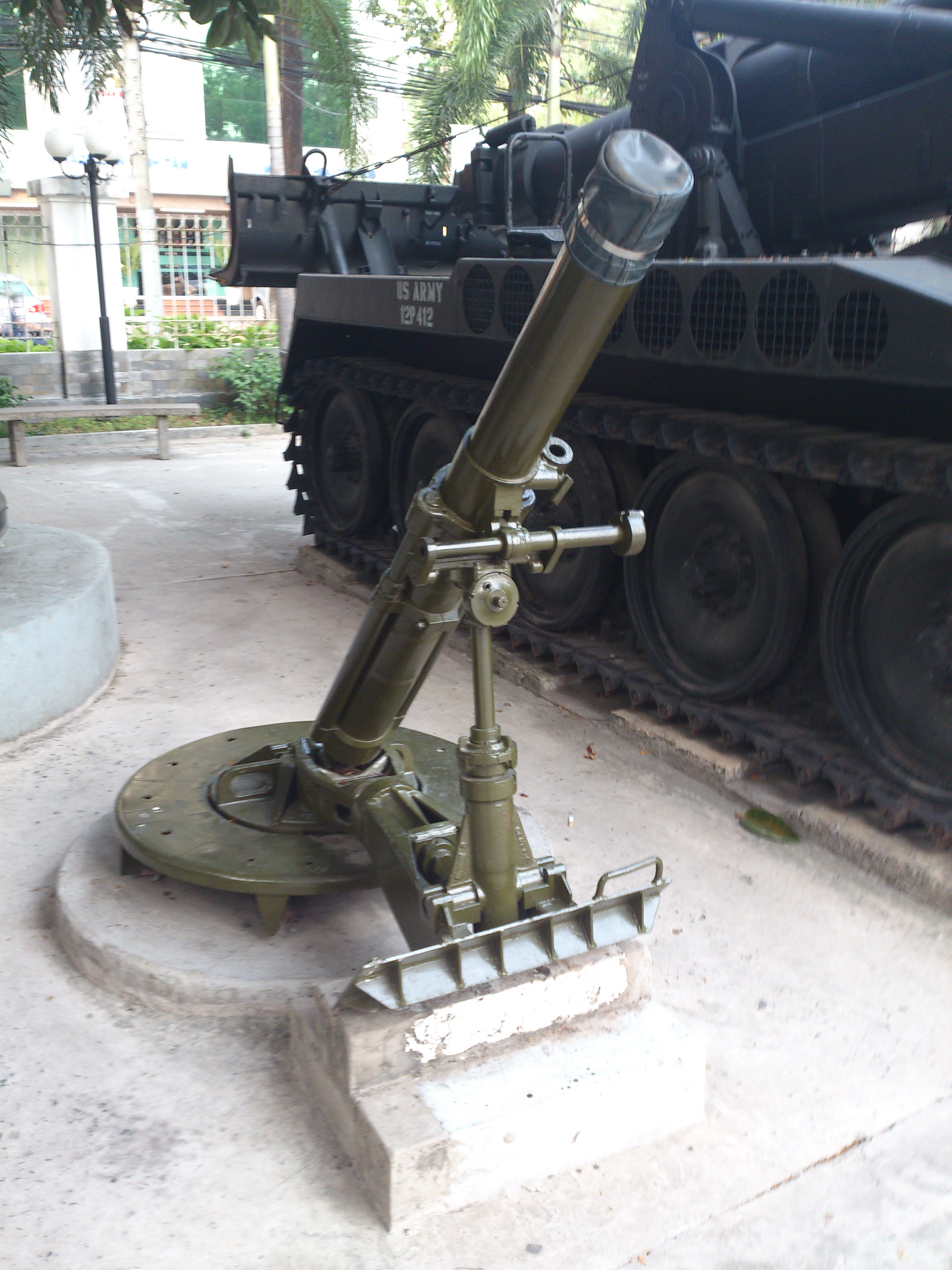
In the War Remnants Museum

The M30 system weighs 305 kilograms (672 lb) including the complete mortar with a welded steel rotator, M24A1 base plate, and M53 sight.

A point of interest in the design of this mortar is the rifled barrel. A rifled barrel requires the round to be a very tight fit to the bore in order for the rifling to engage the round and impart rotation to it. But, in a muzzle-loading mortar, the round has to be loose enough in the bore to drop in from the front. In order to have it both ways, these rounds have an expandable ring at the base, which expands into the rifling under the pressure of the firing charge that propels the round. Additionally, imparting a spin to a round causes it to drift away from the direction of fire during flight and the longer the flight (greater range to target), the farther the drift, so the computation for setting the direction for firing at a specific target has to account for this drift.

American rounds are designed to be both drop-safe and bore-safe. That is, the fuzes in the rounds for this rifled mortar are only armed once the round had spun a certain number of times, meaning that the round is not armed until it has exited the barrel spinning and has traveled a safe distance from the mortar emplacement.

=== Types of rounds ===
- HE M329A1—max range 5,650 metres (6,180 yd), weight 27.07 pounds (12.28 kg)
- HE M329A2—max range 6,840 metres (7,480 yd), weight 22 pounds (10.0 kg)
- WP M328A1—max range 5,650 metres (6,180 yd)
- ILLUM M335A1—max range 5,290 metres (5,790 yd), 70-second burn time @ 500,000 candlepower
- ILLUM M335A2—max range 5,490 metres (6,000 yd), 90-second burn time @ 850,000 candlepower

ILLUM is illumination, a parachute flare round with fixed timed detonation. Deployment height above ground is determined by gun elevation angle and propelling charge.

HE (high-explosive) and WP (white phosphorus) rounds could be fitted with various fuses before firing, including a proximity fuse set for detonation at about 30 ft (9.1 m) above ground to maximize the affected target area and to spray shrapnel down into foxholes.

There was also a sub-caliber training device that utilized blank 20-gauge shotgun shells to propel an inert training round several hundred meters. This training was for the gunnery skill of laying (in a sense, aiming) the guns. This device had originally been developed during WWII for the M2 mortar.

== History ==
The M30 entered service with the U.S. Army in 1951, replacing the previous M2 106.7 mm mortar. It was adopted due to the extended range and lethality in comparison to the previous M2 mortar, although the M30, at 305 kilograms (672 lb), was significantly heavier than the 151 kilograms (333 lb) M2.

Due to this heavy weight, the mortar was most often mounted in a tracked mortar carrier of the M113 family, designated as the M106 mortar carrier. This vehicle mounted mortar was crewed by five people: the track commander (mortar sergeant/gun commander), gunner, assistant gunner, ammunition bearer and vehicle driver. Ground mounting of the mortar was time consuming and strenuous as a hole had to be dug for the base plate of the mortar to rest in, sandbags had to filled and placed around the base plate to stabilize it and to protect the exposed ammunition. Also, this decreased the accuracy of the weapon as the recoil from firing caused the base plate to shift in the ground. This movement also made the crew have to "lay" the gun back on the aiming stakes more often, causing a temporary lack of fire while the weapon was repositioned and re-sighted back to its original reference point.

During the Vietnam War, both the US Marine Corps and the US Army deployed the M30 mortar. The USMC mounted the M30 mortar on the carriage of the M116 howitzer, this assembly being known as the M98 Howtar. The Saudi Arabian Army deployed the M30 in 1990-1991 during the Gulf War. The M30 was also used in Bosnia during Operation Joint Endeavor in 1996.

== Users ==
- Austria
- Belgium
- Bolivia
- Brazil
- Cambodia
- Canada
- Colombia
- Democratic Republic of the Congo
- Cyprus: less than 20 as of 2016
- Dominican Republic: 4 as of 2016
- Ecuador
- Ethiopia
- Greece: 620 (including 231 on vehicles) in service in the Hellenic Army as of 2016
- Guatemala: 12 from Israel, in store as of 2016
- Iran
- Israel: 50 as of 2016
- Italy
- Japan
- Jordan
- Republic of Korea
- Kuwait: 6 as of 2016
- Lebanon
- Liberia
- Libya
- Mexico
- Nepal
- Netherlands
- Norway
- Oman: 20 as of 2016
- Paraguay
- Philippines: 40 in the Philippine Army and some in the Philippine Marine Corps as of 2016
- Portugal: 30 (including 20 on vehicles) in service as of 2016
- Saudi Arabia: ~150 in service with the Saudi Arabian Army as of 2016, some used on vehicles
- Taiwan
- Tunisia
- Turkey: 1,264 as of 2016
- United States: US Army and US National Guard
- Uruguay

Former Operators

- South Vietnam

== See also ==
- Chemical mortar battalions of the United States Army
- List of artillery
- List of crew served weapons of the US Armed Forces
- List of weapons of the Laotian Civil War
- List of weapons of the Lebanese Civil War
