= Paolo Tarnassi =

Italian general (1890–1942)

Paolo Tarnassi

Paolo Tarnassi (29 October 1890, in Santa Maria Capua Vetere – 20 December 1942, in Mitrofanovka) was an Italian General during World War II.

He attended the Liceo Galvani in Bologna. In 1910 he was appointed as a career lieutenant in the cavalry of the Italian Army; he fought in the Italo-Turkish War, the First World War and the Second Italo-Ethiopian War.

He was promoted to lieutenant colonel in 1934 and to colonel in 1939, assuming command of the 13th Cavalry Regiment Cavalleggeri di Monferrato in the same year. From December 1941 to April 1942 he was attached to the II Army Corps, after which he was briefly attached to the Alessandria Army Corps. In June 1942 he was once again attached to the II Army Corps, now operating on the Eastern Front as part of the Italian Army in Russia (ARMIR); in July he was promoted to brigadier general, and in August he was made commander of the Kantemirovka military district, being also entrusted with enforcing discipline and security in the rear of the II Army Corps and supervising operations by the military police. He was later accused of war crimes for the execution of civilians in the area under his control. The name of General Paolo Tarnassi appears among those who were discharged (referred to at the time as ‘discriminated’ — Italian discriminati — as opposed to those deferred (deferiti) or suspended (sospesi)), meaning that he was officially declared exempt from criminal or administrative responsibility by the Commission of Inquiry into Alleged Italian War Criminals[5.]. In this historical and legal context, ‘to discriminate’ referred specifically to the act of distinguishing individuals who were not to be held accountable for alleged offences, thereby exempting them from further prosecution (Treccani definition of discriminare https://www.treccani.it/vocabolario/discriminare/). Although he was later accused of war crimes related to the execution of civilians in areas under his control, the official inquiry cleared him of any criminal responsibility.

On 20 December 1942, during Operation Little Saturn, he was killed by a Soviet air raid in Mitrofanovka.
