= 156th Infantry Division "Vicenza" =

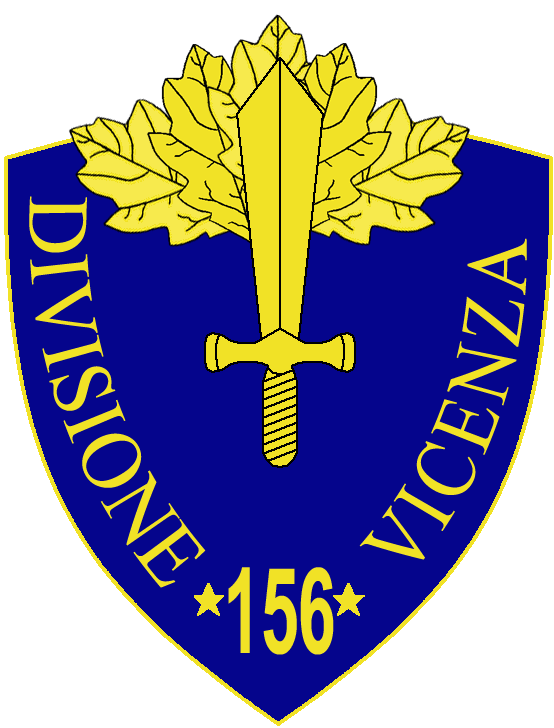
- 156th Infantry Division "Vicenza" insignia
- Active: 10 March 1942 - 15 May 1943
- Country: Kingdom of Italy
- Branch: Royal Italian Army
- Type: Infantry
- Size: Division
- Engagements: World War II

Commanders
- Notable commanders: Etelvoldo Pascolini

Insignia
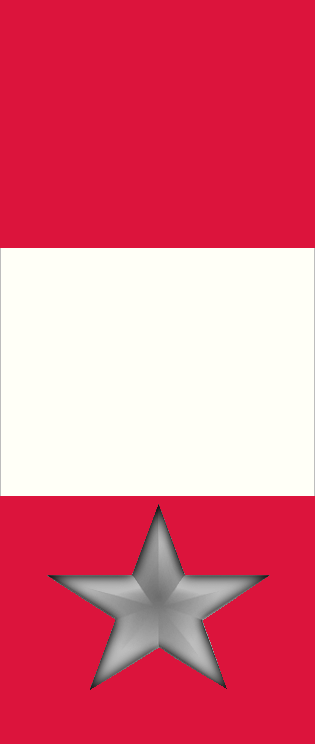
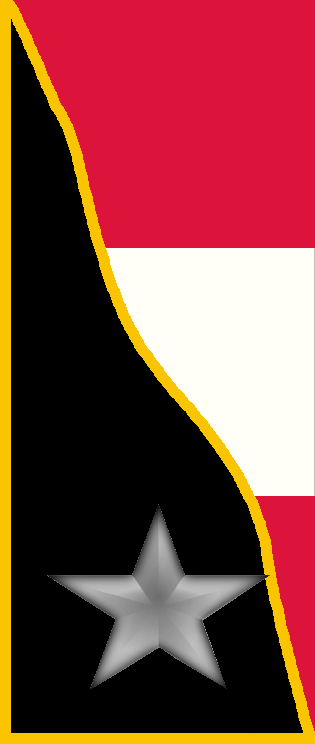
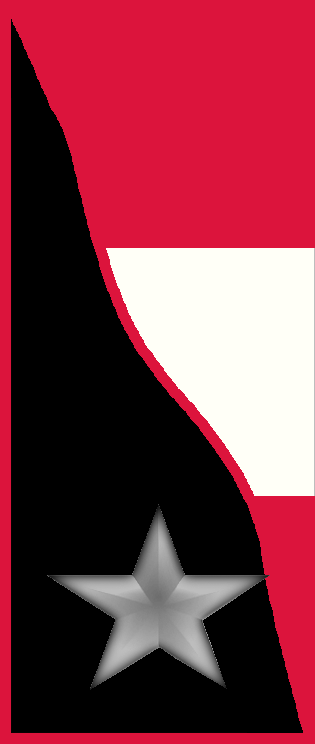
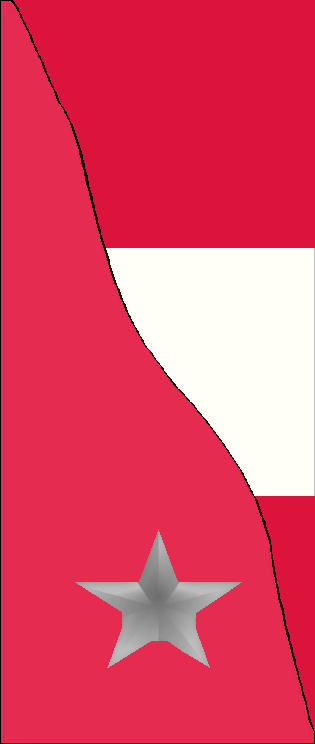
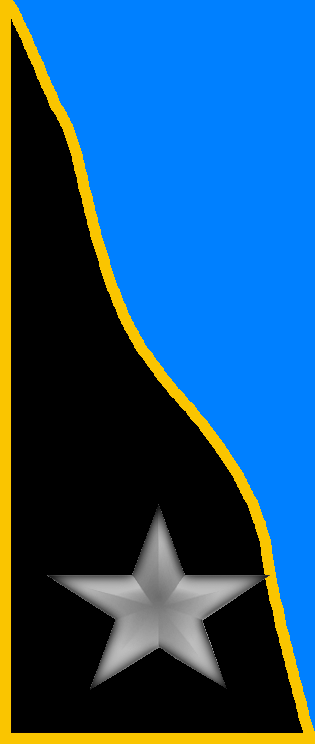
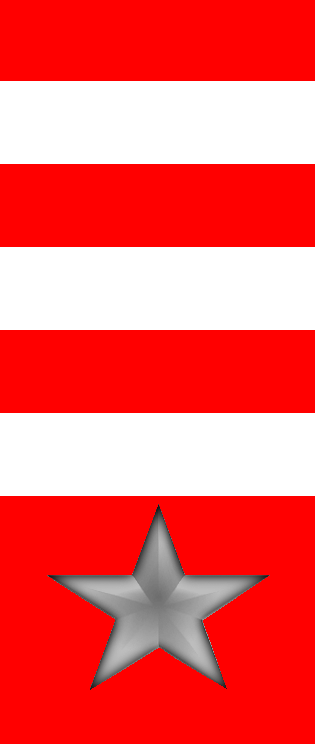
- Identification symbol: Vicenza Division gorget patches

The 156th Infantry Division "Vicenza" (Italian: 156ª Divisione di fanteria "Vicenza") was an infantry division of the Royal Italian Army during World War II. The Vicenza was formed on 10 March 1942 and named for the city of Vicenza. The Vicenza was classified as an occupation infantry division, which meant that the division's artillery regiment consisted of two artillery groups instead of the three artillery groups of line infantry divisions and that the divisional mortar battalion was replaced by a divisional machine gun battalion. The division was sent to the Eastern front, as part of the Italian Army in Russia. The division guarded the army's line of communications and rear area against Soviet partisans.

The Vicenza was overrun and destroyed by Soviet forces during Operation Little Saturn. Of the division's 10,466 men 7,760 were killed or missing during the battle in January 1943.

== History ==
=== World War I ===
The division's lineage begins with the Brigade "Vicenza" raised in July 1917 with the 277th, 278th, and 279th infantry regiments. The brigade fought on the Italian front in World War I and together with its regiments was disbanded after the war in February 1919.

=== World War II ===
The 156th Infantry Division Vicenza was activated in Brescia on 10 March 1942 and consisted of the 277th and 278th infantry regiments, and the 156th Artillery Regiment. As a division raised during the war the Vicenza did not have its own regimental depots and therefore its regiments were raised in February 1942 by the depots of the 15th Infantry Division "Bergamo": the 277th Infantry Regiment "Vicenza" in Rijeka by the 25th Infantry Regiment "Bergamo", the 278th Infantry Regiment "Vicenza" in Rijeka by the 26th Infantry Regiment "Bergamo", and the 156th Artillery Regiment "Vicenza" by the 30th Artillery Regiment "Lupi di Toscana" in Brescia.

The division arrived in Eastern Ukraine in July 1942. It assembled its units in Yenakiieve and Horlivka. It followed the Italian Army in Russia's advance to the Don river, operating in the army's rear area and securing the lines of communication. On 16 December 1942 the Vicenza entered the front between the 2nd Alpine Division "Tridentina" and 4th Alpine Division "Cuneense". On 18 January the Italian division's were in full retreat, walking through the icy Russian steppe towards the new Axis lines. On 25 January the Italians fought a battle at Nikitovka, and the next day the Battle of Nikolayevka. On the same day the main column of the Vicenza was surrounded and annihilated by Soviet Forces near Valuyki.

The few survivors were repatriated to Brescia, where the division was officially dissolved on 15 May 1943.

== Organization ==
156th Infantry Division "Vicenza" organization

When the division deployed to the Soviet Union it consisted of the following units:

- 156th Infantry Division "Vicenza"
  - Headquarters
    - Command Company
    - 136th Carabinieri Section
    - 137th Carabinieri Section
    - 156th Field Post Office
    - 156th Infantry Division Command Transport Squad
  - 277th Infantry Regiment "Vicenza"
    - Command Company
    - 3 × Fusilier battalions
    - Cannons Company (47/32 mod. 35 anti-tank guns)
    - Mortar Company (81mm Mod. 35 mortars)
  - 278th Infantry Regiment "Vicenza"
    - Command Company
    - 3 × Fusilier battalions
    - Cannons Company (47/32 mod. 35 anti-tank guns)
    - Mortar Company (81mm Mod. 35 mortars)
  - 156th Artillery Regiment "Vicenza" (remained in Italy, when the division deployed to the Soviet Union)
    - Command Unit
    - I Group (75/27 mod. 06 field guns; transferred on 10 March 1943 to the 152nd Artillery Regiment "Piceno")
    - II Group (75/27 mod. 06 field guns; transferred on 10 March 1943 to the 152nd Artillery Regiment "Piceno")
    - IV Group (100/17 mod. 14 howitzers; transferred on 1 July 1943 from the depot of the 5th Artillery Regiment "Superga")
    - 80th Battery (75/32 mod. 37 anti-tank guns; assigned on 1 July 1943)
    - 81st Battery (75/32 mod. 37 anti-tank guns; assigned on 1 July 1943)
    - 84th Battery (75/32 mod. 37 anti-tank guns; assigned on 1 July 1943)
    - 1 × Anti-aircraft battery (20/65 Mod. 35 anti-aircraft guns)
    - Ammunition and Supply Unit
  - 201st Motorized Artillery Regiment (attached in Soviet Union)
    - Command Unit
    - I Groups (75/32 mod. 37 field guns)
    - II Group (75/32 mod. 37 field guns)
    - III Group (75/32 mod. 37 field guns)
    - 2 × Anti-aircraft batteries (20/65 Mod. 35 anti-aircraft guns)
    - Ammunition and Supply Unit
  - CLVI Machine Gun Battalion
  - CLVI Mixed Engineer Battalion
    - 156th Engineer Company
    - 256th Telegraph and Radio Operators Company
  - 256th Anti-tank Company (47/32 mod. 35 anti-tank guns)
  - 156th Medical Section
    - 161st Field Hospital
    - 162nd Field Hospital
    - 1 × Surgical unit
  - 156th Supply Section
  - 1121st Transport Section (remained in Italy, when the division deployed to the Soviet Union)

In the Soviet Union the XXVI Carabinieri Battalion and the I Armored Car Platoon of the Regiment "Nizza Cavalleria" (1st) were attached to the division.

== Commanding officers ==
The division's commanding officers were:

- Generale di Divisione Enrico Broglia (10 March 1942 - 7 December 1942)
- Generale di Brigata Etelvoldo Pascolini (8 December 1942 - 15 May 1943)
