= Enrico Pezzi =

Enrico Pezzi may refer to:

- Enrico Pezzi (general) (1897–1942), Italian Air Force general
- Enrico Pezzi (footballer) (born 1989), Italian footballer
