= 3rd Alpine Division "Julia" =

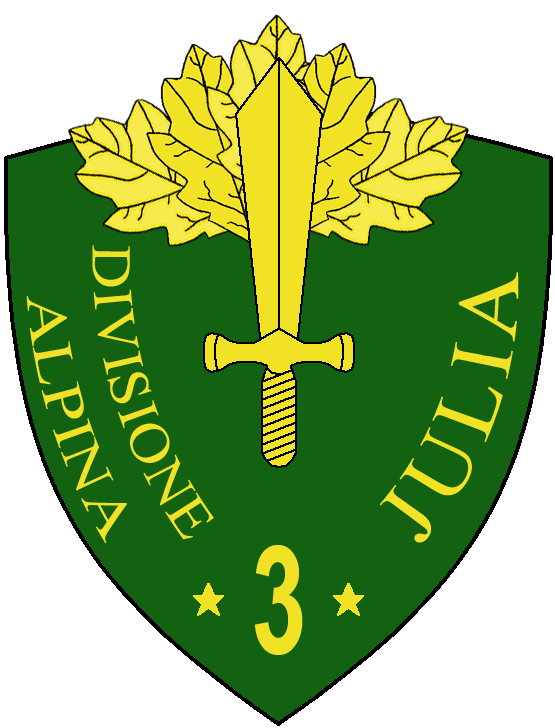
- 3rd Alpine Division "Julia" insignia
- Active: 10 December 1935 – 8 September 1943
- Country: Kingdom of Italy
- Branch: Royal Italian Army
- Type: Alpini
- Role: Mountain Infantry
- Size: 17,460 men
- Part of: Italian Alpine Corps; 1942–1943
- Garrison/HQ: Udine
- Engagements: World War II; Greco-Italian War; Italian War in Soviet Union

Commanders
- Notable commanders: Fedele de Giorgis; Mario Girotti; Umberto Ricagno

Insignia
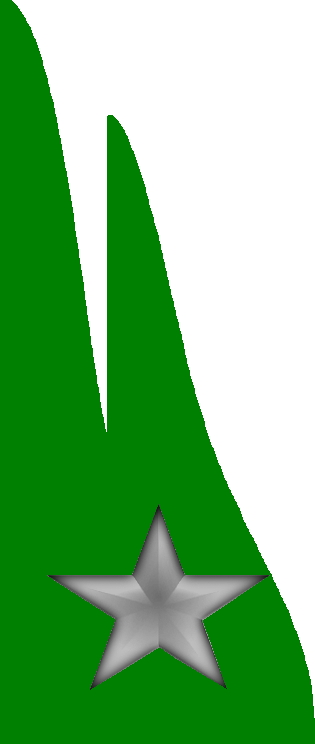
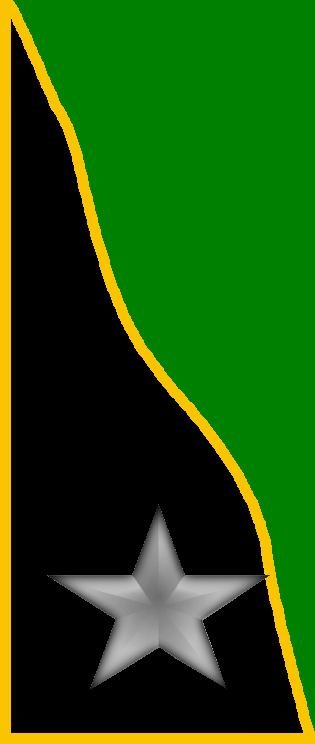
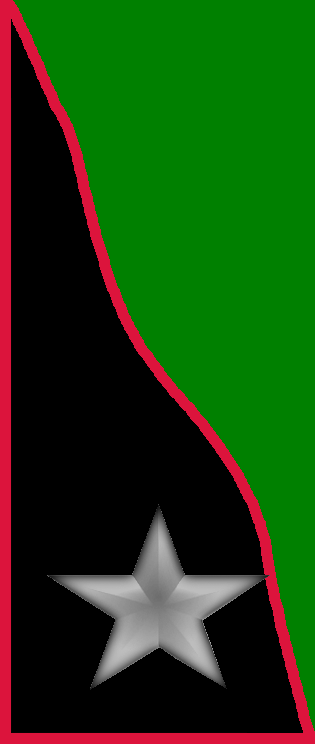
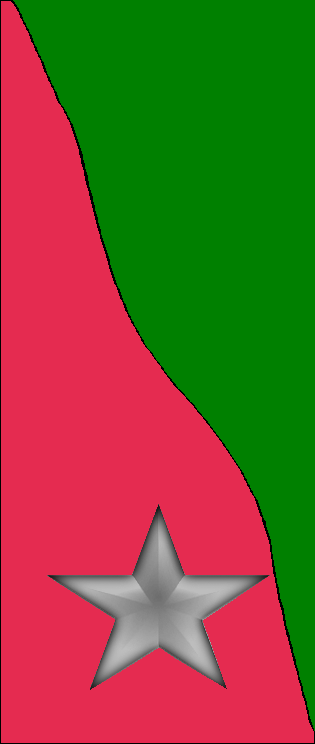
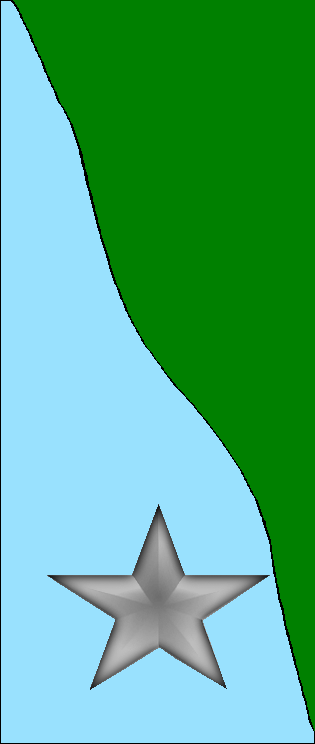
- Identification symbol: Julia Division gorget patches

The 3rd Alpine Division "Julia" (Italian: 3ª Divisione alpina "Julia") was a division of the Royal Italian Army during World War II, which specialized in mountain warfare. The Alpini that formed the divisions are a highly decorated, elite mountain corps of the Italian Army comprising both infantry and artillery units. Today the traditions and name of the 3rd Alpine Division "Julia" are carried on by the Alpine Brigade "Julia".

== History ==
The division's lineage begins with the III Alpine Brigade formed in Udine on 11 March 1926 with the 8th Alpini Regiment in Udine and 9th Alpini Regiment in Gorizia and the 3rd Mountain Artillery Regiment in Gorizia. On 27 October 1934 the brigade changed its name to 3rd Superior Alpine Command, which received the name Julio in December of the same year (Italian: 2° Comando Superiore Alpino "Julio").

On 10 September 1935 the III Superior Alpine Command "Julio" was reformed as 3rd Alpine Division "Julia" with the 7th, 8th, and 9th Alpini regiments and the 3rd Alpine Artillery Regiment. On 25 December 1935 the 7th Alpini Regiment, Alpine Artillery Group "Belluno", and one battery of the Alpine Artillery Group "Conegliano" were transferred to the newly raised 5th Alpine Division "Pusteria" on a temporary basis for the Second Italo-Ethiopian War. However, when the Pusteria returned from the war, these transfers became permanent, and the Julia also ceded the Alpini Battalion Bassano to the Pusteria.

=== World War II ===
The division participated in the Italian invasion of Albania in April 1939 and remained in Kukës in north-western Albania afterwards. In October 1940 the division moved to the border with Greece for the Greco-Italian War.

==== Greek campaign ====
The division participated in the Greco-Italian War, entering action on 28 October 1940 in the Battle of Pindus, where it suffered heavy casualties. The division remained in line until 10 November, when it was withdrawn for reorganization, but after only four days it had to go into battle again, in the Perat sector, where it sustained heavy Greek attacks until 8 December. On 23 December the division was again attacked by the Greeks; the attack lasted until 31 December and forced the Julia to retreat to Mali Qarishta, after heavy combat in extreme weather conditions. On 8 January 1941 a Greek offensive in the Berat sector hit the Julia hard; on the following day the division had to retreat to Mali Tabajan, and by 21 January the division was down to a single regiment with three understrength battalions. The remains of the Julia were withdrawn to the Hani Bubesit area and then transferred to Mavrovo, near Vlorë, where the division was reformed. At the end of February the division, now 10,500 strong, was sent again to the first line; on 24 February it was deployed on Mount Golico and the Zagorias Valley. On 28 February a new battle was fought in the Tepelenë sector; the Julia, as the last Italian unit defending the town, was attacked by the 2nd Greek Division in the Dragoti area, but managed to hold the front while suffering heavy casualties. On 7 March the Greeks attacked on Mount Golico, and two days later they renewed their attack, causing heavy losses; by 11 March the Greek offensive ended without taking Tepelenë, and both the Julia and the two Greek divisions involved in the attack (the 2nd and the 17th) were worn out by the heavy fighting and losses. The "Julia" took part in the April 1941 battle of the Perati bridge. Following the fall of Greece, the division was transferred to the Corinth Canal area and occupied the Peloponnese. During the Greco-Italian War the division had suffered overall 9,317 casualties: 49 officers and 1,625 soldiers during October-November 1940, 153 officers and 3,644 soldiers between December 1940 and January 1941, and 116 officers and 3,730 soldiers between February and April 1941.

==== Soviet Union ====
The division remained in Greece on garrison duty until March 1942, when it was repatriated to Italy in preparation of its transfer to the Eastern Front as part of the Italian Army in Russia. On 28 March one of the troopships carrying the division back to Italy, the SS Galilea, was torpedoed and sunk by a submarine with the loss of 600 men from the Battalion "Gemona". The division's strength was increased to 16,000 men and on 14 July 1942 the Julia began its transfer to the Soviet Union. The Julia formed, together with the 2nd Alpine Division "Tridentina" and the 4th Alpine Division "Cuneense", the Alpine Army Corps.

By 25 September 1942 the division was deployed on the Don river between Kuvshin and Karawut. On 12 December 1942 the Red Army's Operation Little Saturn commenced, which in its first stage attacked and encircled the Italian Army in Russia's II Army Corps and XXXV Army Corps. On 13 January 1943, the Red Army launched the second stage of Operation Little Saturn: four armies of General Filipp Golikov's Voronezh Front attacked, encircled, and destroyed the Hungarian Second Army near Svoboda on the Don to the northwest of the Alpine Army Corps and pushed back the remaining units of the German XXIV Army Corps on the Alpine Army Corps' left flank, thus encircling the Alpine Army Corps.

On the evening of 17 January, the Alpine Army Corps commander, General Gabriele Nasci, ordered a full retreat. At this point only the Tridentina division was still capable of conducting effective combat operations. The 40,000-strong mass of stragglers — Alpini and Italians from other commands, plus German and Hungarian Hussars — formed two columns that followed the Tridentina division which, supported by a handful of German armored vehicles, led the way westwards to the Axis lines. On 1 February 1943 the remnants of the Alpine Army Corps reached Axis lines. The Julia suffered heavy losses in the breakout: less than a tenth of the Julia survived (approximately 1,200 survivors of 18,000 troops deployed).

==== Return to Italy ====
The remnants of the division were repatriated in May 1943 and the division was reformed on 1 May 1943 with troops of the 1st Alpini "Valley" Group of the 6th Alpine Division "Alpi Graie". After the announcement of the Armistice of Cassibile on 8 September 1943 the invading German forces disbanded the division.

== Organization ==
3rd Alpine Division "Julia" organization during the campaign on the Eastern Front

When the division was deployed to the Soviet Union it consisted of the following units:

- 3rd Alpine Division "Julia", in Udine
  - Headquarters
    - Command Company
    - 415th Carabinieri Section
    - 416th Carabinieri Section
    - 202nd Field Post Office
    - 3rd Alpine Division Command Transport Squad
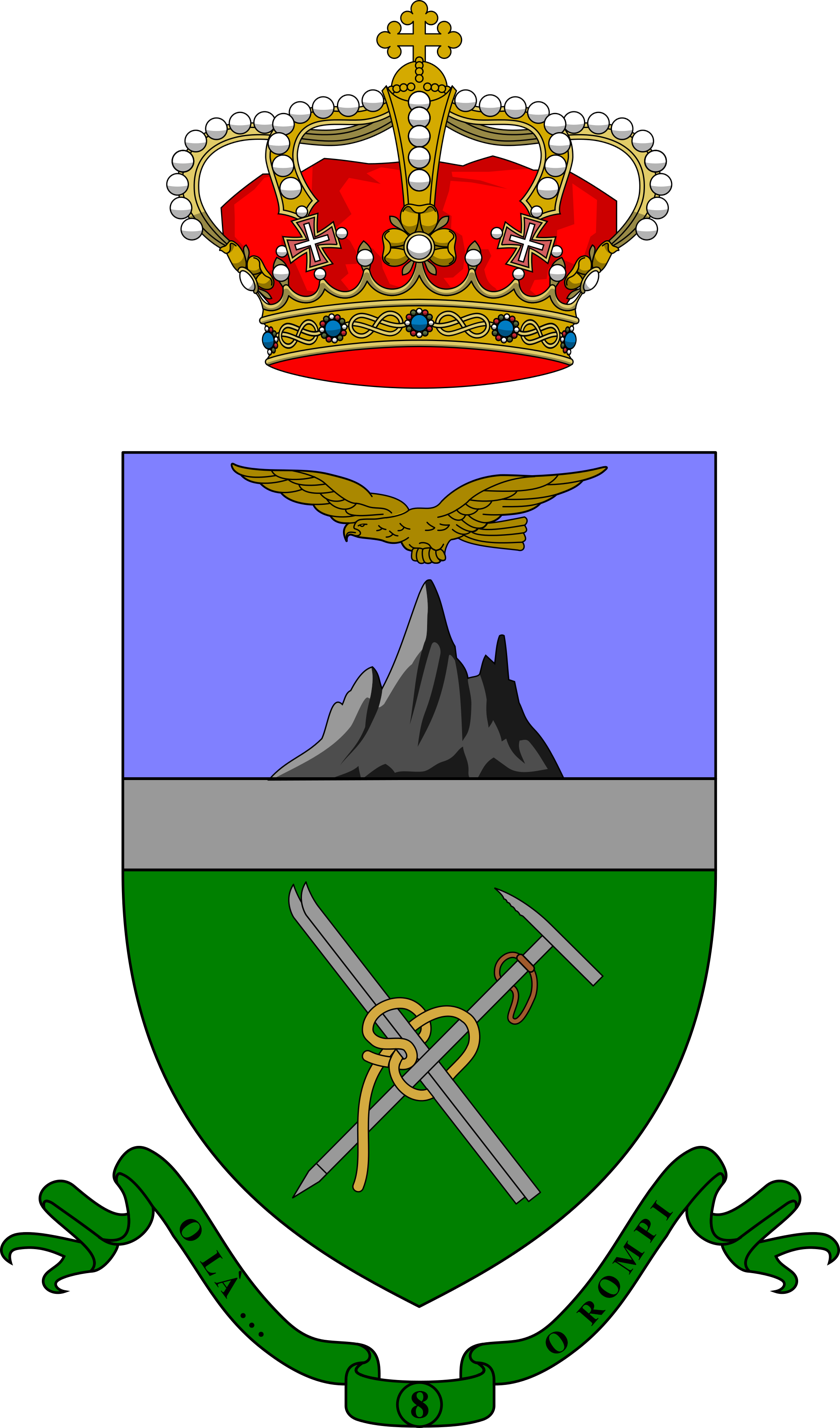
  - 8th Alpini Regiment, in Udine
    - Command Company
    - Alpini Battalion "Gemona"
      - Command Company
      - 69th, 70th, and 71st Alpini companies
      - 116th Support Weapons Company (Breda M37 machine guns, 45mm mod. 35 and 81mm mod. 35 mortars)
    - Alpini Battalion "Tolmezzo"
      - Command Company
      - 6th, 12th, and 72nd Alpini companies
      - 114th Support Weapons Company (Breda M37 machine guns, 45mm mod. 35 and 81mm mod. 35 mortars)
    - Alpini Battalion "Cividale"
      - Command Company
      - 16th, 20th, and 76th Alpini companies
      - 115th Support Weapons Company (Breda M37 machine guns, 45mm mod. 35 and 81mm mod. 35 mortars)
    - 41st Cannons Company (47/32 mod. 35 anti-tank guns; formed by the regiment for the campaign in the Soviet Union)
    - 8th Supply Section
    - 28th Train Section (equipped with mules)
    - 308th Medical Section (includes the 814th Field Hospital)
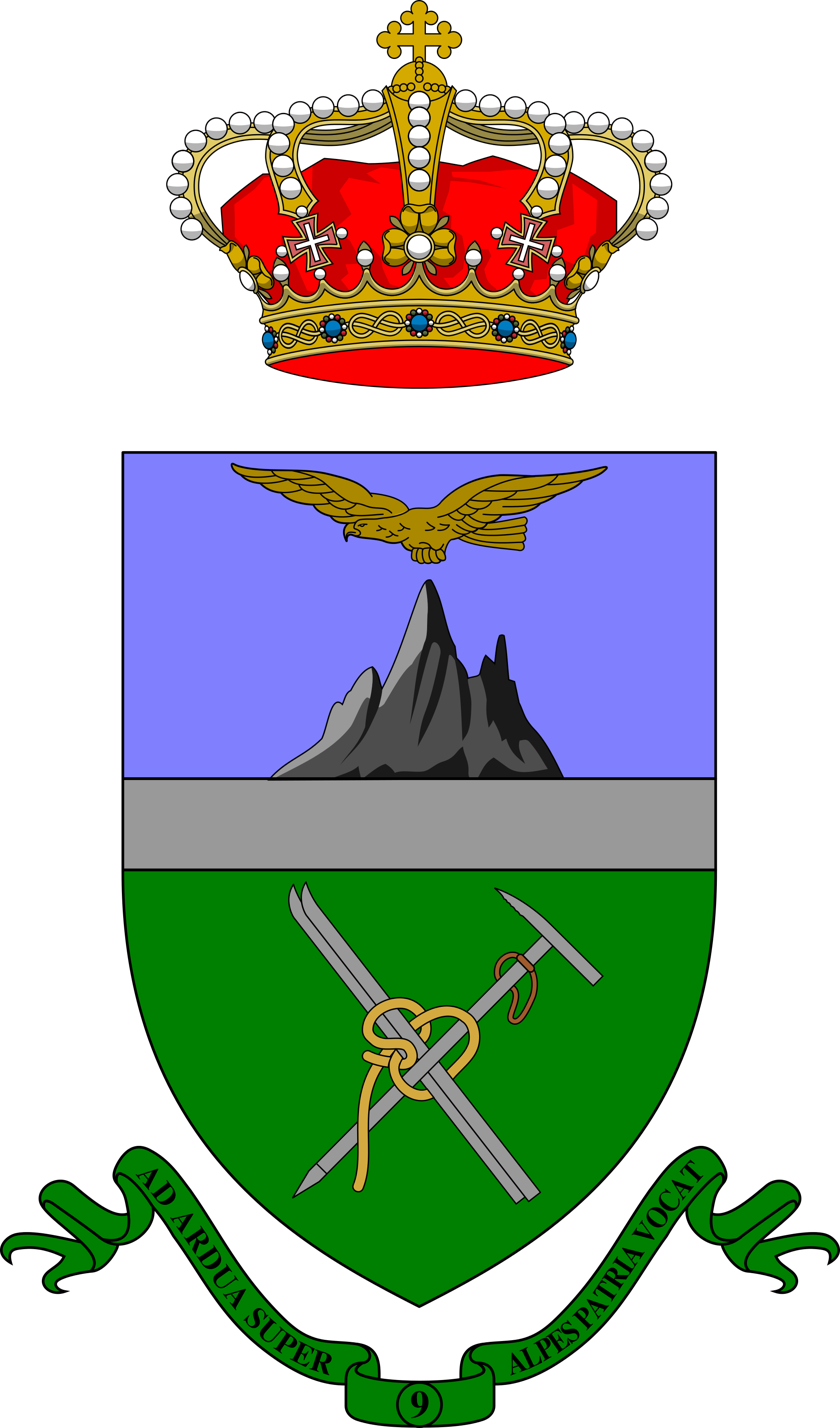
  - 9th Alpini Regiment, in Gorizia
    - Command Company
    - Alpini Battalion "L'Aquila"
      - Command Company
      - 93rd, 108th, and 143rd Alpini companies
      - 119th Support Weapons Company (Breda M37 machine guns, 45mm mod. 35 and 81mm mod. 35 mortars)
    - Alpini Battalion "Vicenza"
      - Command Company
      - 59th, 60th, and 61st Alpini companies
      - 117th Support Weapons Company (Breda M37 machine guns, 45mm mod. 35 and 81mm mod. 35 mortars)
    - Alpini Battalion "Bassano" (ceded to the 11th Alpini Regiment) on 25 September 1937)
    - Alpini Battalion "Val Cismon" (transferred from the 7th Alpini Regiment) on 17 April 1941)
      - Command Company
      - 264th, 265th, and 277th Alpini companies
      - 118th Support Weapons Company (Breda M37 machine guns, 45mm mod. 35 and 81mm mod. 35 mortars)
    - 83rd Cannons Company (47/32 mod. 35 anti-tank guns; formed by the regiment for the campaign in the Soviet Union)
    - 9th Supply Section
    - 29th Train Section (equipped with mules)
    - 309th Medical Section (includes the 630th Field Hospital)
  - 3rd Alpine Artillery Regiment, in Udine
    - Command Unit
    - Alpine Artillery Group "Conegliano" (75/13 mod. 15 mountain guns)
      - 13th Battery
      - 14th Battery
      - 15th Battery
      - Ammunition and Supply Unit
    - Alpine Artillery Group "Udine" (75/13 mod. 15 mountain guns)
      - 17th Battery
      - 18th Battery
      - 34th Battery
      - Ammunition and Supply Unit
    - Alpine Artillery Group "Val Piave" (assigned in April 1942 for the campaign in the Soviet Union; 105/11 mod. 28 mountain guns)
      - 35th Battery
      - 36th Battery
      - 39th Battery
      - Ammunition and Supply Unit
    - 45th Anti-aircraft Battery (20/65 mod. 35 anti-aircraft guns; assigned for the campaign in the Soviet Union)
    - 47th Anti-aircraft Battery (20/65 mod. 35 anti-aircraft guns; assigned for the campaign in the Soviet Union)
    - 77th Anti-tank Battery (attached in the Soviet Union, 75/39 anti-tank guns; assigned for the campaign in the Soviet Union)
  - III Mixed Alpine Engineer Battalion
    - Command Platoon
    - 103rd Searchlight Section
    - 113th Telegraph and Radio Operators Company
    - 123rd Engineer Company
  - 8th Train Column (expanded to 8th Train Unit for the campaign in the Soviet Union; both units equipped with mules)
  - 111th Supply Section
  - 207th Mixed Transport Unit
    - 127th Mixed Transport Platoon
    - 725th Heavy Transport Platoon
    - 726th Heavy Transport Platoon
    - 950th Heavy Transport Platoon
  - 303rd Medical Section
    - 628th Field Hospital
    - 629th Field Hospital
    - 633rd Field Hospital
    - 813th Field Hospital

The division strength was 573 officers and 16,887 NCOs and soldiers for a total strength of 17,460 men. The division also had 176 horses, 4,698 mules and 584 transport vehicles at its disposal.

== Military honors ==
For their conduct during the Greco-Italian War and during the Italian campaign in the Soviet Union the President of Italy awarded on to the three regiments of the 3rd Alpine Division "Julia" Italy's highest military honor, the Gold Medal of Military Valor. This makes the 3rd Alpine Division "Julia" together with the 3rd Cavalry Division "Principe Amedeo Duca d'Aosta" the two highest decorated Italian divisions of World War II.

Greco-Italian War:

- 8th Alpini Regiment on 30 January 1948
- 9th Alpini Regiment on 30 January 1948
- 3rd Alpine Artillery Regiment on 8 February 1945

Italian participation in the Eastern Front|Italian campaign in the Soviet Union:

- 8th Alpini Regiment on 31 December 1947
- 9th Alpini Regiment on 31 December 1947
- 3rd Alpine Artillery Regiment on 31 December 1947

== Commanding officers ==
The division's commanding officers were:

- Generale di Divisione Carlo Rossi (1935 - 1 September 1938)
- Generale di Divisione Fedele De Giorgis (2 September 1938 - 6 August 1940)
- Colonel Gaetano Tavoni (acting, 7 August 1940 - 21 September 1940)
- Generale di Divisione Mario Girotti (22 September 1940 - 10 September 1941)
- Generale di Divisione Umberto Ricagno (11 September 1941 - May 1943)
- Generale di Divisione Franco Testi (16 May 1943 - 12 September 1943)

== See also ==
- Italian Army in Russia
- Alpine Brigade "Julia"
