= Italian Army in Russia =

Italian army in the Eastern Front

8th Army 8^{a} Armata
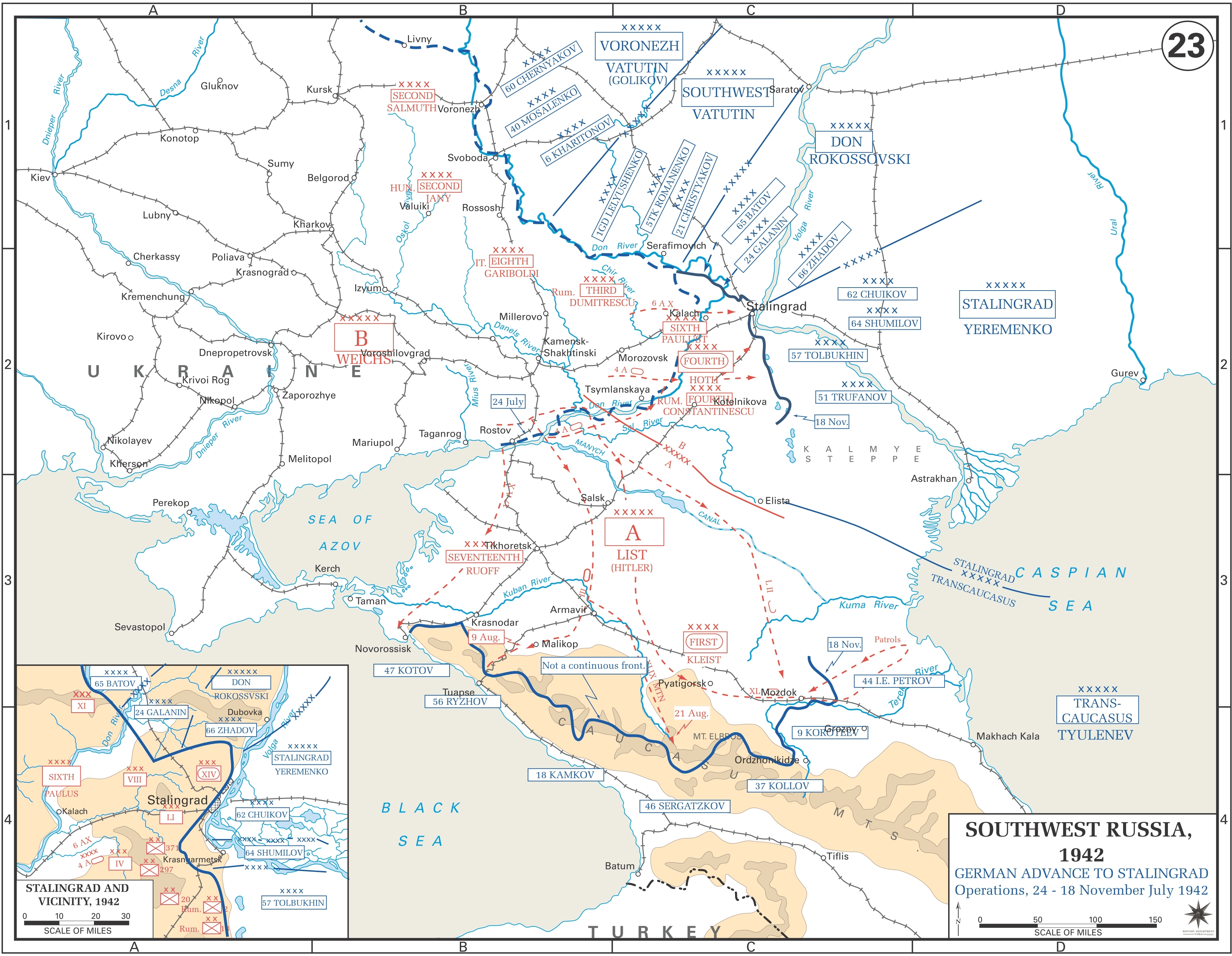
- Gariboldi ARMIR near the Don river, 200 kilometres (120 mi) north of Stalingrad, in autumn 1942
- Active: 1942–1943
- Country: Kingdom of Italy
- Branch: Royal Italian Army
- Size: Field army ~ 235,000 (November 1942)
- Engagements: World War II: Battle of Stalingrad; Battle of Nikolayevka

Commanders
- Notable commanders: Italo Gariboldi

The Italian Army in Russia (Italian: Armata Italiana in Russia; ARMIR) was a combined force the size of a field army unit of the Regio Esercito (Royal Italian Army) which fought on the Eastern Front during World War II between July 1942 and April 1943. The ARMIR was also known as the 8th Italian Army and initially had 235,000 soldiers. The bulk of this force was destroyed by the Soviet Red Army at the Battle of Stalingrad, after which Mussolini withdrew the remnants from Russia to the West.

== Formation ==
The three divisions of the Italian Expeditionary Corps in Russia (Corpo di spedizione italiano in Russia, or CSIR), sent to the eastern front in July 1941, were very successful, taking a number of towns and cities and creating a favourable impression on their German allies.

In July 1942, when Italian dictator Benito Mussolini decided to scale up the Italian effort in the Soviet Union, the existing CSIR was expanded to become the ARMIR. Unlike the "mobile" CSIR which it replaced, the ARMIR was primarily an infantry army. A good portion of the ARMIR was made up of mountain troops (Alpini), which were ill-suited to the vast, flat expanses of southern Russia.

Like the CSIR, the ARMIR included an Aviation Command (Comando Aereo) with a limited number of fighters, bombers, and transport aircraft. This command was part of the Regia Aeronautica (lit. "Royal Air Force") and was also known as the Corpo Aereo Spedizione in Russia ("Air Expeditionary Corps in Russia"), under the command of General Enrico Pezzi. The ARMIR was subordinated to German Army Group B (Heeresgruppe B) commanded by General Maximilian von Weichs. In February 1943, after its near destruction during the Battle of Stalingrad, Mussolini disbanded what was left of the Italian 8th Army and the surviving Italian troops were unceremoniously brought home from Russia.

== Composition ==
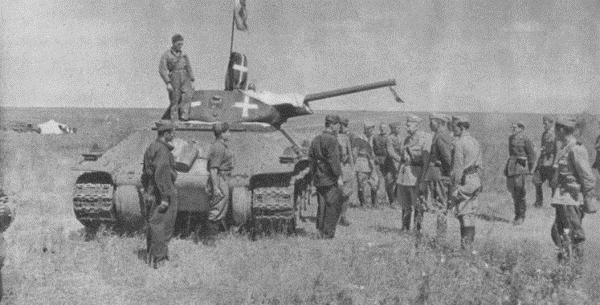
Italo Gariboldi, commander of the 8th Italian Army, inspects a captured T-34 tank

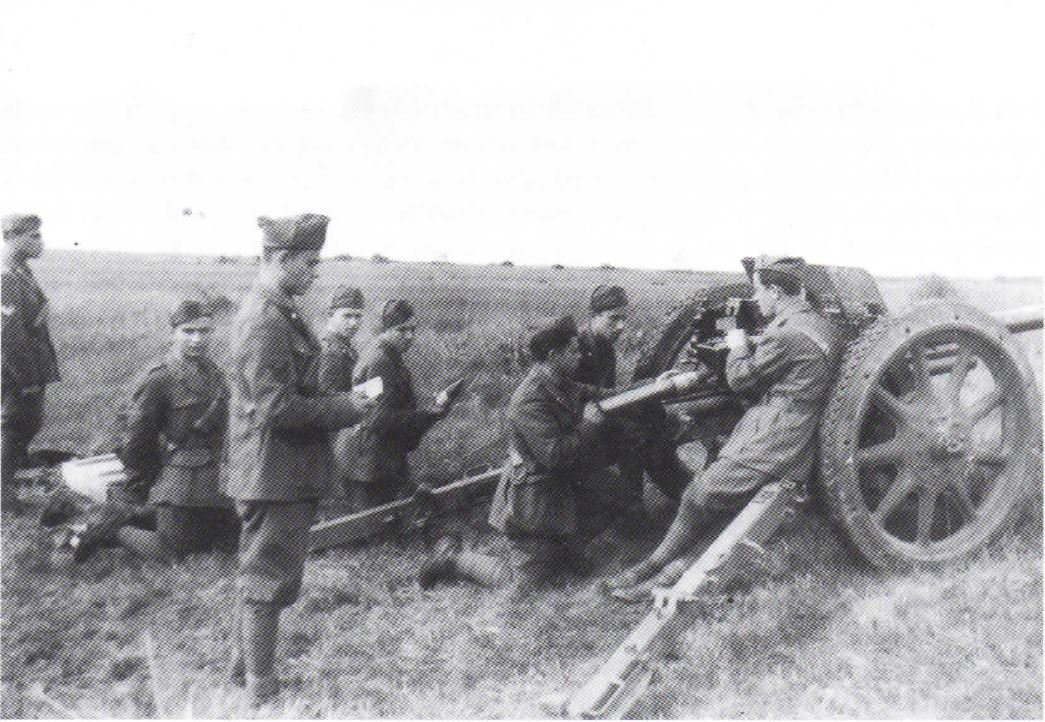
75/32 gun of the Italian army on the Russian front

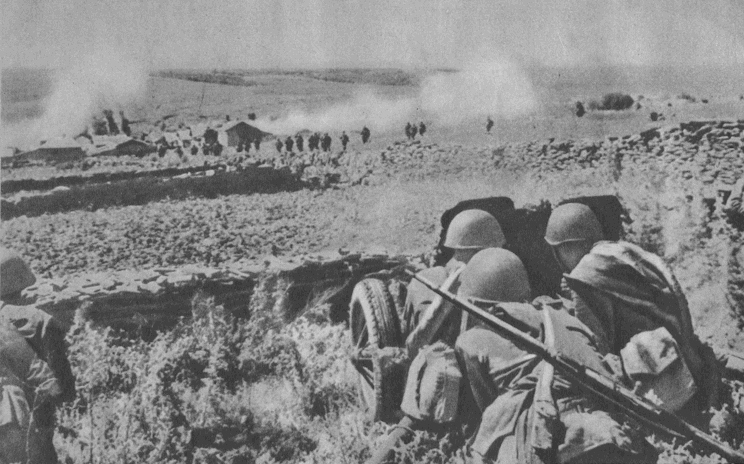
Italian anti-tank gun during a Soviet attack

Mussolini sent seven fresh divisions to Russia for a total of ten divisions. Four infantry divisions were sent: the 2nd Infantry Division "Sforzesca", the 3rd Infantry Division "Ravenna", the 5th Infantry Division "Cosseria", and the 156th Infantry Division "Vicenza". In addition to the infantry divisions, three alpine divisions made up of Alpini were sent: the 2nd Alpine Division "Tridentina", the 3rd Alpine Division "Julia", and the 4th Alpine Division "Cuneense". These divisions were added to the 3rd Cavalry Division "Principe Amedeo Duca d'Aosta", 9th Infantry Division "Pasubio", and 52nd Infantry Division "Torino", which were already in Russia as part of the CSIR.

The 8th Italian Army was organized into three corps:

- II Army Corps (Giovanni Zanghieri),
  - 2nd Infantry Division "Sforzesca" (Carlo Pellegrini),
  - 3rd Infantry Division "Ravenna" (Francesco Du Pont),
  - 5th Infantry Division "Cosseria" (Enrico Gazzale)
- XXXV Army Corps (Giovanni Messe - replaced 1942.11.01 by Francesco Zingales),
  - 3rd Cavalry Division "Principe Amedeo Duca d'Aosta" (Ettore de Blasio),
  - 9th Infantry Division "Pasubio" (Guido Boselli),
  - 52nd Infantry Division "Torino" (Roberto Lerici),
- Alpine Army Corps (Gabriele Nasci).
  - 2nd Alpine Division "Tridentina" (Luigi Reverberi),
  - 3rd Alpine Division "Julia" (Umberto Ricagno - POW),
  - 4th Alpine Division "Cuneense" (Emilio Battisti - POW)
- Under direct command of the 8th Army
  - 156th Infantry Division "Vicenza" (Etelvoldo Pascolini - POW), primarily utilized behind the front on "lines of communications" duties, security and anti-partisan and to act as a reserve.

In addition to the ten divisions, the 8th Italian Army included

- 298th German Division
- 62nd German division (later being sent to Stalingrad),
- Croatian Light Transport Brigade,
- three legions of Italian Blackshirt volunteers (Camicie Nere, or CC.NN.).

By November 1942, the 8th Italian Army had a total of 235,000 men in twelve divisions, including a Croatian volunteer Legion and three Legions of Camicie Nere (Blackshirt fascist volunteers). It was equipped with 2,657 light and 1,742 heavy machine guns, 250 light and 600 heavy artillery pieces, 52 anti-aircraft guns, 874 light mortars (45mm) and 423 heavy mortars (81mm), 278 Italian 47/32 and 54 German 7.5 cm Pak 97/38 anti-tank guns, 25,000 pack animals, 16,700 vehicles and 4,770 motorcycles.

Because of its heavy commitments in North Africa, the armoured component of the ARMIR was tiny. The LXVII Armored Bersaglieri Battalion included two companies of L6/40 light tanks (armed with a turret-mounted 20 mm Breda Model 35 gun), numbering about 60 tanks. The XIII Self-propelled Anti-tank Group "Cavalleggeri di Alessandria" had two squadrons of 19 Semovente da 47/32 assault guns. For anti-tank defence, the ARMIR had been allocated 278 guns of the 47/32 type (Cannone da 47/32 M35). Both the L6/40 light tanks and the 47 mm anti-tank guns were out of date compared to what the Soviets had available to them in late 1942 and early 1943. As far as heavy artillery was concerned, however, the ARMIR received preferential treatment over Italian forces in North Africa. It boasted, for instance, the only existing battery of 210/22 howitzers (Obice da 210/22), 36 of the 51 available 149/40 guns (Cannone da 149/40 modello 35), and all 36 modern 75/32 field guns in existence at the time. The 75/18 and 75/32 howitzers balanced the limited suitability of the 47/32 guns to some degree. The 36 75/32 howitzers of the 201st Motorised Artillery Regiment (Celere), proved particularly effective in the anti-tank role.

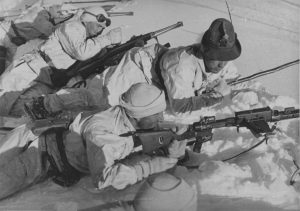
Italian soldiers on the Russian Front, with a Breda 30 machine gun. Breda Mod. 30 was the basic light machine gun of the Italian army during World War II

As was the complaint of General Messe with the CSIR, the ARMIR was short of adequate winter equipment.

The Aviation Command of the ARMIR had a total of roughly 100 aircraft. The ARMIR had the following aircraft available to it: Macchi C.200 "Arrow" (Saetta) fighter, Macchi C.202 "Lightning" (Folgore) fighter, Caproni Ca.311 light reconnaissance-bomber, and Fiat Br.20 "Stork" (Cicogna) twin-engined bomber.

== Commander ==
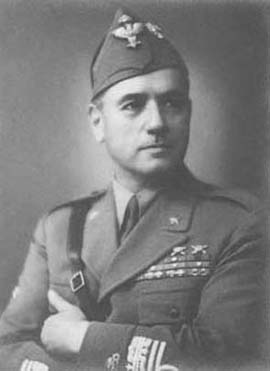
General Messe

Italian General Italo Gariboldi took command of the newly formed ARMIR, instead of General Giovanni Messe. As commander of the CSIR, Messe had opposed an enlargement of the Italian contingent in Russia until it could be properly equipped. Rather than a numerical reinforcement of Italian troops in Russia, Messe asked for a rise in heavy artillery supply, motor vehicles, tanks and antitank weapons. As a result, he was overruled by Mussolini and the CSIR was expanded without his further input.

Just prior to commanding the ARMIR, Gariboldi was the Governor-General of Italian Libya. He was criticized after the war for being too submissive to the Germans in North Africa. Messe remained commander of the 3 initial divisions of the CSIR, which was renamed XXXV Army Corps, but was subordinate to Gariboldi. He was replaced by Francesco Zingales in November 1942.

Air Brigade General Enrico Pezzi was appointed commander of the air force component of the Italian Army in Russia, distinguishing himself in operations on the Eastern Front, for which he was awarded the Knight's Cross of the Military Order of Savoy and his fifth and last Silver Medal for Military Valor by the Italian authorities, as well as the Cross of Merit of the Order of the German Eagle 1st Class with Swords, the Iron Cross First Class and the Iron Cross Second Class.

== Main operations ==
On 12 July, two weeks after Case Blue began, the XXXV Army Corps (ex CSIR), along with two German corps, began an offensive designed to take the important coal-mining basin of Krasnyi Luch (southeast of Kharkiv) with a rapid enveloping manoeuvre. After a week of heavy fighting in which all three Italian divisions took part the Krasnyi Luch basin, one of the richest coal deposits in the U.S.S.R., was in Axis hands.

As the Italians moved forward to the Don river pursuing the withdrawing Soviet 63rd Army, the highly-mobile riflemen (Bersaglieri) of the motorized 3rd Cavalry Division were diverted to help the Germans eliminate the Soviet bridgehead at Serafimovič on the Don river. From 30 July to 13 August, the Italians fought off a heavy Soviet attack, took the town, swept the woods and swamps around it, and fought off infiltrations and counter-attacks, destroying an enemy armoured brigade, knocking out 35 Soviet tanks and taking 1,600 prisoners. The 75/32 battery proved very effective at short range and destroyed twelve tanks. The battle cost the division 2,989 dead and wounded and the division was withdrawn from the front line to rest and regroup.

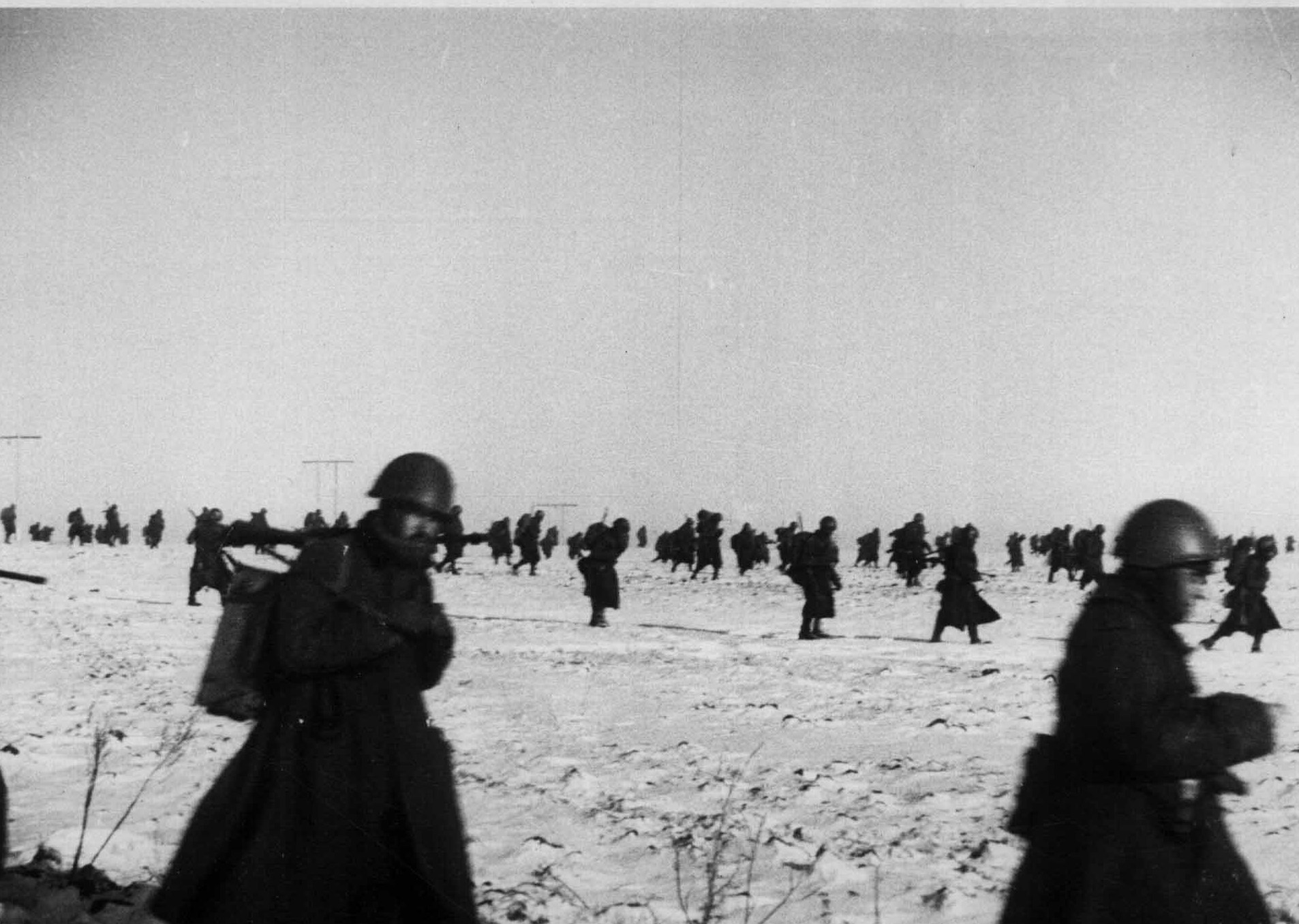
Italian column moving towards new positions in the winter of 1942

On 13 August, the Italian 8th Army reached its assigned sector on the Don on the left flank of the 6th Army's XVII Corps. The Italians had to defend a 270-kilometre front along the right bank of the Don.

On 20 August 1942, the first battle in defence of the Don began. The Russians succeeded in making progress on the front of the XVII German Army Corps drawn up on the right of the Italian XXXV, which also was attacked in force and threatened on its flank and in its rear by the partial yielding of the German Forces.

Italian forces were fighting on a wide front (30 km for the XXXV Army Corps), but succeeded in holding the enemy who was superior, both numerically and in combat means.

On 22 August, Giovanni Messe's XXXV Army Corps received as reinforcements the 3rd Cavalry Division, the Cervino Mountain Battalion and the remnant (a little more than 400 men) of the German 129th Infantry Regiment. The reinforcement of the entire broad front with the few available units meant their attenuation, robbing them of their efficiency. Messe decided to counterattack, choosing his directions of attack and concentrating in those places all the forces available to him. The counterattack began favourably and important positions were retaken.

The Charge of the Savoia Cavalleria at Izbushensky was a clash between the Italian cavalry Regiment "Savoia Cavalleria" (3rd) and the Soviet 812th Rifle Regiment (304th Rifle Division) that took place on 24 August 1942, near the hamlet (khutor) of Izbushensky (Избушенский), close to the junction between the Don and Khopyor rivers. Though a minor skirmish in the theatre of operation of the Eastern Front, the Izbushensky charge had great propaganda resonance in Italy and it is still remembered as one of the last significant cavalry charges in history.

The counterattack executed by the Italians forced the Russians to halt operations, but when they had received reinforcements, the Soviets resumed the offensive, continuing it until 26 September. On that day the weather conditions permitted intervention by Italian and German Air Forces which dropped large caliber bombs in the midst of Russian concentrations, forcing the Soviets to halt their operations.

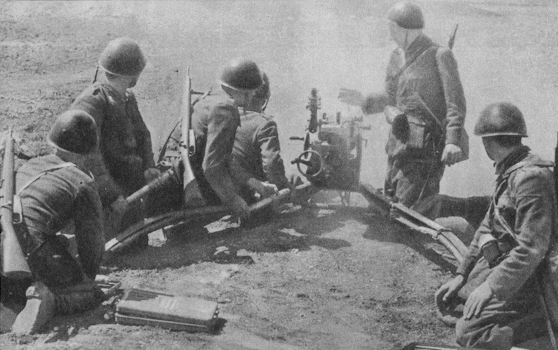
Men of the 'Sforzesca' division in action on the Russian front

On 11 and 12 September, the Italian 2nd Army Corps which, with the "Cosseria" and "Ravenna" Divisions, occupied a 60 km front, was also attacked. The divisions counterattacked and pursued the enemy across the Don. In October and November of 1942, there occurred a pause in the operations on the front occupied by Italian forces. The ARMIR laboured intensively at the task of fortifying the broad front of nearly 300 km that had been assigned to it. It got back the mountain corps ("Tridentina", "Cuneense", and "Julia" Divisions) in the beginning destined for the Caucasus but, because of the lack of success of the German operations in that direction, they were sent back to the ARMIR. The Italians ought to have had in reserve three divisions and, further back, a German armoured division. But the Russian counteroffensive against the German forces which were aiming at Stalingrad and the Caucasus, had required that the reserve units be sent elsewhere, as well as the armoured division, so that ARMIR was disposed with all the divisions in the first line and but a few small supporting units in the divisional sectors. Moreover, there were no anti-tank weapons or anti-aircraft weapons needed for resisting any enemy action. Gariboldi had objected to this situation but was commanded from Rome to bow to all dispositions made by the German command, this course having been agreed on by the two allies. Giovanni Messe, the commander of the XXXV Army Corps, wrote that it was necessary for him to refuse to accept a mission which endangered the very existence of the entire Italian 8th Army and the prestige of Italian arms. Personally, for various reasons, on 23 September 1943, he asked to be replaced in the command of the XXXV Army Corps, and obtained authorization to return to Italy where he arrived on 1 November.

Finally, the ARMIR faced Operation Little Saturn in December 1942. The aim of this Soviet operation was the complete annihilation of the Italian 8th Army, as a result of the operations related to the Battle of Stalingrad.

On 11 December 1942 the Soviet 63rd Army, backed by T-34 tanks and fighter-bombers, first attacked the weakest Italian sector. This sector was held on the right by the Ravenna and Cosseria infantry divisions. Indeed, from the Soviet bridgehead at Mamon, 15 divisions—supported by at least 100 tanks—attacked the Italian Cosseria and Ravenna Divisions, and although outnumbered 9 to 1, the Italians resisted until 19 December, when ARMIR headquarters finally ordered the battered divisions to withdraw. Only before Christmas both divisions were driven back and defeated, after heavy and bloody fighting.

Meanwhile, on 17 December 1942, the Soviet 21st Army and the Soviet 5th Tank Army attacked and defeated what remained of the Romanians to the right of the Italians. At about the same time, the Soviet 3rd Tank Army and parts of the Soviet 40th Army hit the Hungarians to the left of the Italians. This resulted in a collapse of the Axis front, north of Stalingrad: the ARMIR was encircled, but for some days the Italian troops were able—with huge casualties—to stop the attacking Soviet troops.

The Soviet 1st Guards Army then attacked the Italian centre which was held by the 298th German, the Pasubio, the Torino, the Prince Amedeo Duke of Aosta, and the Sforzesca divisions. After eleven days of bloody fighting against overwhelming Soviet forces, these divisions were surrounded and defeated and Russian air support resulted in the death of General Paolo Tarnassi, commander of the Italian armoured force in Russia.

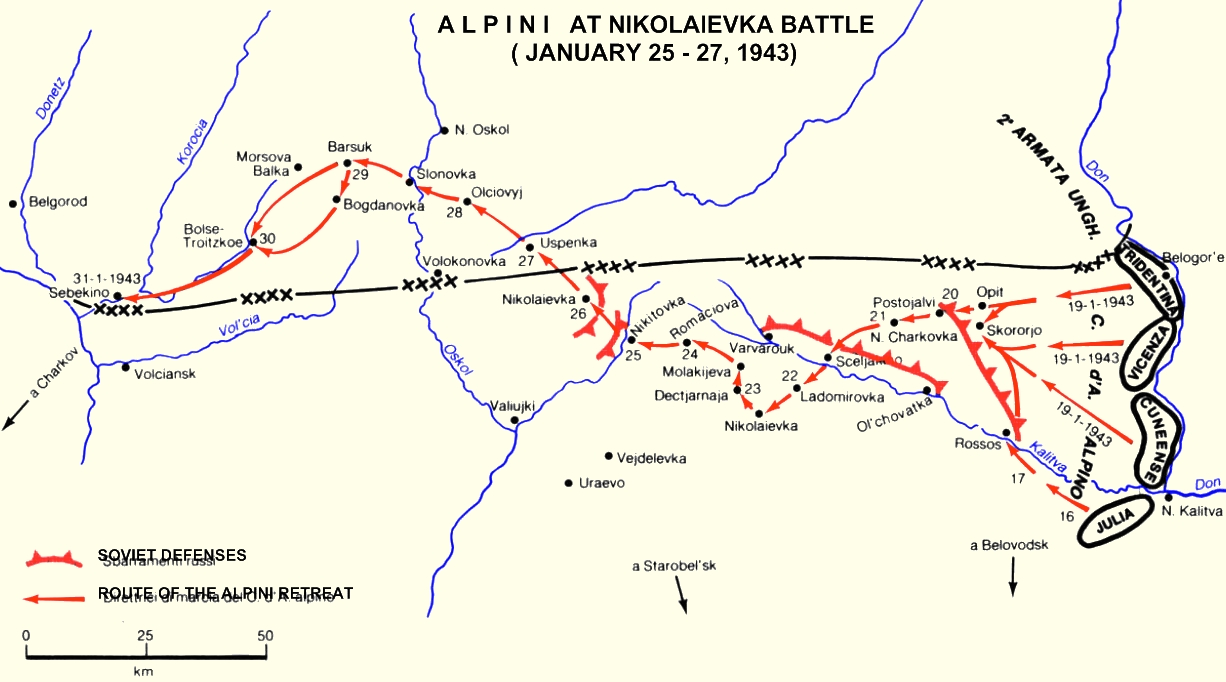
Route of the Alpini toward Nikolaievka

On 14 January 1943, after a short pause, the 6th Soviet Army attacked the divisions of the Alpine Corps as part of the Ostrogozhsk-Rossosh offensive. These units had been placed on the left flank of the Italian army and, to date, were still relatively unaffected by the battle. However, the Alpini's position had turned critical after the collapse of the Italian centre, the collapse of the Italian right flank, and the simultaneous collapse of the Hungarian troops to the left of the Alpini. The Julia Division and Cuneense Division were destroyed. Members of the 1 Alpini Regiment, part of Cuneese Division, burned the regimental flags to keep them from being captured. Part of the Tridentina Division and other withdrawing troops managed to escape the encirclement.

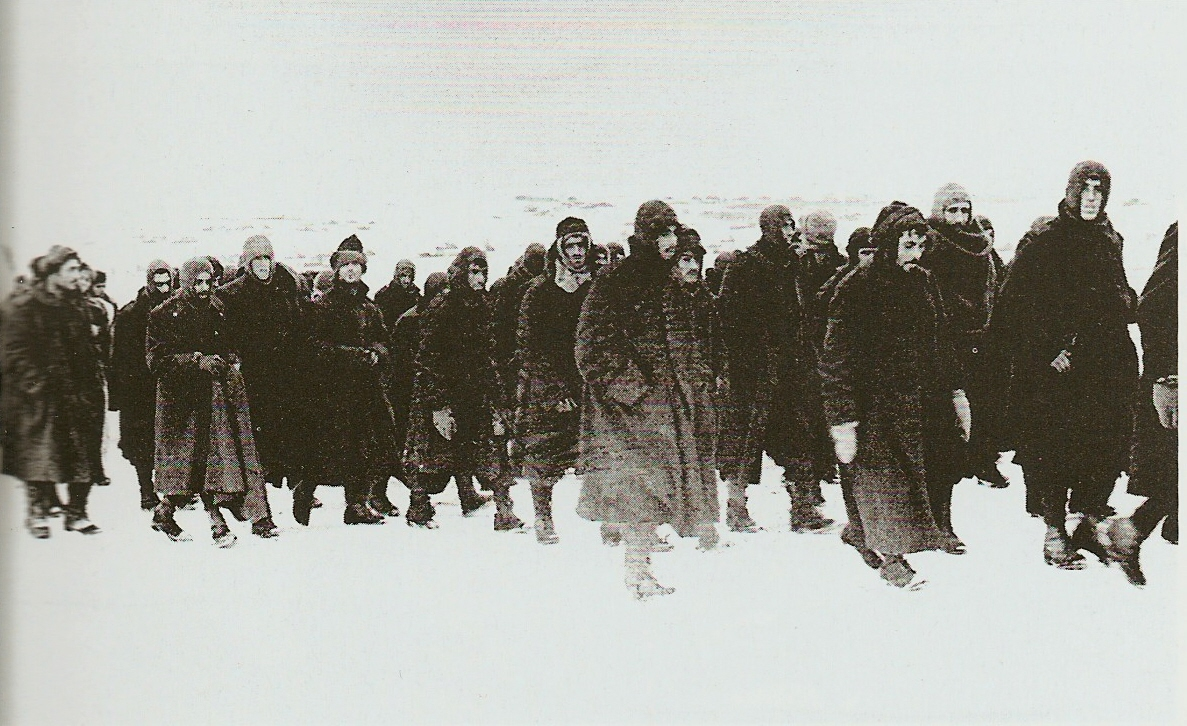
Italian POWs on the Eastern front (1943)

On 26 January 1943, the Alpini remnants breached the encirclement and reached new defensive positions set up to the west by the German Army. Many of the troops who managed to escape were frostbitten, critically ill, and deeply demoralized: for practical purposes, the Italian Army in Russia did not exist anymore by February 1943.

"The Italian participation in operations in Russia proved extremely costly. Losses of the 8th Army from 20 August 1942-20 February 1943 totalled 87,795 killed and missing (3,168 officers and 84,627 NCOs and soldiers) and 34,474 wounded and frostbitten (1,527 officers and 32,947 NCOs and soldiers). In March–April 1943, the remnants of the Army returned to Italy for rest and reorganization. Upon the surrender of Italy in September 1943, the Army was disbanded."

Officially, ARMIR losses were 114,520 of the original 235,000 soldiers

== See also ==
- Attack and Retreat
- Charge of the Savoia Cavalleria at Isbuscenskij
- Royal Italian Army during World War II
- Italian participation on the Eastern Front
- Italian prisoners of war in the Soviet Union
- List of military equipment of Germany's allies on the Eastern front
- Light Transport Brigade (Independent State of Croatia)

Armies with the Italian 8th Army and Army Group B at Stalingrad:

- German 2nd Army
- German 6th Army
- German 4th Tank Army
- Hungarian 2nd Army
- Romanian 3rd Army
- Romanian 4th Army

== Commanders ==
No.	Portrait	Commander	Took office	Left office	Time in office
1	Italo Gariboldi	General; Italo Gariboldi (1879–1970)	July 1942	January 1943	184 days

== Sources ==
- Roluti, Francesco (1947). "Il C.S.I.R., l'A.R.M.I.R. e la guerra in Russia" [The Italian Army and the War in Russia]. Rivista Aeronautica (in Italian): 725–734.
- Mollo, Andrew (1981). The Armed Forces of World War II. New York: Crown. ISBN 0-517-54478-4.
- Fellgiebel, Walther-Peer (2000). Die Träger des Ritterkreuzes des Eisernen Kreuzes 1939–1945 – Die Inhaber der höchsten Auszeichnung des Zweiten Weltkrieges aller Wehrmachtsteile [The Bearers of the Knight's Cross of the Iron Cross 1939–1945 — The Owners of the Highest Award of the Second World War of all Wehrmacht Branches] (in German). Friedberg, Germany: Podzun-Pallas. ISBN 978-3-7909-0284-6.
- Jowett, Philip S. (2000). The Italian Army 1940–45 (1): Europe 1940–1943. Oxford – New York: Osprey. ISBN 978-1-85532-864-8.
- Scianna, Bastian Matteo (2019). The Italian War on the Eastern Front, 1941–1943. Operations, Myths and Memories. ISBN 9783030265243.
