= 8th Alpini Regiment =

Active Italian Army mountain infantry unit

- 8° Reggimento Alpini
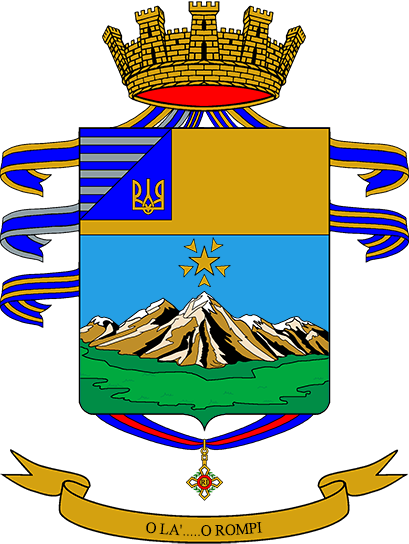
- Regimental coat of arms
- Active: 1 Oct. 1909 – 13 Sept. 1943; 15 April 1946 – today
- Country: Italy
- Branch: Italian Army
- Type: Mountain Infantry
- Part of: Alpine Brigade "Julia"
- Garrison/HQ: Venzone
- Motto: "O là.... o rompi"
- Anniversaries: 24 May 1915
- Decorations: 1× Military Order of Italy; 2× Gold Medals of Military Valor; 1× Silver Medal of Military Valor; 1× Silver Medal of Army Valor; 1× Bronze Medal of Army Valor; 1× Silver Cross of Army Merit

Insignia
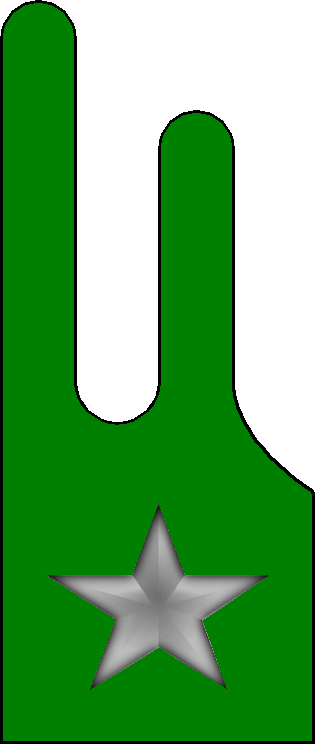
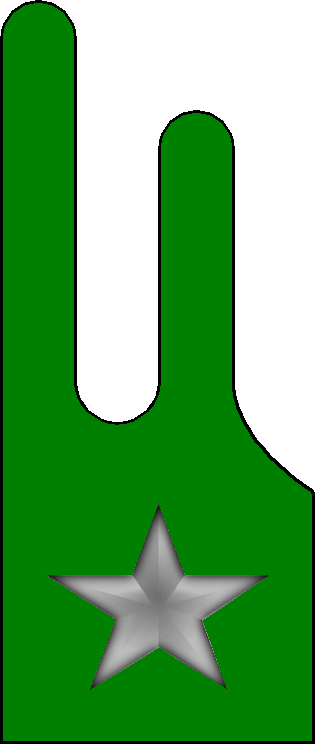
- Alpini gorget patches

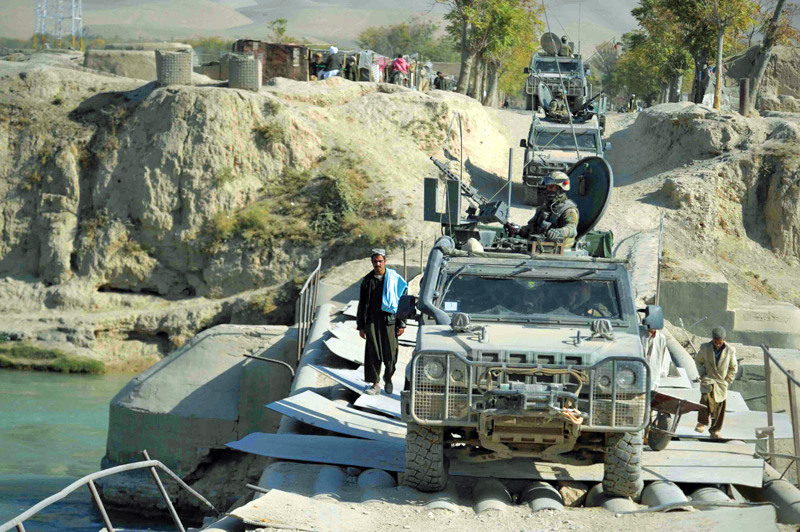
8th Alpini patrol in Afghanistan

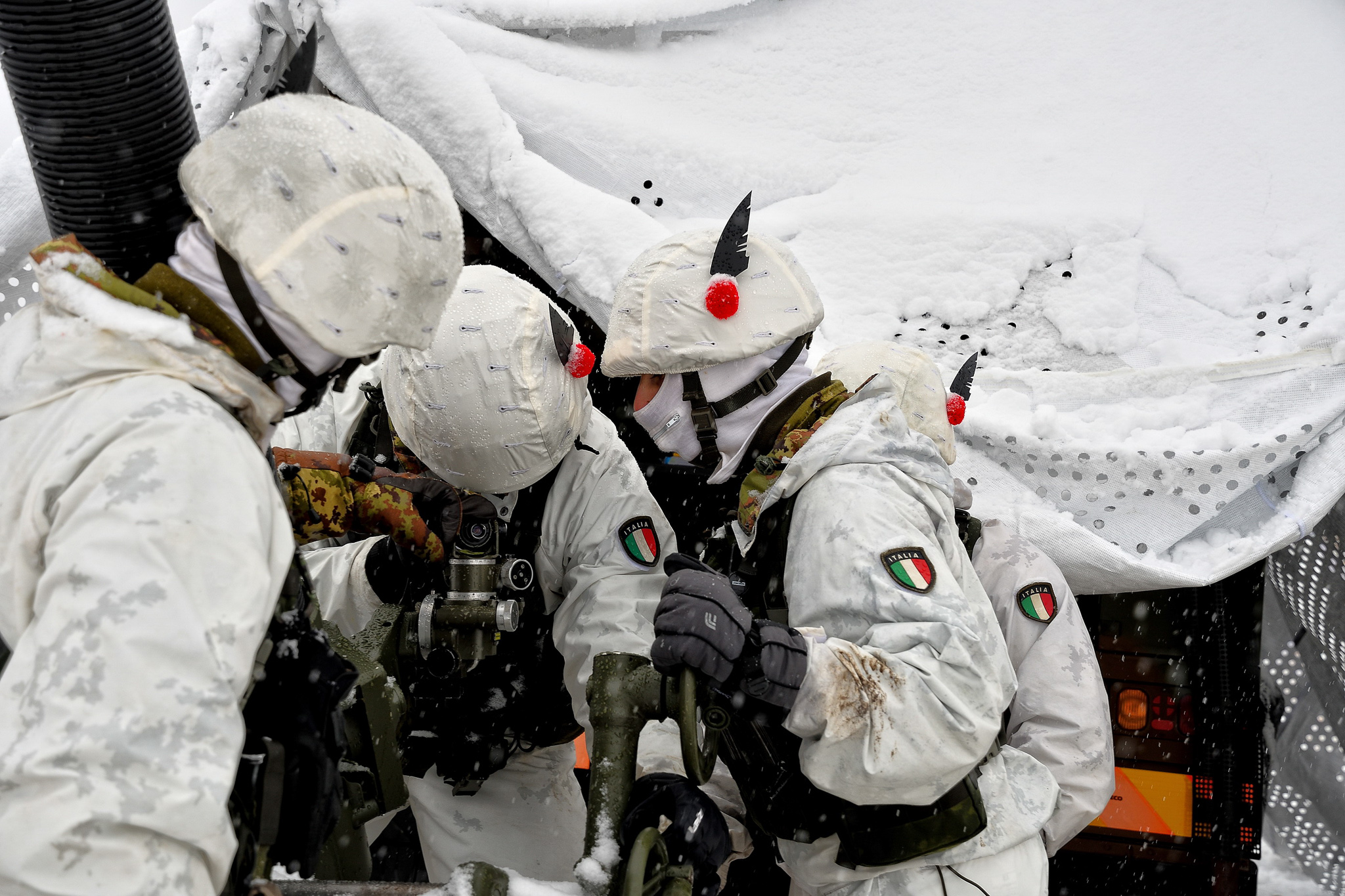
8th Alpini Regiment mortar team

The 8th Alpini Regiment (Italian: 8° Reggimento Alpini) is a mountain warfare regiment of the Italian Army based in Venzone in Friuli-Venezia Giulia. The regiment belongs to the Italian Army's Alpini infantry speciality and is assigned to the Alpine Brigade "Julia". On 1 October 1909, the Royal Italian Army formed the 8th Alpini Regiment by splitting the 7th Alpini Regiment. The new regiment's recruiting area consisted of the Carnic Alps, Carnic Prealps, and the Western side of the Julian Alps. During World War I the regiment expanded to ten battalions, which fought separately in the alpine areas of the Italian front.

In 1935 the regiment was assigned to the 3rd Alpine Division "Julia", with which it served during World War II in the Greco-Italian War, during which the division suffered heavy losses. For its service and sacrifice on the Greek Front the 8th Alpini Regiment was awarded Italy's highest military honor the Gold Medal of Military Valor. In summer 1942 the division was transferred to the Eastern Front in the Soviet Union, where it was destroyed in winter 1942–43 during the Soviet Operation Little Saturn. The remnants of the division were repatriated in spring 1943. For its service and sacrifice on the Eastern Front the 8th Alpini Regiment was awarded a second Gold Medal of Military Valor. On 8 September 1943, the Armistice of Cassibile was announced and five days later, on 13 September 1943, invading German forces disbanded the 8th Alpini Regiment.

On 15 April 1946, the 8th Alpini Regiment was reformed and in 1949 assigned to the Alpine Brigade "Julia". By 1964, the regiment had become the largest regiment of the Italian Army and consisted of five Alpini battalions. In 1975 the regiment was disbanded and its flag and traditions assigned to the Alpini Battalion "Gemona". In 1992, the regiment was reformed. The regiment's anniversary falls on 24 May 1915, the first day of the war on the Italian front, on which the regiment's Alpini battalions "Tolmezzo" and "Val Tagliamento" earned a shared Silver Medal of Military Valor for having taken and held the summits of Pal Piccolo, Freikofel and Pal Grande.

== History ==
On 1 October 1909, the 8th Alpini Regiment was formed in Udine. On the same day the regiment received the Alpini Battalion "Tolmezzo" and the Alpini Battalion "Gemona" from the 7th Alpini Regiment, and also formed the Alpini Battalion "Cividale", which consisted of the 16th and 20th Alpini companies, which had been ceded by the 2nd Alpini Regiment, and the newly formed 76th Alpini Company. The regiment's battalions, like all Alpini battalions at the time, were named for the cities and towns, where their base was located. Since 1886 Alpini soldiers and non-commissioned officers were issued thread tufts, called Nappina in Italian, which were clipped to the Cappello Alpino headdress, and colored white for the troops of a regiment's first battalion, red for the troops of a regiment's second battalion, green for the troops of a regiment's third battalion, and blue for the troops of a regiment's fourth battalion. After its formation the 8th Alpini Regiment consisted of the following units:

- 8th Alpini Regiment, in Udine
  - Alpini Battalion "Gemona", in Gemona
    - 69th, 70th, and 71st Alpini Company
  - Alpini Battalion "Tolmezzo", in Tolmezzo
    - 6th, 12th, and 72nd Alpini Company
  - Alpini Battalion "Cividale", in Cividale
    - 16th, 20th, and 76th Alpini Company

The regiment was assigned together with the 6th Alpini Regiment and 7th Alpini Regiment to the III Alpini Group, which on 9 August 1910 was renamed III Alpine Brigade.

=== Italo-Turkish War ===
On 29 September 1911 the Kingdom of Italy declared war against the Ottoman Empire and the regimental command of the 8th Alpini Regiment and the Alpini Battalion "Tolmezzo" were deployed to Libya for the Italo-Turkish War. In October 1912 the regimental command was used to form the 8th Special Regiment, which was led by Colonel Antonio Cantore. The regiment included the Alpini Battalion "Tolmezzo", as well as the 3rd Alpini Regiment's Alpini Battalion "Susa", the 5th Alpini Regiment's Alpini Battalion "Vestone", and the 7th Alpini Regiment's Alpini Battalion "Feltre". On 23 March 1913, the 8th Special Regiment fought in the Battle of Assaba, and on 18 June 1913 in the Battle of Ettangi against local rebel forces. For its conduct in the Battle of Assaba and its conduct in the Battle of Ettangi the Alpini Battalion "Tolmezzo", was awarded two Silver Medals of Military Valor, which were affixed to the flag of the 8th Alpini Regiment and added to the regiment's coat of arms. During the war the 8th Alpini Regiment also provided four officers and 250 troops to augment other units fighting in the war.

=== World War I ===
At the outbreak of World War I the Alpini speciality consisted of eight regiments, which fielded 26 battalions with 79 companies. Each Alpini battalion, with the exception of the Alpini Battalion "Verona", fielded three Alpini companies, while the Alpini Battalion "Verona" fielded four companies. Each company consisted of one captain, four lieutenants and 250 other ranks. After Italy's initial declaration of neutrality 38 additional Alpini companies were formed during the autumn of 1914 with men, who had completed their military service in the preceding four years. These companies were numbered from 80th to 117th and assigned to the existing Alpini battalions. During the same year the regimental command of the 8th Alpini Regiment moved from Udine to Venzone. In January 1915, each Alpini battalion formed a reserve battalion, with men, who had completed their military service at least four years, but not more than eleven years prior. These reserve battalions were named for a valley (Italian: Valle; abbreviated Val) located near their associated regular Alpini battalion's base, and the reserve battalions received the same Nappina as their associated regular Alpini battalion. The companies of the Valle battalions were numbered from 201st to 281st, with the numbers 227th, 233rd, 237th, 271st, and 273rd unused.

On 23 May 1915, Italy declared war on Austria-Hungary and at the time the 8th Alpini Regiment consisted of the following units:

- 7th Alpini Regiment, in Venzone
  - Alpini Battalion "Gemona"
    - 69th, 70th, 71st, and 97th Alpini Company
  - Alpini Battalion "Tolmezzo"
    - 6th, 12th, 72nd, and 109th Alpini Company
  - Alpini Battalion "Cividale"
    - 16th, 20th, 76th, and 110th Alpini Company
  - Alpini Battalion "Val Fella"
    - 269th and 270th (the 8th Alpini Company, originally assigned to the Alpini Battalion "Pieve di Teco", joined the battalion in 1916)
  - Alpini Battalion "Val Tagliamento"
    - 212th, 272nd, and 278th Alpini Company
  - Alpini Battalion "Val Natisone"
    - 216th, 220th, and 279th Alpini Company

By the end of 1915 the Alpini regiments began to form additional companies with recruits born in 1896. These new companies were numbered from 118th to 157th and were used, together with the 38 companies formed earlier, to form an additional reserve battalion for each regular battalion. These new battalions were named for a mountain (Italian: Monte) located near their associated regular Alpini battalion's base, and the reserve battalions received the same Nappina as their associated regular Alpini battalion. The 8th Alpini Regiment thus added the following Monte battalions:

- Alpini Battalion "Monte Canin"
  - 97th, 154th, and 155th Alpini Company
- Alpini Battalion "Monte Arvènis"
  - 109th, 152nd, and 153rd Alpini Company
- Alpini Battalion "Monte Matajur"
  - 110th, 156th, and 157th Alpini Company

As the mountainous terrain of the Italian front made the deployment of entire Alpini regiments impracticable, the regimental commands of the eight Alpini regiments were disbanded in March 1916. Likewise in April 1916 the pre-war alpine brigade commands were disbanded, and the personnel of the regimental commands and alpine brigade commands used to from twenty regiment-sized group commands and nine brigade-sized grouping commands. Afterwards Alpini battalions were employed either independently or assigned to groups, groupings, or infantry divisions as needed. On 16 May 1916, the Alpini Battalion "Pieve di Teco" of the 1st Alpini Regiment was disbanded and the battalion's 8th Alpini Company was reformed by the 8th Alpini Regiment to complement Alpini Battalion "Val Fella".

In February and March 1917 the Royal Italian Army formed twelve skiers battalions, each with two skiers companies. On 27 May 1917, the IX and XII Skiers battalions were disbanded and its personnel used to form the Alpini Battalion "Monte Nero", which was assigned to the 8th Alpini Regiment and consisted of the 294th, 295th, and 296th Alpini companies. The battalion was associated with the Alpini Battalion "Cividale" and therefore its troops wore a green Nappina.

In November and December 1917, after the disastrous Battle of Caporetto, the following retreat to the Piave river, and the subsequent First Battle of the Piave River and First Battle of Monte Grappa, the Royal Italian Army disbanded twenty Alpini battalions, which had suffered heavy casualties during the battles and retreat. Among the twenty battalions were the following battalions of the 8th Alpini Regiment:

- Alpini Battalion "Gemona"; battalion annihilated during the retreat and disbanded on 18 November 1917
- Alpini Battalion "Monte Canin"; battalion annihilated during the retreat and disbanded on 18 November 1917, with the survivors assigned to the Alpini Battalion "Tolmezzo"
- Alpini Battalion "Monte Nero"; battalion annihilated during the retreat and disbanded on 18 November 1917, with the survivors assigned to the Alpini Battalion "Tolmezzo"
- Alpini Battalion "Val Fella"; battalion annihilated during the retreat and disbanded on 9 December 1917

After the retreat to the Piave river the Alpini battalions "Val Tagliamento", "Val Natisone", and "Monte Matajur" fought in November and December 1917 in the First Battle of Monte Grappa, during which the three battalions suffered heavy casualties: the "Val Tagliamento" suffered 1,055 among killed, wounded, and missing, while the "Val Natisone" suffered 736 casualties, and the "Monte Matajur" 702 casualties. As the regiment's recruiting areas in Friuli had been occupied by Austro-Hungarian forces after the Battle of Caporetto, the three battalions were, together with four other Alpini battalions, disbanded on 15 February 1918, and the remaining personnel of the "Monte Matajur" was transferred to the Alpini Battalion "Tolmezzo".

During the war 145 officers and 5,987 soldiers of the regiment were killed in action, while 294 officers and 8,099 soldiers were wounded. For their service and sacrifice during the war five of the regiment's battalions shared two Silver Medals of Military Valor, while two battalions shared Bronze Medal of Military Valor:

- the Alpini battalions "Tolmezzo" and "Val Tagliamento" were awarded a shared Silver Medal of Military Valor for having taken and held the summits of Pal Piccolo, Freikofel and Pal Grande on 24 May – 4 July 1915, and for the "Val Tagliamento" to have taken Austrian positions on the Cima Busa Alta in the Lagorai range on 8–10 October 1916.
- the Alpini battalions "Gemona", "Monte Canin", and "Val Fella" were awarded a shared Silver Medal of Military Valor for their conduct from the start of the war on 24 May 1915 to the three battalions' destruction in the Battle of Caporetto on 6 November 1917.
- the Alpini battalions "Cividale" and "Val Natisone" were awarded a shared Bronze Medal of Military Valor for the "Cividale" battalion's conduct on Monte Cimone during the Battle of Asiago on 23–26 May 1916, and for the "Val Natisone" battalion's conduct during the same battle at Le Buse, Schiri, on Monte Giove, and Monte Chiesa between 10 May and 9 July 1916.

The two Silver Medals of Military Valor and Bronze Medals of Military Valor were affixed to the 8th Alpini Regiment's flag and added to the regiment's coat of arms.

=== Interwar years ===
After the end of the war the last of the Valle and Monte battalions, the Alpini Battalion "Monte Arvenis", was disbanded. On 1 September 1919, the regiment reformed the Alpini Battalion "Gemona". In 1921, the regiment returned for a short time to its old base Udine before moving to Tolmezzo. During the same year the regiment transferred the Alpini Battalion "Cividale" to the newly formed 9th Alpini Regiment and received in turn the Alpini Battalion "Verona" from the 6th Alpini Regiment. With the transfer of the battalions also the military awards of the battalions were transferred from regiment to regiment and affixed to the respective regimental flags. During 1921 the regiment, which consisted now of the Alpini battalions "Tolmezzo", "Gemona" and "Verona", was assigned to the 3rd Alpine Division, which also included the 7th Alpini Regiment, 9th Alpini Regiment, and 2nd Mountain Artillery Regiment. In 1923, the 3rd Alpine Division was replaced by the III Alpini Grouping, which in 1926 was reorganized as III Alpine Brigade. The brigade included, besides the 8th Alpini Regiment, also the 9th Alpini Regiment and 3rd Mountain Artillery Regiment. In November 1926, the Alpini Battalion "Cividale" returned to the regiment, which in turn returned the Alpini Battalion "Verona" to the 6th Alpini Regiment. During the same year the regiment left Tolmezzo and returned to its traditional base in Udine.

On 27 October 1934, the III Alpine Brigade was renamed III Superior Alpine Command. In December of the same year the command was given the name "Julio". On 31 October 1935, the III Superior Alpine Command "Julio" was reorganized as 3rd Alpine Division "Julia", which included the 7th Alpini Regiment, 8th Alpini Regiment, 9th Alpini Regiment, and 3rd Alpine Artillery Regiment "Julia". On 31 December 1935, the 7th Alpini Regiment was transferred to the newly formed 5th Alpine Division "Pusteria". In 1935–36 the regiment provided nine officers and 525 troops for the formation of the 10th Supply Column, which was sent to Eritrea for the Second Italo-Ethiopian War.

On 7 April 1939, Italy invaded Albania and by the middle of April the 3rd Alpine Division "Julia" moved to Northern Albania, where its regiments garrisoned the border with the Kingdom of Yugoslavia.

=== World War II ===
On 2 September 1939, one day after the German Invasion of Poland had begun, the Alpini battalions "Val Tagliamento", "Val Fella", and "Val Natisone" were reformed with reservists and assigned to the 1st Alpini Group. On 10 June 1940, the day Italy entered World War II, the regiment was in Albania and fielded 160 officers and 5,046 other ranks for a total strength of 5,206 men. The regiment had 23 horses, 1,242 mules and 109 transport vehicles at its disposal. The regiment's organization at the time was as follows:

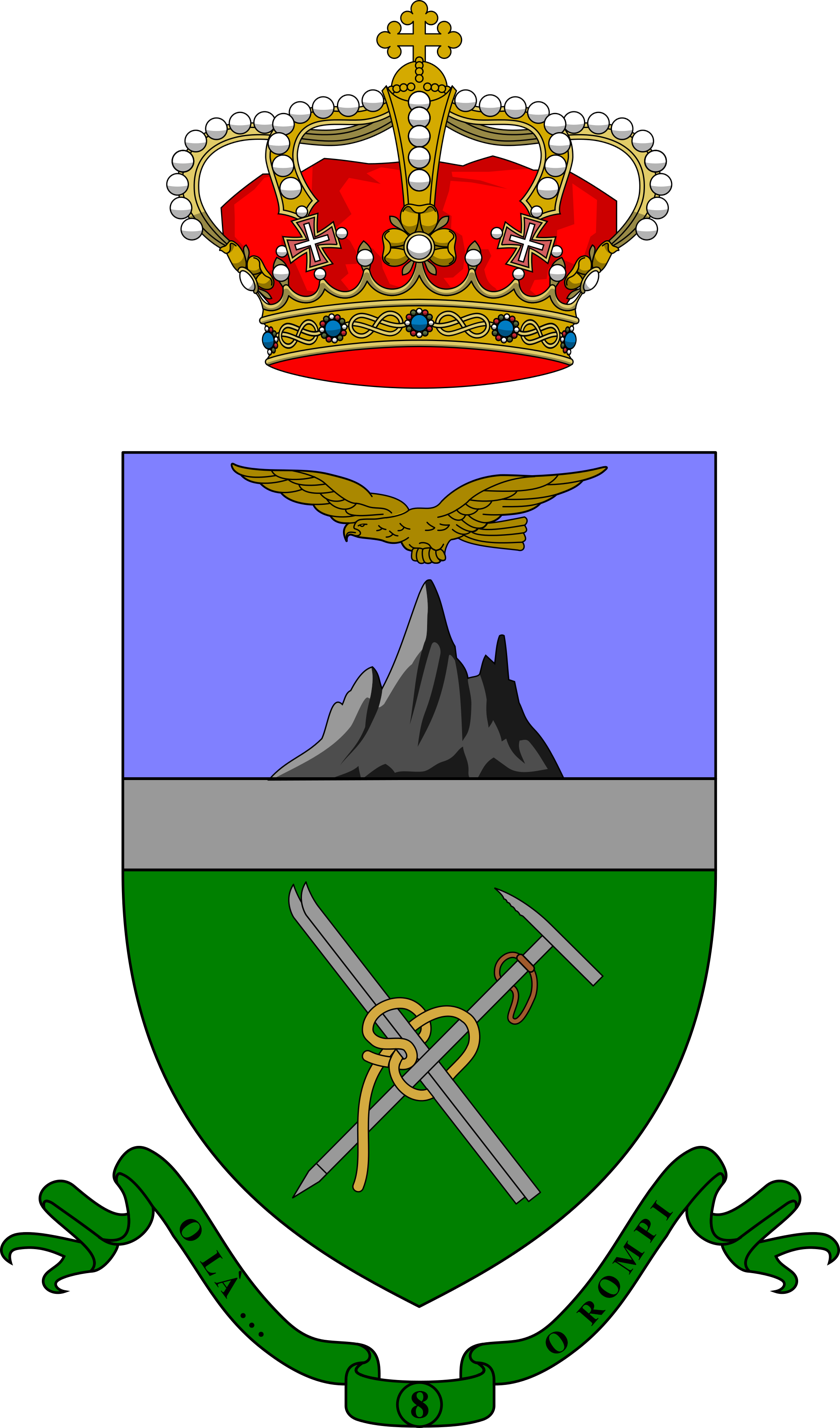
- 8th Alpini Regiment, in Udine
  - Regimental Command Company
  - Alpini Battalion "Gemona"
    - Command Company
    - 69th, 70th, and 71st Alpini Company
  - Alpini Battalion "Tolmezzo"
    - Command Company
    - 6th, 12th, and 72nd Alpini Company
  - Alpini Battalion "Cividale"
    - Command Company
    - 16th, 20th, and 76th Alpini Company
  - 8th Supply Section
  - 308th Medical Section (includes the 814th Field Hospital)
  - 28th Train Section (equipped with mules)

==== Greco-Italian War ====
In September 1940, the 3rd Alpine Division "Julia" moved from Northern to Southern Albania and took up positions along the border with the Kingdom of Greece for the upcoming Italian invasion of Greece. On 28 October 1940, Italian forces invaded Greece and the 3rd Alpine Division "Julia" engaged Greek forces in the Battle of Pindus, during which the "Julia" division suffered heavy casualties. In early November the Alpini battalions "Val Tagliamento", "Val Fella", and "Val Natisone" were sent to Albania, where the Alpini Battalion "Val Tagliamento" and the Alpini Battalion "Val Fella" reinforced the "Julia" division, while the Alpini Battalion "Val Natisone" was attached to the XXV Army Corps. On 10 November, the "Julia" division was taken out of the line, but only four days later it had to return to the front in the Berat sector, where it came under heavy Greek attacks until 8 December. On 23 December 1940, the "Julia" division was again attacked by the Greeks; the attack lasted until 31 December and forced the division to retreat to the Mali i Qarrishtës ridge in extreme weather conditions. On 8 January 1941, a Greek offensive in the Berat sector hit the "Julia" division hard and the following day the division fell back once more. On 21 January 1941, the division was down to a single regiment with three understrength battalions. The remains of the "Julia" were withdrawn and transferred to Mavrovo, near Vlorë, where the division was reformed and received the Alpini Battalion "Susa" from the 3rd Alpini Regiment as reinforcement.

At the end of February the division, now 10,500 men strong, was sent again to the first line; on 24 February it was deployed on Mali i Golikut and along the Zagoria Valley. On 28 February a new battle was fought in the Tepelenë sector; the "Julia" division, as the last Italian unit defending the town, was attacked by the 2nd Greek Division, but managed to hold the front while suffering heavy casualties. On 7 March the Greeks attacked on Mali i Golikut, and two days later they renewed their attack, causing heavy losses; by 11 March the Greek offensive ended without taking Tepelenë, and both the "Julia" division and the two Greek divisions involved in the attack (the 2nd and the 17th) were worn out by the heavy fighting and losses.

In April 1941, following the German invasion and Axis occupation of Greece, the division was transferred to the Corinth Canal area and occupied the Peloponnese. During the Greco-Italian War the division had suffered overall 9,317 casualties: 49 officers and 1,625 soldiers during October–November 1940, 153 officers and 3,644 soldiers between December 1940 and January 1941, and 116 officers and 3,730 soldiers between February and April 1941. For its service and sacrifice on the Greek front between 28 October 1940 and 23 April 1941 the 8th Alpini Regiment was awarded a Gold Medal of Military Valor. Separately the Alpini battalions "Val Fella" and "Val Tagliamento", which had been attached to the "Julia" division, were awarded a shared Silver Medal of Military Valor for their service and conduct on the Greek Front between 14 November 1940 and 23 April 1941. Similarly the Alpini Battalion "Val Natisone" was awarded a Silver Medal of Military Valor for its service on the Greek Front. All three medals were affixed to the 8th Alpini Regiment's flag and added to the regiment's coat of arms.

In December 1941, the regiment formed the XVI Replacements Battalion, which was assigned to the 7th Alpini Valley Group, which fought Yugoslav partisans in Croatia. On 15 February 1942, the regiment formed a support weapons company for each of its three battalions. These companies were equipped with Breda M37 machine guns, and 45mm Mod. 35 and 81mm Mod. 35 mortars. The 114th Support Weapons Company was assigned to the Alpini Battalion "Tolmezzo", the 115th Support Weapons Company to the Alpini Battalion "Cividale", and the 116th Support Weapons Company to the Alpini Battalion "Gemona".

==== Eastern Front ====
On 2 March 1942, the 3rd Alpine Division "Julia" was assigned, together with the 2nd Alpine Division "Tridentina" and 4th Alpine Division "Cuneense", to the Alpine Army Corps. The corps was assigned to the Italian 8th Army, which was readied to be deployed in summer 1942 to the Eastern Front. In preparation for the deployment to the Soviet Union the 8th Alpini Regiment's depot formed on 1 April 1942 the 41st Cannons Company, which was equipped with 47/32 mod. 35 anti-tank guns.

In June 1942, the depots of the 8th Alpini Regiment formed the VIII Replacements Battalion, which consisted of the 347th, 348th, and 349th Alpini companies, and the 162nd Support Weapons Company. On 20 June 1942, the VIII Replacements Battalion was assigned to the newly formed 103rd Alpini Marching Regiment, which was assigned to the III Marching Brigade of the 8th Marching Division. The division provided replacement troops for the 8th Army's regiments fighting on the Eastern Front.

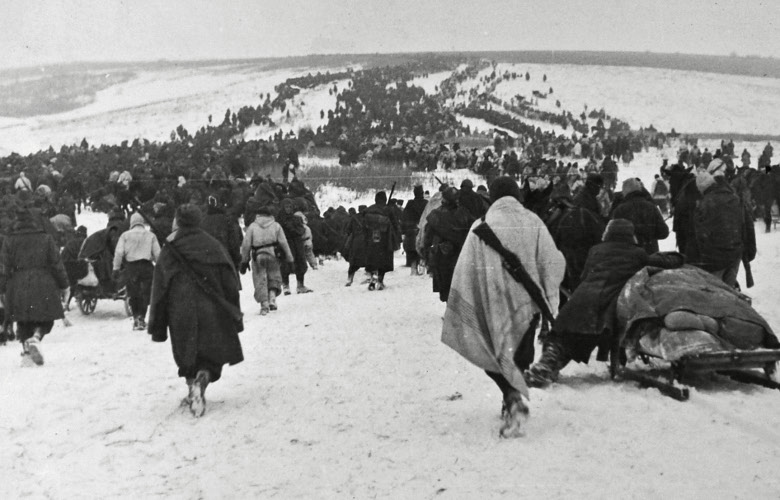
The Alpine Army Corps' retreat in Ukraine in January 1943

Consequently, the "Julia" division left Greece and was shipped back to Italy. In the night from 28 to 29 March 1942, the troop ship "Galilea", which carried the Alpini Battalion "Gemona" from Greece to Southern Italy, was torpedoed and sunk South off the island of Paxos in the Ionian Sea by the Royal Navy submarine HMS Proteus. Most of the battalion went down with the sinking ship: 21 of 23 officers, 18 of 27 non-commissioned officers and 612 of the battalion's 639 Alpini drowned. The battalion was quickly reformed and readied for the deployment to the Soviet Union.

In July 1942 the three alpine division arrived in Eastern Ukraine, from where they marched eastwards towards the Don river. The Italian 8th Army covered the left flank of the German 6th Army, which spearheaded the German summer offensive of 1942 towards Stalingrad. On 12 December 1942, the Red Army commenced Operation Little Saturn, which, in its first stage, attacked and encircled the Italian II Army Corps and XXXV Army Corps, to the southeast of the Alpine Army Corps. On 13 January 1943, the Red Army launched the second stage of Operation Little Saturn with the Voronezh Front encircling and destroying the Hungarian Second Army to the northwest of the Alpine Army Corps.

On the evening of 17 January 1943, the Alpine Army Corps commander, General Gabriele Nasci, ordered a full retreat. At this point only the 2nd Alpine Division "Tridentina" was still capable of conducting combat operations. The 40,000-strong mass of stragglers — Alpini and Italians from other commands, plus German and Hungarians — followed the "Tridentina", which led the way westwards to the new Axis lines. As the Soviets had already occupied every village, bitter battles had to be fought to clear the way. On the morning of 26 January 1943, the spearheads of the "Tridentina" reached the hamlet of Nikolayevka, occupied by the Soviet 48th Guards Rifle Division. The Soviets had fortified the railway embankment on both sides of the village. General Nasci ordered a frontal assault and by nightfall the troops of the "Tridentina" division had managed to break through the Soviet lines. The Italian troops continued their retreat, which was no longer contested by Soviet forces. On 1 February 1943 the remnants of the Alpine Army Corps reached Axis lines. For its bravery and sacrifice in the Soviet Union the 8th Alpini Regiment was awarded a Gold Medal of Military Valor, which was affixed to the regiment's flag and added to the regiment's coat of arms.

In early 1943, the regiment's depots in Italy formed the Alpini battalions "Gemona bis", "Tolmezzo bis", and "Cividale bis", which were deployed to the Isonzo valley to fight Yugoslav partisans. In June 1943, the three battalions were disbanded in June 1943 and their personnel assigned to the 8th Alpini Regiment. In July 1943, the Alpini battalions "Val Fella", "Val Tagliamento", and "Val Natisone" returned from occupied France and were disbanded, with their personnel assigned to the 8th Alpini Regiment. The 8th Alpini Regiment was still in the process of rebuilding its battalions, when the Armistice of Cassibile was announced on 8 September 1943. Five days later, on 13 September 1943, the regiment was disbanded by invading German forces.

=== Cold War ===
On 1 April 1946, an Alpini regiment was formed in Padua, which was initially designated 5th Alpini Regiment as it was formed within the area overseen by the V Territorial Military Command. The regiment consisted of the Alpini battalions "Feltre", "Tolmezzo", and "L'Aquila". The Alpini Battalion "Feltre" had been formed by renaming the 516th Guards Battalion, while the Alpini Battalion "Tolmezzo" had been formed by renaming the 517th Guards Battalion. Both guard battalions had served with the Italian Co-belligerent Army, as had the Alpini Battalion "L'Aquila", which was transferred from the Special Infantry Regiment "Legnano" to the new Alpini Regiment. On 15 April 1946, the regiment was renumbered as 8th Alpini Regiment and then moved from Padua to Belluno. On 31 July 1946, the regiment formed the 8th Mortar Company.

In May 1947, the regiment moved from Belluno to Tolmezzo. On 1 January 1948, the regiment formed a Recruits Training Battalion in Treviso. On 20 August 1948, the regiment reformed the Alpini Battalion "Cividale". On 30 April 1949, the Recruits Training Battalion was transferred to the Recruits Training Center in Trento, but on 1 May 1951 the battalion returned to the regiment, which ceded the battalion on 18 August of the same year to the V Territorial Military Command.

On 15 October 1949, the regiment was assigned to the newly formed Alpine Brigade "Julia". On 1 June 1956, the Alpini Battalion "Feltre" was renamed Alpini Battalion "Gemona". On 1 July 1950, the regiment formed a mortar company for each of its battalions. On 1 November 1962, the Alpini Battalion "Mondovì" of the 4th Alpini Regiment moved from Bra in Piedmont to Paluzza in Friuli-Venezia Giulia and joined the 8th Alpini Regiment. However the battalion continued to be manned by recruits drafted in Piedmont. Afterwards the regiment was the largest regiment of the Italian Army and consisted of the following units:

- 7th Alpini Regiment, in Tolmezzo
  - Command Company, in Tolmezzo
  - 8th Mortar Company, in Tolmezzo, with 107mm M30 mortars
  - Alpini Battalion "Gemona", in Pontebba
    - Command and Services Company
    - 69th, 70th, and 71st Alpini Company
    - 155th Mortar Company, with 81mm M29 mortars
  - Alpini Battalion "Tolmezzo", in Venzone
    - Command and Services Company
    - 6th, 12th, and 72nd Alpini Company
    - 114th Mortar Company, with 81mm M29 mortars
  - Alpini Battalion "Cividale", in Chiusaforte
    - Command and Services Company
    - 16th, 20th, and 76th Alpini Company
    - 115th Mortar Company, with 81mm M29 mortars
  - Alpini Battalion "L'Aquila", in Tarvisio
    - Command and Services Company
    - 93rd, 108th, and 143rd Alpini Company
    - 119th Mortar Company, with 81mm M29 mortars
  - Alpini Battalion "Mondovì", in Paluzza
    - Command and Services Company
    - 9th, 10th, and 11th Alpini Company
    - 103rd Mortar Company, with 81mm M29 mortars

On 31 December 1964, the 8th Mortar Company was disbanded. On 31 December 1974, the Alpini Battalion "Mondovì" was reduced to a reserve unit.

During the 1975 army reform the army disbanded the regimental level and newly independent battalions were granted for the first time their own flags. On 1 June 1975, the Alpini Battalion "Mondovì" was disbanded. On 31 August 1975, the Alpini Battalion "Gemona" in Pontebba and the Alpini Battalion "L'Aquila" in Tarvisio were disbanded. The next day, on 1 September 1975, the two battalions were reformed: the Alpini Battalion "Gemona" in Tarvisio with the personnel of the Alpini Battalion "L'Aquila", and the Alpini Battalion "L'Aquila" as an autonomous unit in L'Aquila, with the personnel of the Recruits Training Battalion "Julia", which had been disbanded a day earlier in that city. On the same day, 1 September 1975, a new recruits training battalion was formed in Tolmezzo with personnel drawn from the disbanded Alpini Battalion "Gemona". The new battalion was designated Alpini Battalion "Vicenza". On 30 September 1975, the 8th Alpini Regiment was disbanded and the next day its battalions became autonomous units and were assigned to the Alpine Brigade "Julia", which now included the following Alpini battalions:

- Alpini Battalion "Gemona", in Tarvisio
- Alpini Battalion "Tolmezzo", in Venzone
- Alpini Battalion "Vicenza", in Tolmezzo
- Alpini Battalion "Cividale", in Chiusaforte
- Alpini Battalion "L'Aquila", in L'Aquila

After the reform the battalions "Gemona", "Tolmezzo", "Cividale", and "L'Aquila" consisted of a command, a command and services company, three Alpini companies, and a heavy mortar company with eight 120mm Mod. 63 mortars. Each of the four Alpini battalions fielded now 950 men (45 officers, 96 non-commissioned officers, and 809 soldiers).

On 12 November 1976 the President of the Italian Republic Giovanni Leone assigned with decree 846 the flag and traditions of the 8th Alpini Regiment to the Alpini Battalion "Gemona", and the flag and traditions of the 9th Alpini Regiment to the Alpini Battalion "Vicenza". With the same decree the Alpini battalions "Cividale", "Tolmezzo", and "L'Aquila" were granted a new flag. At the same time the medals and military honors awarded to the "Cividale" and "Tolmezzo" battalions were transferred from the flag of the 8th Alpini Regiment, respectively in case of the "L'Aquila" battalion from the flag of the 9th Alpini Regiment, to the three battalions' new flags. Medals and military honors awarded to the entire 8th Alpini Regiment, respectively 9th Alpini Regiment, were duplicated for the new flags of the three battalions. The awards were also added to the battalions' newly created coat of arms.

For its conduct and work after the 1976 Friuli earthquake the Alpini Battalion "Gemona" was awarded a Bronze Medal of Army Valor, which was affixed to the battalion's flag and added to the battalion's coat of arms.

=== Recent times ===
On 7 August 1992, the Alpini Battalion "Gemona" lost its autonomy and the next day the battalion entered the reformed 8th Alpini Regiment. During the same year the "Julia" brigade's Anti-tank Company was disbanded and its personnel, with their TOW anti-tank guided missiles, assigned to the mortar companies of the brigade's battalions. Consequently, the 8th Alpini Regiment's 155th Mortar Company was renamed 155th Support Weapons Company. On 9 October 1992, the Alpini Battalion "Cividale" lost its autonomy and the next day the battalion entered the newly formed 15th Alpini Regiment. On 4 February 1993, the Alpini Battalion "Tolmezzo" lost its autonomy and the next day the battalion entered the newly formed 14th Alpini Regiment. Between November 1993 and April 1994 the 8th Alpini Regiment served with the United Nations Operation in Mozambique. For its service in Mozambique the regiment was awarded a Silver Cross of Army Merit, which was affixed to the regiment's flag.

On 11 November 1995, the 15th Alpini Regiment was disbanded and on 16 November the flag of the regiment transferred to the Shrine of the Flags in the Vittoriano in Rome. On 1 November 1997, the 8th Alpini Regiment moved from Tarvisio to Cividale. In 2001 the regiment's 155th Support Weapons Company was split into the 155th Mortar Company and the 216th Anti-tank Company "Val Natisone".

On 14 October 2005, the command of the 14th Alpini Regiment, the command of the Alpini Battalion "Tolmezzo", as well as the 72nd Alpini Company and 212th Anti-tank Company "Val Tagliamento", were disbanded in Venzone, while the "Tolmezzo" battalion's 114th Mortar Company was renumbered 115th Mortar Company. On the same date, the Alpini Battalion "Gemona" disbanded its 70th and 71st Alpini Company, as well as battalion's Command and Logistic Support Company and the 155th Mortar Company. Furthermore, on the same date the Alpini Battalion "Gemona" was renamed Alpini Battalion "Tolmezzo". After the reorganization the 8th Alpini Regiment was organized as follows:

- 8th Alpini Regiment, in Cividale
  - Command and Logistic Support Company, in Venzone
  - Alpini Battalion "Tolmezzo", in Cividale
    - 6th Alpini Company, in Venzone
    - 12th Alpini Company, in Venzone
    - 69th Alpini Company, in Cividale
    - 115th Mortar Company, in Venzone
    - 216th Anti-tank Company "Val Natisone", in Cividale

This reorganization was undertaken to keep at least one company of each of the traditional battalions of the 8th Alpini Regiment in active service: with the 6th and 12th Alpini companies drawn from the Alpini Battalion "Tolmezzo", the 69th Alpini Company drawn from the Alpini Battalion "Gemona", the 115th Mortar Company drawn from the Alpini Battalion "Cividale", and the 216th Anti-tank Company "Val Natisone" drawn from the Alpini Battalion "Val Natisone".

From November 2005 to March 2006, the regiment led the Provincial Reconstruction Team in Herat in Afghanistan. From August 2007 to January 2008, the regiment's 6th Alpini Company was attached to the 5th Alpini Regiment for that regiment's deployment to Kabul. In October 2008, the 8th Alpini Regiment deployed once more to Afghanistan, with the 12th Alpini Company in Herat, and the 6th Alpini Company and 216th Anti-tank Company alternating every month between the Flying Support Base at Herat International Airport and the Forward Operating Base in Bala Murghab. For one month the 216th Anti-tank Company also deployed to the Forward Operating Base in Delaram. During this deployment the regiment's patrols regularly were engaged in firefights with Taliban forces. In April 2009, the regiment returned to Italy. For its conduct in Herat province between 9 October 2008 and 2 April 2009 the regiment was awarded a Silver Medal of Army Valor, which was affixed to the regiment's flag and added to the regiment's coat of arms.

In 2011, the 216th Anti-tank Company "Val Natisone" was disbanded and its personnel integrated into the 69th Alpini Company, while the 115th Mortar Company added an anti-tank platoon and was renamed 115th Maneuver Support Company. In 2016, the regiment left the base in Cividale and is since then based in Venzone.

== Organization ==
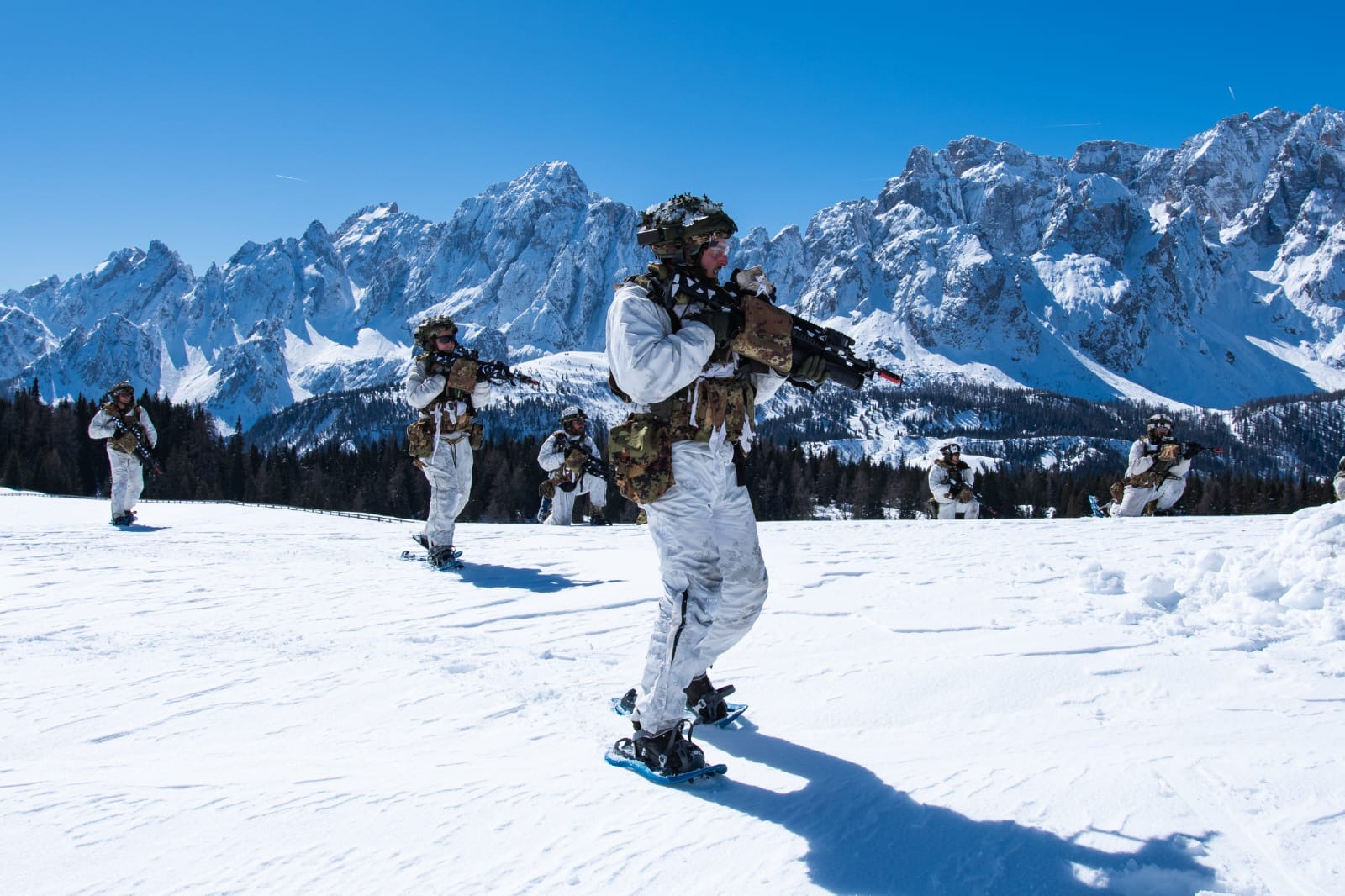
8th Alpini Regiment patrol during exercise Picca d’Acciaio in March 2025

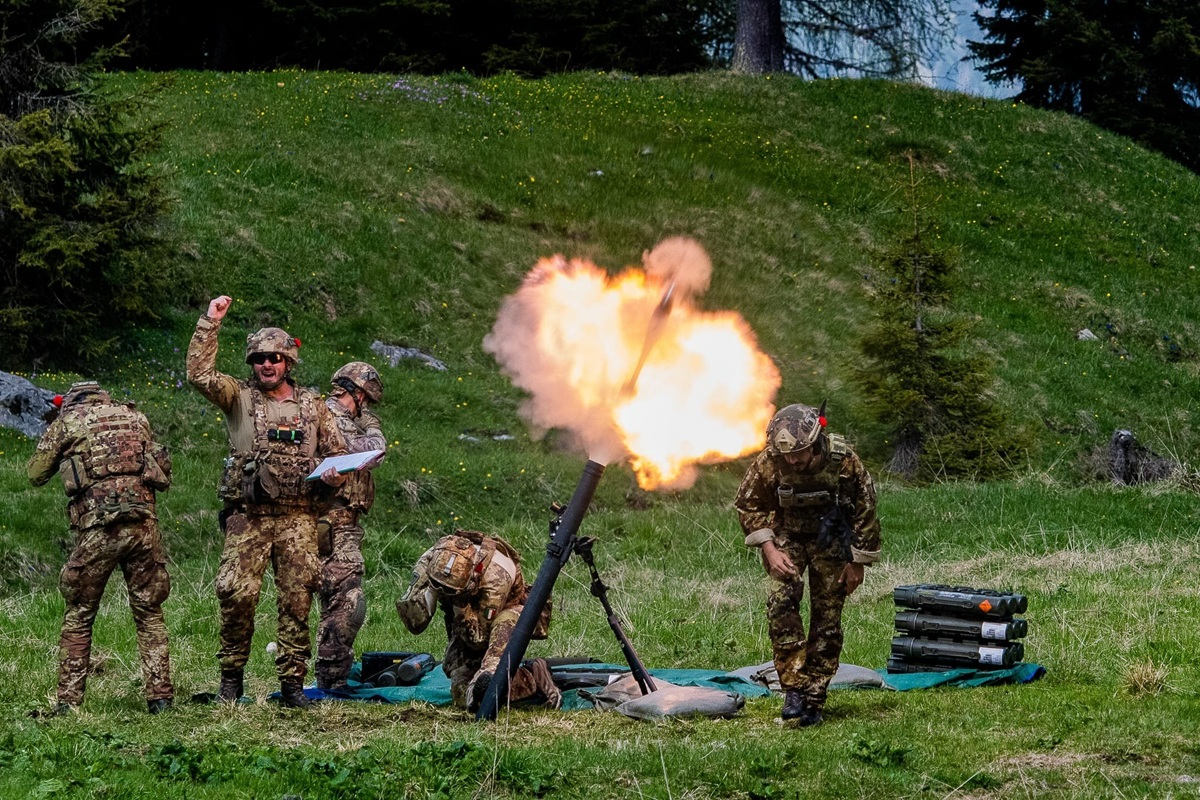
8th Alpini Regiment mortar squad firing a 81mm mortar during exercise Alabarda D'argento 2026

As of 2024 the 8th Alpini Regiment is organized as follows:

- 8th Alpini Regiment, in Venzone
  - Command and Logistic Support Company
  - Alpini Battalion "Tolmezzo"
    - 6th Alpini Company
    - 12th Alpini Company
    - 69th Alpini Company
    - 115th Maneuver Support Company

The Alpini companies are equipped with Bv 206S tracked all-terrain carriers and Lince light multirole vehicles. The maneuver support company is equipped with 120 mm mortars and Spike MR anti-tank guided missiles.

== See also ==
- Alpine Brigade "Julia"
