= Umberto Ricagno =

Italian general

- Born: 14 March 1890; Sezzadio, Kingdom of Italy
- Died: 17 July 1964 (aged 74); Rome, Italy
- Military career
- Allegiance: Kingdom of Italy; Italy
- Branch: Royal Italian Army; Italian Army
- Service years: 1910–1954
- Rank: Lieutenant general
- Commands: "Vestone" Alpini Battalion; 5th Alpini Regiment; 1st Alpini Regiment; 3rd Alpine Division Julia; IX Territorial Defence Command
- Conflicts: Italo-Turkish War; World War I; Battles of the Isonzo; Italian invasion of Albania; World War II; Greco-Italian War; Axis invasion of Yugoslavia; Italian participation in the Eastern Front; Operation Little Saturn
- Awards: Bronze Medal of Military Valor (twice); War Cross for Military Valor; Military Order of Italy; Order of the Crown of Italy; Order of Saints Maurice and Lazarus; Order of Merit of the Italian Republic

Umberto Ricagno (14 March 1890 – 17 July 1964) was an Italian general during World War II.

== Biography ==
He was born in Sezzadio, province of Alessandria, on March 14, 1890. He attended the Royal Academy of Infantry and Cavalry in Modena and graduated in 1910 as second lieutenant, assigned to the Alpini corps. In 1911–1912 he participated in the Italo-Turkish War, fighting in the ranks of the "Fenestrelle" Alpini Battalion of the 3rd Alpini Regiment, being awarded a Bronze Medal of Military Valor and a War Cross for Military Valor. He then took part in the First World War as captain in command of the 27th Alpini Company, distinguishing himself in 1915 on Mount Krn, for which he was decorated with a second Bronze Medal for military valor, and then on Vršič Pass and on Monte Rosso. In 1917 he was promoted to major and assigned to the Staff Officer corps.

In 1920, he became commander of the "Vestone" Alpini Battalion of the 6th Alpini Regiment; after promotion to lieutenant colonel in 1926, he became a member of the General Staff Corps and taught at the Army War School between 1928 and 1931. Between 1932 and 1934 he served in Albania as chief of staff of the "Koova" Division of the Royal Albanian Army. Having then become colonel, he was commander of the 5th Alpini Regiment and later of the 1st Alpini Regiment.

He then served as chief of staff of the 7th Infantry Division "Leonessa" and later of the 4th Alpine Division Cuneense; in April 1939, during and after the invasion of Albania, he became chief of staff of the Albania Army Corps, later renamed High Command of Troops of Albania, commanding from the base in Bari. In October 1940 he was promoted to brigadier general and was subsequently attached to the XXVI Army Corps and then to the Albania General Headquarters until November. After a brief period at the Ministry of War, in December he was attached to the Alpine Army Corps and then to the IX Army Corps, before becoming once again chief of staff of the Albania General Headquarters. From March to April 1941 he participated in operations against Yugoslavia with the XIV Army Corps.

On 19 August 1941, he became commander of the 3rd Alpine Division Julia, at the head of which in July 1942 he left for the Eastern Front as part of the ARMIR. The Division was encircled and destroyed during Operation Little Saturn in January 1943, and Ricagno was captured by the Soviets in Valuyki on January 27, a mere two days after his promotion to major general. He was taken to the Lubyanka prison in Moscow and later transferred to a prisoner-of-war camp, spending the next seven years in Soviet captivity and only returning to Italy on May 16, 1950.

He then returned to service in the postwar Italian Army, having been promoted to lieutenant general on January 1, 1947, while still in captivity, and awarded the Knight's Cross of the Military Order of Italy. He was assigned to the territorial command of Bari (IX Territorial Defence Command), and in 1954 he was appointed General Commissioner for Honours to the Fallen in War. After retiring from the Army, he was president of the Rome section of the National Alpini Association for six years. On 2 June 1963, he was awarded the title of Knight of the Grand Cross of the Order of Merit of the Italian Republic.

He died in Rome on July 17, 1964. His funeral took place in Sezzadio with full military honors, in the presence of Minister of Defense Giulio Andreotti and of the war flag of the 8th Alpini Regiment.
