= Etelvoldo Pascolini =

Italian general (1884–1956)

- Born: 8 November 1884; San Costanzo, Kingdom of Italy
- Died: 2 June 1956 (aged 71); Turin, Italy
- Military career
- Allegiance: Kingdom of Italy; Italy
- Branch: Royal Italian Army; Italian Army
- Rank: Major General
- Commands: XXVI Complements Battalion; 1st Colonial Infantry Regiment; Durrës garrison 156th Infantry Division Vicenza
- Conflicts: Italo-Turkish War; World War I; Battles of the Isonzo; Second Italo-Ethiopian War; World War II; Greco-Italian War; Italian participation in the Eastern Front; Operation Little Saturn
- Awards: Gold Medal of Military Valor; Silver Medal of Military Valor (three times); Bronze Medal of Military Valor (twice); Military Order of Savoy; Order of the Crown of Italy; Order of Saints Maurice and Lazarus

Etelvoldo Pascolini (8 November 1884 – 2 June 1956) was an Italian general during World War II.

== Biography ==
He was born in San Costanzo, province of Pesaro, on November 8, 1884, the son of Augusto Pascolini and Filomena Alessandri. After enlisting in the Royal Italian Army he entered the Royal Military Academy of Infantry and Cavalry of Modena as an officer cadet, graduating with the rank of infantry second lieutenant on 19 September 1910, assigned to 53rd Infantry Regiment "Umbria". Starting from October 1911 he participated in the Italo-Turkish War with the 23rd Infantry Regiment "Como", remaining in Libya until May 1913. When the Kingdom of Italy entered the First World War on May 24, 1915, he was serving in the 73rd Infantry Regiment "Lombardia", with the rank of Lieutenant; he participated in the fighting on the Isonzo Front and in September 1915 he was awarded a Bronze Medal of Military Valor for having rescued a wounded soldier under enemy fire in no man's land. In November 1915, during the Fourth Battle of the Isonzo, he led his company and later his battalion during the fighting on Sabotin and was seriously wounded in combat in Oslavia, near Gorizia, being awarded another bronze medal, which was subsequently changed to a silver medal for military valor. He spent two years recovering, after which he returned to active duty at his request, despite having been declared a disabled veteran, with the rank of major.

On February 1, 1927, he was promoted to lieutenant colonel by choice, and from March 1932 he was assigned to the Royal Corps of Colonial Troops of Somalia, holding various commands in the colony until September 1934. After returning to Italy he was assigned to the 63rd Infantry Regiment "Cagliari", but in October 1935 he left to fight in the Second Italo-Ethiopian War as commander of the XXVI Complements Battalion of the 26th Infantry Division Assietta. Having been promoted to colonel, he remained in Abyssinia after the end of the war, as commander of the 1st Colonial Infantry Regiment, tasked with completing colonial police operations against Arbegnoch groups led by Desta Damtew; in January 1937 he led his groupment of Libyan battalions in the battle that resulted in the annihilation of Damtew's remaining forces. For his activity in East Africa Pascolini was decorated with two silver medals for military valor, one of which was later changed to the granting of the Knight's Cross of the Military Order of Savoy, and was promoted to brigadier general on 30 June 1939, returning to Italy in January 1940. He was then attached to the Turin Territorial Defence Command until May 1940, and then to the Directorate-General of Logistical Service.

After Italy's entry into the Second World War on June 10, 1940, he was sent to the Albanian front at his own request, being appointed commander of the garrison of Durrës, and from there, in November 1942, he was transferred to the Eastern Front, once again at his request, where he was attached to the 8th Army (ARMIR). He was initially given command of the rear area of the ARMIR, but on 8 December 1942 he assumed command of the 156th Infantry Division Vicenza, replacing Major General Enrico Broglia. This division was deployed in the rear of the Alpine Army Corps, with garrison and occupation duties, and was not meant for frontline service; on 16 December, however, due to the worsening situation after the start of Operation Little Saturn, it was moved on the frontline, south of Pavlovsk, taking up position between the 2nd Alpine Division Tridentina (general Luigi Reverberi) and the 4th Alpine Division Cuneense (general Umberto Ricagno). In January 1943 "Vicenza" was overwhelmed by the Soviet advance, and annihilated during the subsequent retreat through the steppe; on 26 January Pascolini, who had personally led several breakout attempts during the retreat, was captured near Valuyki by Cossack units along with the remnants of his division. He remained a prisoner of war in the Soviet Union until May 1950, when he was released and repatriated along with Generals Ricagno and Battisti and thirty South Tyrolean SS soldiers.

After his return, Pascolini was promoted to major general and awarded a Gold Medal of Military Valor for his behaviour during the fighting on the Eastern Front and the march through the steppe; the medal was pinned on his chest by his son Stefano, a naval officer, who had also been awarded the gold medal for a MAS action in the Sicilian Channel in 1941. Pascolini was then placed on absolute leave in January 1951; he died in Turin on 2 June 1956.
