= Gaetano Tavoni =

Italian officer

- Born: 6 February 1889; Vignola, Kingdom of Italy
- Died: 16 March 1941 (aged 52); Rome, Kingdom of Italy
- Military career
- Allegiance: Kingdom of Italy
- Branch: Royal Italian Army
- Service years: 1906–1941
- Rank: Colonel
- Commands: 9th Alpini Regiment; 3rd Alpine Division Julia (acting)
- Conflicts: World War I; White War; Albanian Front; Italian invasion of Albania; World War II; Greco-Italian War; Battle of Pindus
- Awards: Gold Medal of Military Valor (posthumous); Bronze Medal of Military Valor

Gaetano Tavoni (6 February 1889 – 16 March 1941) was an Italian Alpini officer, commander of the 9th Alpini Regiment. He was mortally wounded during the Greco-Italian War and posthumously awarded the Gold Medal of Military Valor.

== Biography ==
He enlisted in the Royal Italian Army in 1906, with the 6th Bersaglieri Regiment, and after attending the Military Academy of Modena he was commissioned as second lieutenant in 1911. During the First World War he initially fought in the Carnic Alps as a captain in the LXIII Battalion of the 16th Bersaglieri Regiment, being wounded on the Pal Piccolo on 27 March 1916 in an action which earned him the Bronze Medal of Military Valor. After recovering he was sent to the Albanian front, where in 1917 he was promoted to major and given command of the 2nd Battalion, 204th Infantry Regiment "Tanaro".

He was later assigned to the 9th Alpini Regiment; in 1927 he became lieutenant colonel and assigned to the command of the 3rd Alpine Brigade. In 1932 he returned to the 9th Alpini Regiment, of which he assumed command in 1939, after promotion to colonel, being transferred to Albania shortly after its occupation in April. From 7 August to 21 September 1940 he was acting commander of the 3rd Alpine Division Julia, of which the 9th Alpini Regiment was part.

After the outbreak of the Greco-Italian War, Tavoni led the 9th Alpini Regiment in the bitter fighting on the Pindus (where the Julia was attacked and almost cut off by three Greek divisions, suffering heavy losses), the Qarrisht' e Fratarit and the Mal Topojan. On 31 December 1940 he complained to the divisional command about friendly fire from the Regia Aeronautica, writing that "the Macchi 200 aircraft, which yesterday distinguished themselves in strafing our troops on the frontline, today distinguished themselves in strafing our rear". On 8 January 1941, "after leading his regiment through six weeks of hell", he was seriously wounded in the head by shrapnel from a grenade that hit his command post during an attack on the Mal Topojan, and was subsequently repatriated. He died from his wounds at the Celio military hospital in Rome on 16 March 1941, and was posthumously awarded the Gold Medal of Military Valor.
