= Mitrofanovka =

Mitrofanovka Митрофановка
- Selo
- Location within Bashkortostan Location within Russia
- Coordinates: 55°37′N 57°55′E
- Country: Russia
- Region: Bashkortostan
- District: Duvansky District
- Time zone: UTC+5:00

Mitrofanovka (Russian: Митрофановка) is a rural locality (a selo) in Mikhaylovsky Selsoviet, Duvansky District, Bashkortostan, Russia. The population was 207 as of 2010. There are 4 streets.

== Geography ==
Mitrofanovka is located 28 km northwest of Mesyagutovo (the district's administrative centre) by road. Yelantub is the nearest rural locality.
