= Enrico Pezzi (general) =

Italian Air Force general

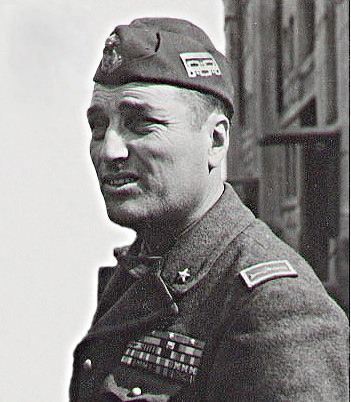
- Born: 22 May 1897; Collevecchio, Rieti, Kingdom of Italy
- Died: 29 December 1942 (aged 45); Chertkovo, Soviet Union
- Military career
- Allegiance: Kingdom of Italy
- Branch: Royal Italian Army; Regia Aeronautica
- Service years: 1918–1942
- Rank: Air Brigade General
- Commands: 24th Squadron; 23rd Fighter Group; XLV Bombing Group; 62nd Air Observation Group; 20th Air Observation Wing; Sparrowhawk Wing; 41st Land Bombardment Wing; 9th Air Brigade "Leone"; Italian Air Force in Russia
- Conflicts: World War I; Pacification of Libya; Italian occupation of Ethiopia; Spanish Civil War; World War II; Siege of Malta; North African campaign; Italian participation in the Eastern Front; Operation Little Saturn †
- Awards: Gold Medal of Military Valor (posthumous); Silver Medal of Military Valor (five times); War Cross of Military Valor; War Merit Cross (six times); Military Order of Savoy; Order of the Crown of Italy; Order of Saints Maurice and Lazarus; Colonial Order of the Star of Italy; Order of the German Eagle; Iron Cross First Class; Iron Cross Second Class

Enrico Pezzi (22 May 1897 – 29 December 1942) was an Italian Air Force general during World War II. The youngest general in the Regia Aeronautica, he is best known for leading the Italian Air Force in Russia, where he was killed during a rescue mission in late 1942, being posthumously awarded the Gold Medal of Military Valor. He was the brother of Mario Pezzi, also a general in the Regia Aeronautica.

== Biography ==
He was born in Collevecchio, province of Rieti, on 22 May 1897, from a family with long military traditions; his father Luigi was a general in the Royal Italian Army, and his brothers Pio (killed in action on the Karst Plateau during World War I) and Mario were both officers. He began his military career in April 1917, when, after attending the Military School of Rome, he was admitted to the Royal Military Academy of Artillery and Engineers in Turin to attend the reserve officer's course of the Royal Italian Army. He was promoted to second lieutenant in February 1918 and assigned to the field artillery, with which he participated in the last months of the First World War. Attracted by the world of aviation, in July 1923 he was admitted to attend the airplane observer course, obtaining the license in January of the following year, and in July 1924 he was transferred to the newly established Regia Aeronautica with the rank of lieutenant.

His first deployment was in the pacification of Tripolitania, where he earned a War Merit Cross and a Silver Medal of Military Valor; after participating in numerous reconnaissance and strafing missions against the Senussi guerrillas, he was forced to land in Senussi-controlled territory by an engine breakdown and was captured, but persuaded his captors to release him and submit to Italy. In June 1926 he was promoted to captain and given command of the 28th Squadron of the 62nd Air Reconnaissance Group, based at the Pisa San Giusto airport, obtaining the following year the pilot license at the Cerveteri flight school, where he had been temporarily seconded. Returning to Pisa in May 1928, he became a pilot of Ansaldo A.300 aircraft. From 28 May 1928 he commanded the 24th Squadron until 10 October 1931; in 1929 he married Miss Elena Queirolo, daughter of Senator Giovan Battista Queirolo.

In October 1931, after promotion to Major, he was given command of the 23rd Fighter Group, based at the Bresso Airfield, and in July 1932 of the XLV Group of the 14th Daytime Bombing Wing, based in Ferrara. He returned to Pisa in April 1934 to take command of the 62nd Air Observation Group, as well as of the San Giusto air base. He held this post until September 1936, when, after promotion to lieutenant colonel, he took part in operations in East Africa, as commander of the advanced base of Gura, Eritrea, being awarded another Silver Medal of military valor for his role in the conquest of Dembidolo, where he personally landed the first Italian troops in a makeshift airfield.

He was repatriated in December 1936 and in November 1937, a month after being promoted to colonel for war merits, he was given command of the 20th Air Observation Wing, stationed in Centocelle. From December of the following year, at the head of the "Sparrowhawk" Wing of the Aviazione Legionaria, he fought in the Spanish Civil War, where he earned a third silver medal for military valor. After repatriation, in July 1939 he assumed command of the newly established 41st Land Bombardment Wing, based in Reggio Emilia. In September 1939 the 41st Wing was transferred to the Ponte Olivo Airfield in Sicily, and after Italy's entry into the Second World War it participated in the siege of Malta and in the North African campaign.

In April 1941 Pezzi left command of the 41st Wing and was transferred to the 9th Air Brigade "Leone", of which he assumed command in the following June. For his wartime activities he was awarded another Silver Medal for Military Valor, and in February 1942 he was promoted to Air Brigade General (equivalent to air commodore), thus becoming the youngest general of the Regia Aeronautica. He was then appointed commander of the air force component of the Italian Army in Russia, distinguishing himself in operations on the Eastern Front, for which he was awarded the Knight's Cross of the Military Order of Savoy and his fifth and last Silver Medal for Military Valor by the Italian authorities, as well as the Cross of Merit of the Order of the German Eagle 1st Class with Swords, the Iron Cross First Class and the Iron Cross Second Class.

On 29 December 1942, after the beginning of Operation Little Saturn, Pezzi was informed that about 12,000 soldiers, including two thousand wounded, had been surrounded by the Red Army in Chertkovo, and decided to personally fly there along with medical colonel Federico Bocchetti, in order to bring food and medicines and evacuate the most serious among the wounded. Pezzi and Bocchetti took off from Voroshilovgrad with a Savoia-Marchetti SM.81 and reached Chertkovo, delivering the supplies to the besieged garrison and loading several wounded before taking off again; however, the aircraft, its eight-man crew and the wounded never reached Voroshilovgrad, and were never seen again. General Pezzi was posthumously awarded the Gold Medal of Military Valor.
