= Cannone da 75/32 modello 37 =

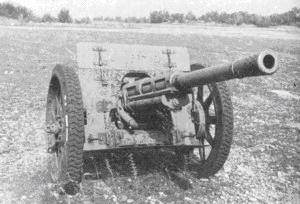
- Type: Field gun
- Place of origin: Italy

Service history
- Used by: Italy; Nazi Germany; Peru
- Wars: Second World War, Ecuadorian–Peruvian War

Production history
- Designer: Ansaldo
- No. built: 177 up to mid-1943 (unknown afterwards)

Specifications
- Mass: Travel: 1,250 kg (2,760 lb); Combat: 1,200 kg (2,600 lb)
- Barrel length: 2.574 m (8 ft 5.3 in) (with muzzle brake) L/32
- Shell: 75 x 334mmR
- Shell weight: 6.3 kg (14 lb)
- Caliber: 75 mm (3.0 in)
- Carriage: Split-trail
- Elevation: −10° to +45°
- Traverse: 50°
- Muzzle velocity: 624 m/s (2,050 ft/s)
- Maximum firing range: 12.5 km (13,700 yd)

The Cannone da 75/32 modello 37 was an Italian field gun used during World War II. The designation indicates that the gun had a 75 mm caliber, the barrel was 32 caliber-lengths long and it was accepted for service in 1937.

== History ==
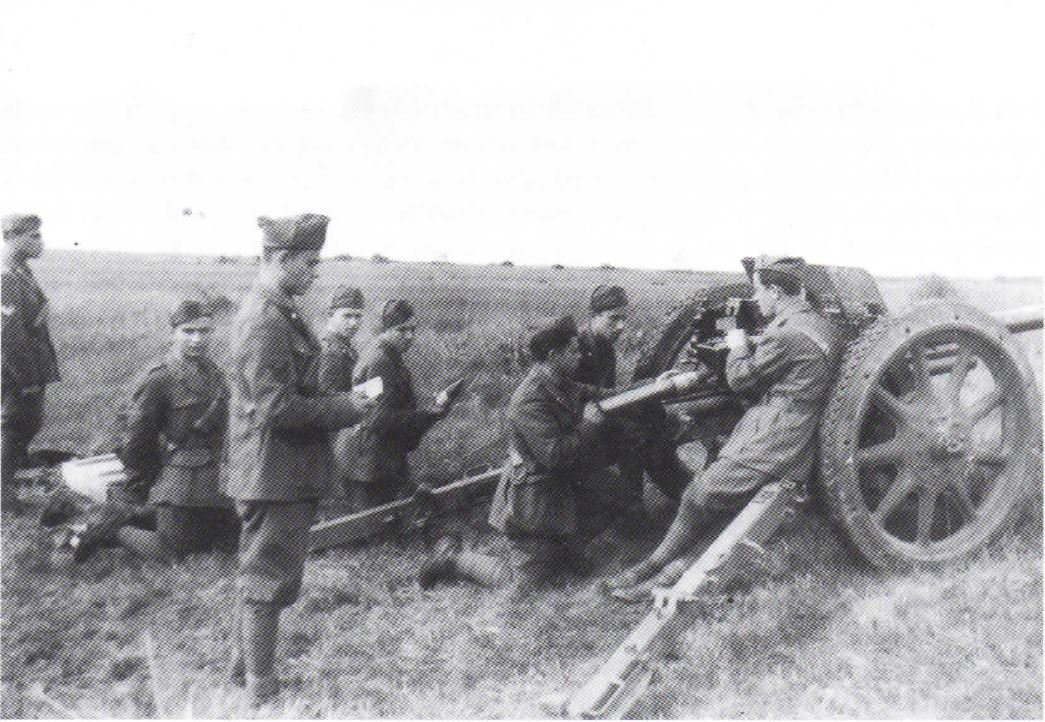
Cannone da 75/32 modello 37 on the Russian front.

The newly born 75/18 howitzers already presented major ballistic limitations, given that their maximum range was about 9 km, when the divisional artillery of the other European armies were not only of greater caliber, but also had significantly higher ranges, therefore the Arms and Ammunition Technical Service requested that a new elongated gun be studied to be mounted on the carriage of the 75/18 Mod 35 howitzer. The increase in the length of the gun, as well as the increase in range as artillery from campaign, was aimed at the use of the new piece in anti- tank function. The piece, designed to have as many parts as possible in common with the 75/18 howitzer, mounted a 34-gauge long barrel, was prepared at the Naples Arsenal and the prototype was presented in 1937 . This model, called 75/34 Mod. SF, was thus adopted by the Royal Army and production was assigned to Ansaldo. This intervened on the muzzle, shortening it and modifying the muzzle brake, thus obtaining the standard version 75/32 Mod. 1937.

The Cannone da 75/32 was designed by Ansaldo and the first examples were produced in 1937.

After Italy surrendered, guns captured by Germany were designated 7.5 cm FK248(i).

This gun was used in Russia with the ARMIR (ARMata Italiana in Russia - Italian Army in Russia) in the "201º Reggimento d'artiglieria motorizzato" and it had good results against the Soviet T-34 tank.

Some were acquired by the Peruvian Army before the Ecuadorian–Peruvian War of 1941.

== Technicalities ==
The barrel was one piece and in the prototype it was equipped with a muzzle brake. The rifling had a step of 20 calibers.

The mount, similar to that of the 75/18 Mod. 1934/1935, had metal spoked wheels, originally in Elektron, an alloy of Magnesium and Aluminium, then later it got replaced by sheet steel. The wheels had a diameter of 1,3 meters (3,28 ft) with a semi-pneumatic ring, and an elastic torsion bar suspension. The maximum towing velocity for this piece was 60 km/h (37,2 mph), superior to the one normally used for light artillery. The split-tails could fold in two elements, obtaining a length gear configuration that was quite limited.

The piece was able to fire both a shell on either one or two charges giving different muzzle velocities) and therefore different ranges. From 1943 onwards it was provided with a 12 mm thick shield and a faster loading system to allow an easier engagement with armored vehicles.

== Version ==
The base of the cannon 75/34 Mod. SF was used for the hard and self-propelled guns, in particular for the type of P 26/40.

== See also ==
- Italian Army equipment in World War II

=== Weapons of comparable role, performance and era ===
- German 5 cm Pak 38
- Russian 76mm ZiS-3
- British Ordnance QF 6-pounder
