= Alpini Battalion "Val Tagliamento" =

Inactive Italian Army mountain infantry unit

- Battaglione Alpini "Val Tagliamento"
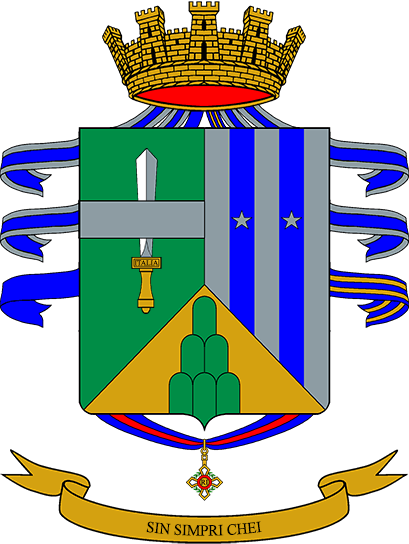
- Battalion coat of arms
- Active: 5 Oct. 1882 – 1 Nov. 1886; 10 Feb. 1915 – 15 Feb. 1918; 2 Sept. 1939 – 5 July 1943; 1 July 1963 – 26 Sept. 1992
- Country: Italy
- Branch: Italian Army
- Type: Mountain Infantry
- Part of: Alpine Brigade "Julia"
- Garrison/HQ: Tolmezzo
- Motto(s): "Sin simpri chei"
- Anniversaries: 23 April 1941
- Decorations: 1× Military Order of Italy; 4× Silver Medals of Military Valor; 1× Bronze Medal of Military Valor; 1× Bronze Medal of Army Valor

Insignia
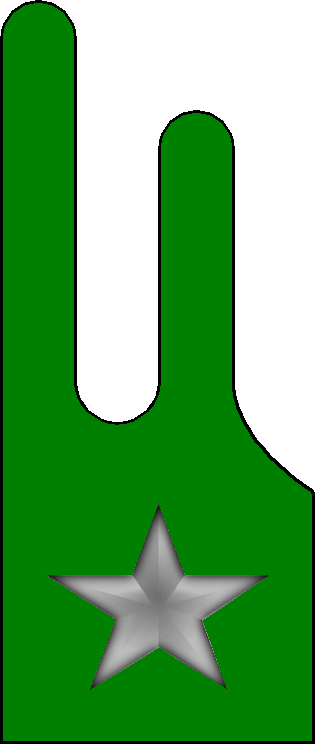
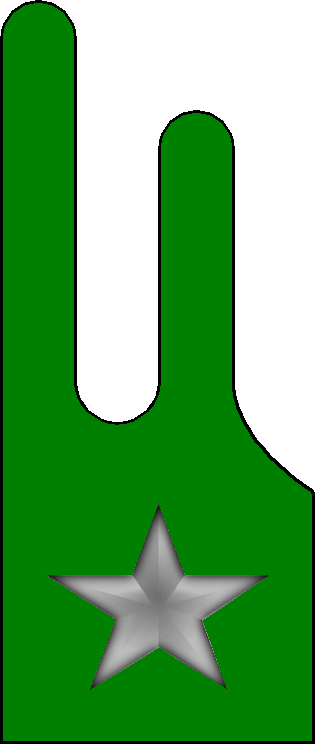
- Alpini gorget patches

The Alpini Battalion "Val Tagliamento" (Italian: Battaglione Alpini "Val Tagliamento") is an inactive mountain warfare battalion of the Italian Army based last in Tolmezzo in Friuli-Venezia Giulia. The battalion belongs to the Italian Army's Alpini infantry speciality and was assigned to the Alpine Brigade "Julia". In 1882, the Royal Italian Army formed the Battalion "Val Tagliamento", which four years later was renamed Alpini Battalion "Gemona". In 1915, the army formed a new Alpini Battalion "Val Tagliamento", which fought in World War I in the alpine areas of the Italian front. The battalion was disbanded in 1920. In September 1939, the "Val Tagliamento" battalion was reformed and in June 1940 the battalion participated in the Italian invasion of France. In November 1940, the battalion was sent to Albania, where the battalion was attached to the 3rd Alpine Division "Julia", which had suffered heavy losses in the Greco-Italian War. In June 1941, after the Invasion of Yugoslavia, the battalion was sent to Montenegro on occupation duty. In August 1942, the battalion returned to Italy. At the end of 1942, the "Val Tagliamento" battalion was sent to occupied France on garrison duty. In July 1943, the battalion returned to Italy and was disbanded.

In 1963, the battalion was reformed and assigned to the 11th Alpini Fortification Grouping. The battalion was tasked with manning Alpine Wall fortifications in the But valley and the Tagliamento valley near Tolmezzo. In 1964, the battalion received a company from the disbanded Alpini Battalion "Val Natisone" and in 1975 it received nine companies from the disbanded Alpini Battalion "Val Fella". In 1976, the battalion was assigned the flag of the 11th Alpini Fortification Grouping. In 1991, the battalion was reduced to two companies and in 1992 the battalion was disbanded.

The battalion's anniversary falls on 23 April 1941, the last day of the Greco-Italian War, during which the Alpini battalions "Val Fella" and "Val Tagliamento" earned a shared Silver Medal of Military Valor.

== History ==
On 5 October 1882, the Royal Italian Army's 6th Alpini Regiment formed the Battalion "Val Tagliamento" in Gemona. The battalion recruited in the Brenta valley in Veneto. On 1 November 1886, the Alpini battalions changed their names from their recruiting zones to the cities and towns, where their base was located. Consequently the Battalion "Val Tagliamento" was renamed Alpini Battalion "Gemona". On 1 August 1887, the "Gemona" battalion was transferred to the newly formed 7th Alpini Regiment, which in turn transferred the battalion on 1 October 1909 to the newly formed 8th Alpini Regiment.

=== World War I ===
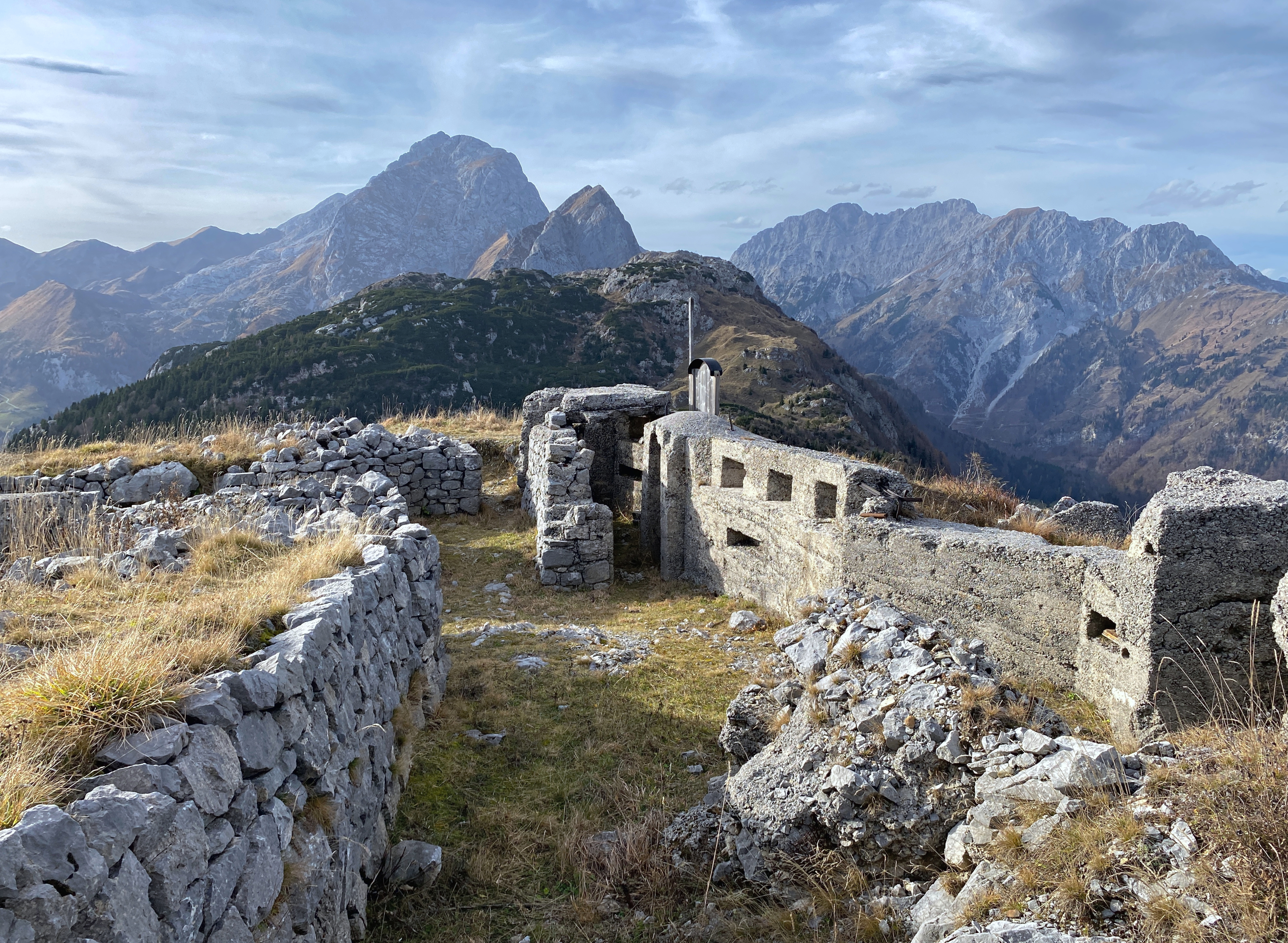
Italian World War I position on the summit of Freikofel, in the background the summit of Pal Piccolo

At the outbreak of World War I Italy declared its neutrality. In January 1915, the existing Alpini battalions began with the formation of a reserve battalion, with men, who had completed their military service at least four years, but not more than eleven years prior. These reserve battalions were named for a valley (Italian: Valle; abbreviated Val) located near their associated regular Alpini battalion's base, and the reserve battalions wore the same Nappina on their Cappello Alpino as their associated regular Alpini battalion. On 10 February 1915, the 8th Alpini Regiment's Alpini Battalion "Tolmezzo" formed the Alpini Battalion "Val Tagliamento", which initially consisted of the 212th and 272nd Alpini Company. On 1 November 1916, the 278th Alpini Company joined the battalion.

On 23 May 1915, Italy declared war on Austro-Hungary and the next day the battalions "Tolmezzo" and "Val Tagliamento" occupied took and held the summits of Pal Piccolo, Freikofel and Pal Grande. As the mountainous terrain of the Italian front made the deployment of entire Alpini regiments impracticable the Alpini battalions were employed either independently or assigned to groups, groupings, or infantry divisions as needed. In 1916, the "Val Tagliamento" battalion was deployed initially on Pal Piccolo. In September 1916, the battalion was sent to the Lagorai range, where it was tasked to take the summit of Cima Busa Alta. Between 8 and 10 October 1916 the battalion attacked, together with the Alpini Battalion "Cividale", the Austrian positions below the summit, some of which the battalions managed to conquer. Afterwards the battalion was deployed on the Monte Cauriol.

In November and December 1917, after the disastrous Battle of Caporetto, the Royal Italian Army was forced to retreat to new lines along the Piave river and in the Monte Grappa massif, where the Austro-Hungarian was then stopped in the First Battle of the Piave River and First Battle of Monte Grappa. On the Monte Grappa the 8th Alpini Regiment's battalions "Val Tagliamento", "Val Natisone", and "Monte Matajur" suffered heavy casualties in November and December 1917: the "Val Tagliamento" suffered 1,055 among killed, wounded, and missing, while the "Val Natisone" suffered 736 casualties, and the "Monte Matajur" 702 casualties. As the regiment's recruiting areas in Friuli had been occupied by Austro-Hungarian forces after the Battle of Caporetto, the three battalions were disbanded on 15 February 1918.

After the war, the Alpini battalions "Tolmezzo" and "Val Tagliamento" were awarded a shared Silver Medal of Military Valor for having taken and held the summits of Pal Piccolo, Freikofel and Pal Grande on 24 May – 4 July 1915, and for the "Val Tagliamento" to have taken Austrian positions on the Cima Busa Alta in the Lagorai range on 8–10 October 1916. The Silver Medal of Military Valor was affixed to the flag of the 8th Alpini Regiment added to the regiment's coat of arms.

=== Interwar years ===
On 31 October 1935, the III Superior Alpine Command "Julio" was reorganized as 3rd Alpine Division "Julia", which included the 7th Alpini Regiment, 8th Alpini Regiment, 9th Alpini Regiment, and 3rd Alpine Artillery Regiment "Julia". On 31 December 1935, the 7th Alpini Regiment was transferred to the newly formed 5th Alpine Division "Pusteria".

On 7 April 1939, Italy invaded Albania and by the middle of April the 3rd Alpine Division "Julia" moved to Northern Albania, where its regiments garrisoned the border with the Kingdom of Yugoslavia.

=== World War II ===
On 2 September 1939, one day after the German Invasion of Poland had begun, the depots of the 8th Alpini Regiment in Italy reformed the Alpini battalions "Val Fella", "Val Tagliamento", and "Val Natisone". The three battalions were assigned to the 1st Alpini Group, with which they participated in June 1940 in the Italian invasion of France.

In September 1940, the 3rd Alpine Division "Julia" moved from Northern to Southern Albania and took up positions along the border with the Kingdom of Greece for the upcoming Italian invasion of Greece. On 28 October 1940, Italian forces invaded Greece and the 3rd Alpine Division "Julia" engaged Greek forces in the Battle of Pindus, during which the "Julia" division suffered heavy casualties. In early November the Alpini battalions "Val Fella", "Val Tagliamento", and "Val Natisone" were sent to Albania, where the battalions "Val Fella" and "Val Tagliamento" reinforced the "Julia" division, while the battalion "Val Natisone" was attached to the XXV Army Corps. On 10 November, the "Julia" division was taken out of the line, but only four days later it had to return to the front in the Berat sector, where it came under heavy Greek attacks until 8 December. On 23 December 1940, the "Julia" division was again attacked by the Greeks; the attack lasted until 31 December and forced the division to retreat to the Mali i Qarrishtës ridge in extreme weather conditions. On 8 January 1941, a Greek offensive in the Berat sector hit the "Julia" division hard and the following day the division fell back once more. On 21 January 1941, the division was down to a single regiment with three understrength battalions. The remains of the "Julia" were withdrawn and transferred to Mavrovo, near Vlorë, where the division was reformed and received the Alpini Battalion "Susa" from the 3rd Alpini Regiment as reinforcement.

At the end of February the division, now 10,500 men strong, was sent again to the first line; on 24 February it was deployed on Mali i Golikut and along the Zagoria Valley. On 28 February a new battle was fought in the Tepelenë sector; the "Julia" division, as the last Italian unit defending the town, was attacked by the 2nd Greek Division, but managed to hold the front while suffering heavy casualties. On 7 March the Greeks attacked on Mali i Golikut, and two days later they renewed their attack, causing heavy losses; by 11 March the Greek offensive ended without taking Tepelenë, and both the "Julia" division and the two Greek divisions involved in the attack (the 2nd and the 17th) were worn out by the heavy fighting and losses.

In April 1941, following the German invasion and Axis occupation of Greece, the division was transferred to the Corinth Canal area and occupied the Peloponnese, while the three Valle battalions moved to the barracks of the "Julia" division in Shkodër in Northern Albania. For their service and sacrifice on the Greek between 14 November 1940 and 23 April 1941 the Alpini battalions "Val Fella" and "Val Tagliamento" were awarded a shared Silver Medal of Military Valor. Similarly the Alpini Battalion "Val Natisone" was awarded a Silver Medal of Military Valor for its service on the Greek Front. The medals were affixed to the 8th Alpini Regiment's flag and added to the regiment's coat of arms.

In June 1941, the 1st Alpini Group with the Alpini battalions "Val Fella", "Val Tagliamento", and "Val Natisone", was sent to occupied Montenegro on garrison duty. The Alpini group was attached to the 5th Alpine Division "Pusteria" and heavily engaged by Yugoslav partisans. In August 1942, the Alpini Group returned to Italy. On 10 November 1942, Axis forces occupied Vichy France and by the end of the same year the Alpini group was attached to the 6th Alpine Division "Alpi Graie", with which it was sent to occupied France on garrison duty.

On 5 July 1943, the Alpini battalions "Val Fella", "Val Tagliamento", and "Val Natisone" returned from occupied France and were disbanded, with their personnel assigned to the 8th Alpini Regiment to help reform the regiment's regular Alpini battalions. The 8th Alpini Regiment, which had been nearly destroyed during its deployment to the Eastern Front, was still in the process of rebuilding its battalions, when the Armistice of Cassibile was announced on 8 September 1943. Five days later, on 13 September 1943, the regiment and its battalions were disbanded by invading German forces.

=== Cold War ===
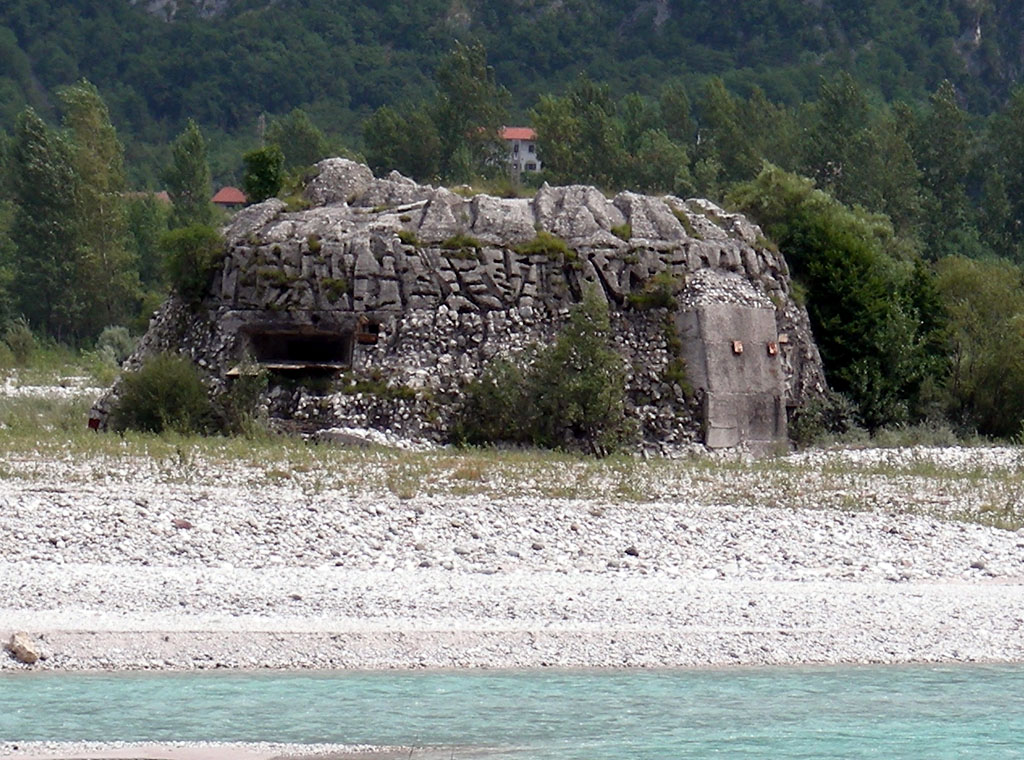
Alpine wall bunker near Venzone on the banks of the Tagliamento river

On 21 February 1952, the Italian Army formed the XI Position Battalion in Tolmezzo. On 1 September of the same year the battalion was redesignated as 11th Frontier Grouping. The grouping consisted of the I, III, and IV barrier groups, which manned the fortifications and bunkers of the Alpine Wall blocking passage through the valleys of the Carnic Alps and the Italian part of the Julian Alps. In 1954, the 11th Frontier Grouping and the 12th Frontier Grouping, which was tasked with the manning of the fortifications and barriers in Cadore, joined the Alpine Brigade "Julia". On 26 April 1954, the 12th Frontier Grouping was disbanded and on 1 July of the same year, the 11th Frontier Grouping formed a fourth barrier group to replace the disbanded grouping.

On 1 January 1957, the 11th Frontier Grouping was renamed 11th Alpini Position Grouping and the following 7 April the grouping received its flag. On 1 September of the same year, the grouping's four barrier groups were renumbered as I, III, IV, and V Alpini position battalions. On 1 January 1958, the grouping formed the XIII Alpini Position Battalion, and the existing battalions were renumbered as XII, XIV, XV, and XVI Alpini position battalions.

On 31 December 1962, the commands of the XIV and XVI Alpini position battalions were disbanded and their companies assigned to other units of the grouping. The next day, on 1 January 1963, the 11th Alpini Position Grouping was renamed 11th Alpini Fortification Grouping. On 1 July 1963, the XII Alpini Position Battalion was renamed Alpini Battalion "Val Fella", the XIII Alpini Position Battalion was renamed Alpini Battalion "Val Natisone", and the XV Alpini Position Battalion was renamed Alpini Battalion "Val Tagliamento". The Alpini Battalion "Val Fella" was based in Pontebba and tasked with maintaining and, in case of war, manning the Alpine wall positions in the Val Canale between Pontebba and the Austrian border, as well as the fortifications in the side valleys of the Val Canale. The Alpini Battalion "Val Natisone" was based in Carnia and tasked with maintaining and, in case of war, manning the Alpine wall positions, which blocked the roads from Yugoslavia over the Sella Somdogna, Sella Nevea, and Sella Carnizza passes to the East of the Fella valley, as well the barrier at Campiolo at the end of the Fella valley. The Alpini Battalion "Val Tagliamento" was based in Tolmezzo and tasked with maintaining and, in case of war, manning the Alpine wall positions on the Plöcken Pass, as well as the fortifications blocking passage through the But valley and through the Tagliamento valley below Tolmezzo. On 21 May 1964, the Alpini Battalion "Val Natisone" was reduced to a reserve. On 30 June of the same year, the Alpini Battalion "Val Natisone" was disbanded and three of its companies transferred to the Alpini Battalion "Val Fella", while the 216th Alpini Company in Campiolo joined the Alpini Battalion "Val Tagliamento".

During the 1975 army reform the army disbanded the regimental level and newly independent battalions were granted for the first time their own flags. On 31 January 1975, the command of the 11th Alpini Fortification Grouping and the command of the Alpini Battalion "Val Fella" were reduced to reserve unit. The next day the companies of the "Val Fella" battalion joined the Alpini Battalion "Val Tagliamento". On 1 June of the same year the 11th Alpini Fortification Grouping and Alpini Battalion "Val Fella" were disbanded.

On 12 November 1976, the President of the Italian Republic Giovanni Leone assigned with decree 846 the flag and traditions of the 11th Alpini Fortification Grouping to the Alpini Battalion "Val Tagliamento". At the same time the medals and military honors awarded to the "Val Fella", "Val Tagliamento", and "Val Natisone" battalions were transferred to the "Val Tagliamento" battalion's flag. Consequently, the "Val Tagliamento" battalion's flag was decorated with one Military Order of Italy, the Silver Medal of Military Valor awarded to the "Val Tagliamento" battalion for its conduct in World War I, the Silver Medal of Military Valor awarded to the "Val Fella" battalion for its conduct in World War I, the shared Silver Medal of Military Valor awarded to the "Val Fella" and "Val Tagliamento" battalions for their conduct in the Greco-Italian War, the Silver Medal of Military Valor awarded to the "Val Natisone" battalion for its conduct in the Greco-Italian War, and the Bronze Medal of Military Valor awarded to the "Val Natisone" battalion for its conduct in World War I. The six awards were also added to the battalion's newly created coat of arms. The Alpini Battalion "Val Tagliamento" consisted now of 17 companies, twelve of which were reserve companies and the following five were active units:

- Alpini Battalion "Val Tagliamento", in Tolmezzo
  - Command and Services Company, in Tolmezzo
  - 212th Alpini Company, in Paluzza
  - 216th Maintenance and Surveillance Company, in Tolmezzo
  - 269th Alpini Company, in Ugovizza
  - 308th Maintenance and Surveillance Company, in Pontebba

For its conduct and work after the 1976 Friuli earthquake the Alpini Battalion "Tolmezzo" was awarded a Bronze Medal of Army Valor, which was affixed to the battalion's flag and added to the battalion's coat of arms. On 1 January 1980, the Alpini Battalion "Val Tagliamento" was renamed Alpini Fortification Battalion "Val Tagliamento".

=== Recent times ===
After the end of the Cold War the Italian Army began to draw down its forces and on 13 February 1991, the 212th Alpini Company was disbanded. On 15 June of the same year, the 269th Alpini Company and 308th Maintenance and Surveillance Company were disbanded, and on 16 November the 216th Maintenance and Surveillance Company was renamed 216th Building Maintenance Company. The company then began the process to remove weapons and equipment from the bunkers and fortifications. On 26 September 1992, the Alpini Fortification Battalion "Val Tagliamento" was disbanded and on 30 September the flag of the 11th Alpini Fortification Grouping was transferred to the Shrine of the Flags in the Vittoriano in Rome.

In 2001, the Italian Army split the support weapons companies of its infantry regiments into a mortar company and an anti-tank company. The anti-tank companies of the Alpini regiments were named for Valle battalions and consequently the following anti-tank companies were formed:

- 212th Anti-tank Company "Val Tagliamento", for the 14th Alpini Regiment
- 216th Anti-tank Company "Val Natisone", for the 8th Alpini Regiment
- 269th Anti-tank Company "Val Fella", for the 7th Alpini Regiment

On 14 October 2005, the 212th Anti-tank Company "Val Tagliamento" was disbanded, followed by the 216th Anti-tank Company "Val Natisone" and 269th Anti-tank Company "Val Fella" in 2011.

== Fortifications ==
After 1 June 1975, the Alpini Battalion "Val Tagliamento" was responsible for all Alpine Wall fortifications and barriers in the valleys of the Carnic Alps and the Italian part of the Julian Alps. The fortifications were divided into three readiness categories designated Type A, Type B, and Type C:

- Type A = fortification fully equipped and provisioned, with its personnel and close support platoon onsite
- Type B = fortification fully equipped and provisioned, with its personnel onsite, while the close support platoon was a reserve unit
- Type C = fortification fully equipped, but not provisioned, with its personnel and close support platoon both being reserve units

The following lists all the barriers grouped by their original Alpini battalions:

- Alpini Battalion "Val Fella", in Pontebba
  - Barrier: Ugovizza, Type B — 269th Alpini Company
  - Barrier: Malborghetto, Type C — 270th Alpini Company
  - Barrier: Val d'Uque, Type C — 271st Alpini Company
  - Barrier: Tratte, Type C — 273rd Alpini Company
  - Barrier: Case Marco, Type C — 312th Alpini Company
  - Barrier: Cereschiatis, Type c — 313th Alpini Company
- Alpini Battalion "Val Tagliamento", in Tolmezzo
  - Barrier: Plöcken Pass, Type A — 212th Alpini Company
  - Barrier: Torre Moscarda, Type C — 272nd Alpini Company
  - Barrier: Stua di Ramaz, Type C — 278th Alpini Company
  - Barrier: Portis, Type C — 319th Alpini Company (renumbered 220th Alpini Company in 1975)
  - Barrier: Cavazzo, Type C — 321st Alpini Company (renumbered 288th Alpini Company in 1975)
  - Barrier: Ponte del Cristo, Type C — 322nd Alpini Company (renumbered 314th Alpini Company in 1975)
- Alpini Battalion "Val Natisone", in Carnia
  - Barrier: Campiolo, Type B — 216th Alpini Company
  - Barrier: Sella Somdogna, Type C — 220th Alpini Company (renumbered 306th Alpini Company in 1975)
  - Barrier: Sella Nevea, Type C — 275th Alpini Company (renumbered 307th Alpini Company in 1975)
  - Barrier: Sella Carnizza, Type C — 288th Alpini Company (renumbered 308th Alpini Company in 1975)
