= 14th Alpini Regiment =

Active Italian Army mountain infantry unit

- 14° Reggimento Alpini
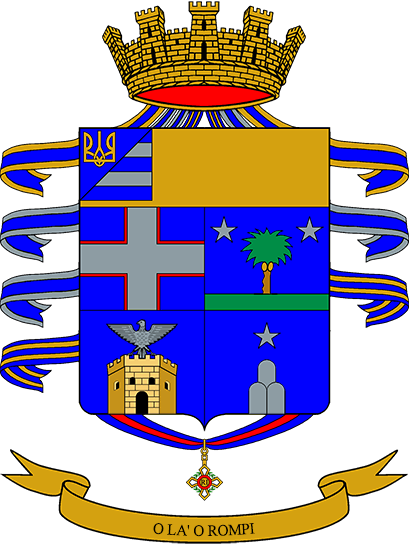
- Regimental coat of arms
- Active: 1 Oct. 1975 – 14 Oct. 2005; 1 Oct. 2022 – today
- Country: Italy
- Branch: Italian Army
- Type: Mountain Infantry
- Part of: Alpine Brigade "Julia"
- Garrison/HQ: Udine
- Motto: "O là o rompi"
- Anniversaries: 24 May 1915
- Decorations: 1× Military Order of Italy; 2× Gold Medals of Military Valor; 3× Silver Medals of Military Valor; 2× Silver Medals of Army Valor; 1× Silver Cross of Army Merit

Insignia
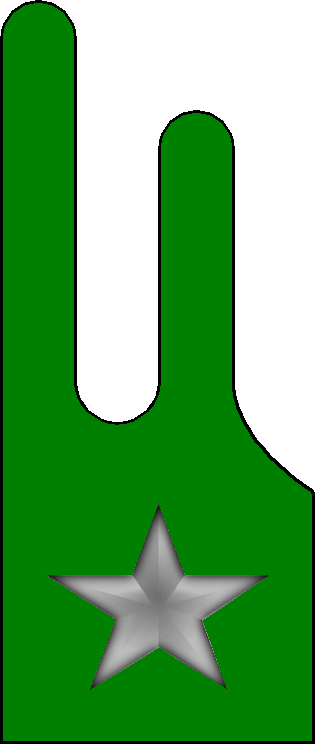
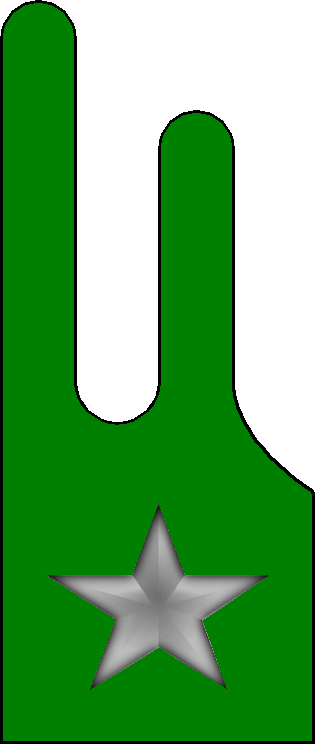
- Alpini gorget patches

The 14th Alpini Regiment (Italian: 14° Reggimento Alpini) in a mountain warfare unit of the Italian Army based in Udine in Friuli-Venezia Giulia. The regiment belongs to the Italian Army's Alpini infantry speciality. The regiment was formed in 1993 and consisted of the Alpini Battalion "Tolmezzo", whose flag and traditions it inherited. The regiment was disbanded in 2005. On 1 October 2022, the flag and traditions of the 14th Alpini Regiment were assigned to the Command and Tactical Supports Unit "Julia" of the Alpine Brigade "Julia", which on the same day was renamed 14th Alpini Command and Tactical Supports Unit.

In 1908, the 7th Alpini Regiment formed the Alpini Battalion "Tolmezzo" in Tolmezzo. In 1909, the battalion was transferred to the newly formed 8th Alpini Regiment. In 1911, the battalion deployed to Libya for the Italo-Turkish War. For its conduct in the war the "Tolmezzo" battalion, was awarded two Silver Medals of Military Valor. During World War I the battalion fought in the alpine areas of the Italian front, and earned its third Silver Medal of Military Valor. In World War II the battalion fought in the Greco-Italian War and on the Eastern Front, where the battalion was almost completely destroyed during the Red Army's Operation Little Saturn in winter 1942–43. On 8 September 1943, the Armistice of Cassibile was announced and five days later, on 13 September 1943, invading German forces disbanded the 8th Alpini Regiment and its battalions.

The battalion was reformed in 1946 and assigned to the 8th Alpini Regiment. In 1975 the 8th Alpini Regiment was disbanded and the "Tolmezzo" battalion became an autonomous unit, which in 1976 was granted its own flag. The battalion was assigned to the Alpine Brigade "Julia". In 1993, the battalion entered the newly created 14th Alpini Regiment. The regiment was disbanded in 2005 and at the same time the 8th Alpini Regiment's Alpini Battalion "Gemona" was renamed Alpini Battalion "Tolmezzo". The regiment's anniversary falls on 24 May 1915, the first day of the war on the Italian front, on which the 8th Alpini Regiment's battalions "Tolmezzo" and "Val Tagliamento" earned a shared Silver Medal of Military Valor for having taken and held the summits of Pal Piccolo, Freikofel and Pal Grande.

== History ==
On 9 January 1908, the Royal Italian Army's 7th Alpini Regiment formed the Alpini Battalion "Tolmezzo" in the city of Tolmezzo. The new battalion consisted of the 6th, 12th, and 72nd Alpini companies, which had been ceded by the Alpini Battalion "Ceva" of the 1st Alpini Regiment, the Alpini Battalion "Borgo San Dalmazzo" of the 2nd Alpini Regiment, respectively the Alpini Battalion "Gemona" of the 7th Alpini Regiment. On 1 October 1909, the 7th Alpini Regiment transferred the Alpini battalions "Gemona" and "Tolmezzo" to the newly formed 8th Alpini Regiment.

Since 1886 Alpini soldiers and non-commissioned officers were issued thread tufts, called Nappina in Italian, which were clipped to the Cappello Alpino headdress, and colored white for the troops of a regiment's first battalion, red for the troops of a regiment's second battalion, green for the troops of a regiment's third battalion, and blue for the troops of a regiment's fourth battalion. As second battalion of the 8th Alpini Regiment, the "Tolmezzo" battalion received a red Nappina.

=== Italo-Turkish War ===
On 29 September 1911 the Kingdom of Italy declared war against the Ottoman Empire and the regimental command of the 8th Alpini Regiment and the Alpini Battalion "Tolmezzo" were deployed to Libya for the Italo-Turkish War. In October 1912 the regimental command was used to form the 8th Special Regiment, which on 23 March 1913 fought in the Battle of Assaba and on 18 June 1913 in the Battle of Ettangi. For its conduct in the Battle of Assaba and its conduct in the Battle of Ettangi the Alpini Battalion "Tolmezzo", was awarded two Silver Medals of Military Valor, which were affixed to the flag of the 8th Alpini Regiment and added to the regiment's coat of arms.

=== World War I ===
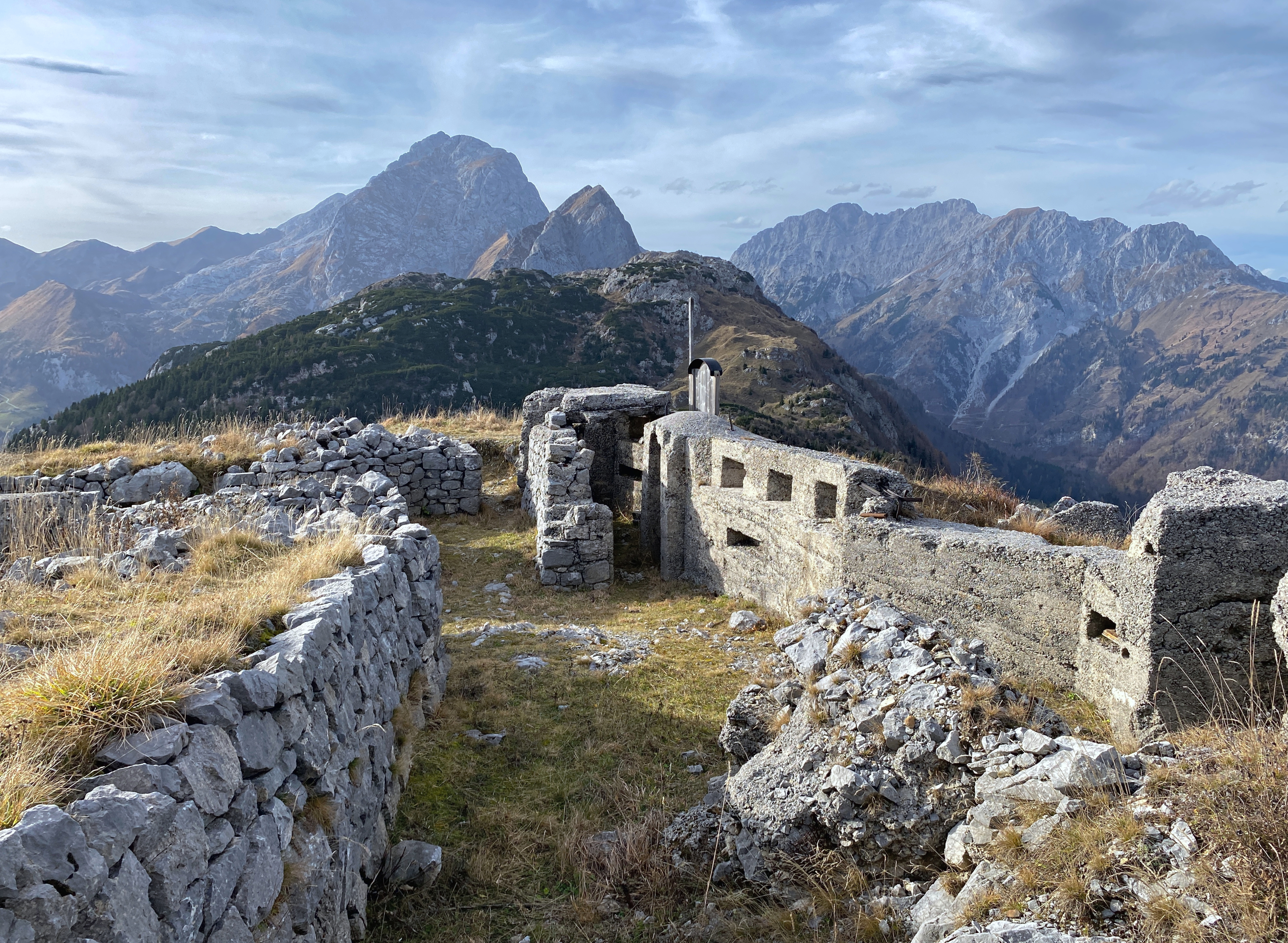
Italian World War I position on the summit of Freikofel, in the background the summit of Pal Piccolo

At the outbreak of World War I Italy declared its neutrality. In the autumn of 1914 the eight Alpini regiments formed 38 additional Alpini companies with men, who had completed their military service in the preceding four years. These companies were numbered from 80th to 117th and assigned to the existing Alpini battalions. The "Tolmezzo" battalion formed the 109th Alpini Company, and then consisted of four companies. In January 1915, each Alpini battalion began with the formation of a reserve battalion, with men, who had completed their military service at least four years, but not more than eleven years prior. These reserve battalions were named for a valley (Italian: Valle; abbreviated Val) located near their associated regular Alpini battalion's base, and the reserve battalions received the same Nappina as their associated regular Alpini battalion. The "Tolmezzo" battalion formed the Alpini Battalion "Val Tagliamento", which consisted of the 212th, 272nd, and 278th Alpini Company.

On 23 May 1915, Italy declared war on Austro-Hungary and the next day the battalions "Tolmezzo" and "Val Tagliamento" occupied took and held the summits of Pal Piccolo, Freikofel and Pal Grande. As the mountainous terrain of the Italian front made the deployment of entire Alpini regiments impracticable the Alpini battalions were employed either independently or assigned to groups, groupings, or infantry divisions as needed. By the end of 1915 the Alpini regiments began to form additional companies with recruits born in 1896. These new companies were numbered from 118th to 157th and were used, together with the 38 companies formed earlier, to form an additional reserve battalion for each regular battalion. These new battalions were named for a mountain (Italian: Monte) located near their associated regular Alpini battalion's base, and the reserve battalions received the same Nappina as their associated regular Alpini battalion. In December 1915, the Alpini Battalion "Tolmezzo" ceded the 109th Alpini Company to the newly formed Alpini Battalion "Monte Arvènis", which also included the 152nd and 153rd Alpini Company.

In 1916, the Alpini Battalion "Tolmezzo" was deployed in the area of the But Valley. In 1917, after the disastrous Battle of Caporetto and the following Italian retreat to the Piave river, the "Tolmezzo" battalion fought in the First Battle of Monte Grappa on Col della Berretta and Col Caprile in the Monte Grappa massif. In 1918, the battalion was in the area of the Tonale.

After the war the Alpini battalions "Tolmezzo" and "Val Tagliamento" were awarded a shared Silver Medal of Military Valor for having taken and held the summits of Pal Piccolo, Freikofel and Pal Grande on 24 May – 4 July 1915, and for the "Val Tagliamento" to have taken Austrian positions on the Cima Busa Alta in the Lagorai range on 8–10 October 1916. The medal was affixed to the flag of the 8th Alpini Regiment and added to the regiment's coat of arms.

=== Interwar years ===
On 27 October 1934, the III Alpine Brigade was renamed III Superior Alpine Command. In December of the same year the command was given the name "Julio". On 31 October 1935, the III Superior Alpine Command "Julio" was reorganized as 3rd Alpine Division "Julia", which included the 7th Alpini Regiment, 8th Alpini Regiment, 9th Alpini Regiment, and 3rd Alpine Artillery Regiment "Julia".

On 7 April 1939, Italy invaded Albania and by the middle of April the 3rd Alpine Division "Julia" moved to Northern Albania, where its regiments garrisoned the border with the Kingdom of Yugoslavia.

=== World War II ===
==== Greco-Italian War ====
On 10 June 1940, Italy entered World War II and the Alpini Battalion "Tolmezzo" consisted of a command company, and the 6th, 12th, and 72nd Alpini companies. In September 1940, the 3rd Alpine Division "Julia" moved from Northern to Southern Albania and took up positions along the border with the Kingdom of Greece for the upcoming Italian invasion of Greece. On 28 October 1940, Italian forces invaded Greece and the 3rd Alpine Division "Julia" engaged Greek forces in the Battle of Pindus, during which the "Julia" division suffered heavy casualties. On 10 November, the "Julia" division was taken out of the line, but only four days later it had to return to the front in the Berat sector, where it came under heavy Greek attacks until 8 December. On 23 December 1940, the "Julia" division was again attacked by the Greeks; the attack lasted until 31 December and forced the division to retreat to the Mali i Qarrishtës ridge in extreme weather conditions. On 8 January 1941, a Greek offensive in the Berat sector hit the "Julia" division hard and the following day the division fell back once more. On 21 January 1941, the division was down to a single regiment with three understrength battalions. The remains of the "Julia" were withdrawn and transferred to Mavrovo, near Vlorë.

At the end of February the division, now 10,500 men strong, was sent again to the first line; on 24 February it was deployed on Mali i Golikut and along the Zagoria Valley. On 28 February a new battle was fought in the Tepelenë sector; the "Julia" division, as the last Italian unit defending the town, was attacked by the 2nd Greek Division, but managed to hold the front while suffering heavy casualties. On 7 March the Greeks attacked on Mali i Golikut, and two days later they renewed their attack, causing heavy losses; by 11 March the Greek offensive ended without taking Tepelenë, and both the "Julia" division and the two Greek divisions involved in the attack (the 2nd and the 17th) were worn out by the heavy fighting and losses.

In April 1941, following the German invasion and Axis occupation of Greece, the division was transferred to the Corinth Canal area and occupied the Peloponnese. During the Greco-Italian War the division had suffered overall 9,317 casualties: 49 officers and 1,625 soldiers during October–November 1940, 153 officers and 3,644 soldiers between December 1940 and January 1941, and 116 officers and 3,730 soldiers between February and April 1941. For its service and sacrifice on the Greek front between 28 October 1940 and 23 April 1941 the 8th Alpini Regiment was awarded a Gold Medal of Military Valor, which was affixed to the 8th Alpini Regiment's flag and added to the regiment's coat of arms.

On 15 February 1942, the 8th Alpini Regiment formed a support weapons company for each of its three battalions and the Alpini Battalion "Tolmezzo" received the 114th Support Weapons Company. These companies were equipped with Breda M37 machine guns, and 45mm Mod. 35 and 81mm Mod. 35 mortars.

==== Eastern Front ====
On 2 March 1942, the 3rd Alpine Division "Julia" was assigned, together with the 2nd Alpine Division "Tridentina" and 4th Alpine Division "Cuneense", to the Alpine Army Corps. The corps was assigned to the Italian 8th Army, which was readied to be deployed in summer 1942 to the Eastern Front.

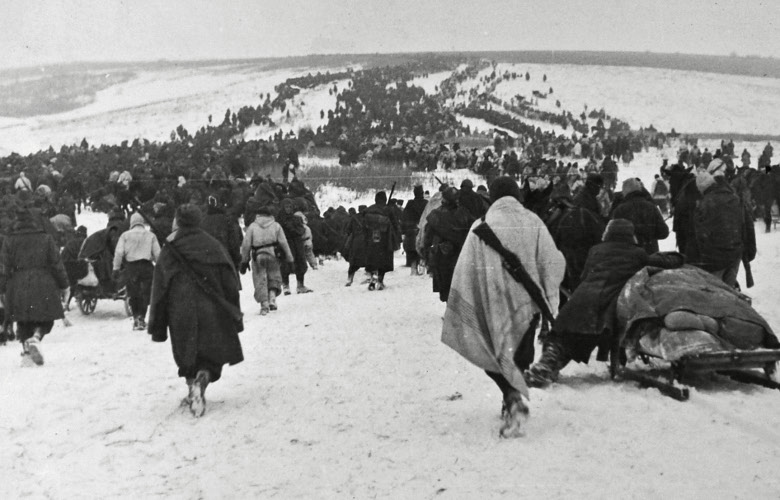
The Alpine Army Corps' retreat in Ukraine in January 1943

In July 1942 the three alpine division arrived in Eastern Ukraine, from where they marched eastwards towards the Don river. The Italian 8th Army covered the left flank of the German 6th Army, which spearheaded the German summer offensive of 1942 towards Stalingrad. On 12 December 1942, the Red Army commenced Operation Little Saturn, which, in its first stage, attacked and encircled the Italian II Army Corps and XXXV Army Corps, to the southeast of the Alpine Army Corps. On 13 January 1943, the Red Army launched the second stage of Operation Little Saturn with the Voronezh Front encircling and destroying the Hungarian Second Army to the northwest of the Alpine Army Corps.

On the evening of 17 January 1943, the Alpine Army Corps commander, General Gabriele Nasci, ordered a full retreat. At this point only the 2nd Alpine Division "Tridentina" was still capable of conducting combat operations. The 40,000-strong mass of stragglers — Alpini and Italians from other commands, plus German and Hungarians — followed the "Tridentina", which led the way westwards to the new Axis lines. As the Soviets had already occupied every village, bitter battles had to be fought to clear the way. On the morning of 26 January 1943, the spearheads of the "Tridentina" reached the hamlet of Nikolayevka, occupied by the Soviet 48th Guards Rifle Division. The Soviets had fortified the railway embankment on both sides of the village. General Nasci ordered a frontal assault and by nightfall the troops of the "Tridentina" division had managed to break through the Soviet lines. The Italian troops continued their retreat, which was no longer contested by Soviet forces. On 1 February 1943 the remnants of the Alpine Army Corps reached Axis lines. For its bravery and sacrifice in the Soviet Union the 8th Alpini Regiment was awarded a Gold Medal of Military Valor, which was affixed to the regiment's flag and added to the regiment's coat of arms.

In early 1943, the regiment's depots in Italy formed the Alpini battalions "Gemona bis", "Tolmezzo bis", and "Cividale bis", which were deployed to the Isonzo valley to fight Yugoslav partisans. The three battalion were disbanded in June 1943 and their personnel assigned to the 8th Alpini Regiment. The 8th Alpini Regiment was still in the process of being rebuilt, when the Armistice of Cassibile was announced on 8 September 1943. Five days later, on 13 September 1943, the regiment and its battalions was disbanded by invading German forces.

=== Cold War ===
On 1 April 1946, the Alpini Battalion "Tolmezzo" was reformed by renaming the 517th Guards Battalion, which had served with the Italian Co-belligerent Army. The battalion was assigned to the 8th Alpini Regiment, which on 15 October 1949 was assigned to the newly formed Alpine Brigade "Julia". The battalion was based in Tolmezzo, while the battalion's 12th Alpini Company was based in Tarcento. In March 1963, the battalion moved from Tolmezzo to Venzone, while the 12th Alpini Company moved from Tarcento to Moggio Udinese. Afterwards the "Tolmezzo" battalion consisted of the following units:

- Alpini Battalion "Tolmezzo", in Venzone
  - Command and Services Company
  - 6th, 12th, and 72nd Alpini Company (12th Alpini Company based in Moggio Udinese)
  - 114th Mortar Company, with 81mm M29 mortars

During the 1975 army reform the army disbanded the regimental level and newly independent battalions were granted for the first time their own flags. On 30 September 1975, the 8th Alpini Regiment was disbanded and the next day its battalions became autonomous units and were assigned to the Alpine Brigade "Julia". The Alpini Battalion "Tolmezzo" was based in Venzone and consisted of a command, a command and services company, three Alpini companies, and a heavy mortar company with eight 120mm Mod. 63 mortars. The battalion fielded now 950 men (45 officers, 96 non-commissioned officers, and 809 soldiers).

On 12 November 1976 the President of the Italian Republic Giovanni Leone granted the Alpini Battalion "Tolmezzo" a new flag. At the same time the medals and military honors awarded to the "Tolmezzo" battalion were transferred from the flag of the 8th Alpini Regiment to the battalion's flag, while the medals and military honors awarded to the entire regiment were duplicated for the flag of the battalion. Consequently, the "Tolmezzo" battalion's flag was decorated with one Military Order of Italy, two Gold Medals of Military Valor, and three Silver Medals of Military Valor. The awards were also added to the battalion's newly created coat of arms.

For its conduct and work after the 1976 Friuli earthquake the Alpini Battalion "Tolmezzo" was awarded a Silver Medal of Army Valor, which was affixed to the battalion's flag and added to the battalion's coat of arms. The battalion's 12th Alpini Company in Moggio Udinese was hit hard by the earthquake and suffered severe casualties, nonetheless the company immediately commenced rescue efforts in Moggio Udinese. For its commitment to save lives the 12th Alpini Company was awarded a separate Silver Medal of Army Valor. Both medals were affixed to the "Tolmezzo" battalion's flag and added to the battalion's coat of arms.

As the battalion's bases in Venzone and Moggio Udinese had been destroyed by the earthquake, the "Tolmezzo" battalion moved to Paluzza, while the 6th Alpini Company moved to Forni Avoltri and the 12th Alpini Company to Tolmezzo. On 22 December 1987, the entire battalion moved into the newly built base in Venzone.

=== Recent times ===
On 4 February 1993, the Alpini Battalion "Tolmezzo" lost its autonomy and the next day the battalion entered the newly formed 14th Alpini Regiment. During the same year the "Julia" brigade's Anti-Tank Company was disbanded and its personnel, with their TOW anti-tank guided missiles, assigned to the mortar companies of the brigade's battalions. Consequently, the 14th Alpini Regiment's 114th Mortar Company was renamed 114th Support Weapons Company. Between November 1993 and February 1994 the 14th Alpini Regiment served with the United Nations Operation in Mozambique. For its service in Mozambique the regiment was awarded a Silver Cross of Army Merit, which was affixed to the regiment's flag.

In 2001 the regiment's 114th Support Weapons Company was split into the 114th Mortar Company and the 212th Anti-tank Company "Val Tagliamento". On 14 October 2005, the command of the 14th Alpini Regiment, the command of the Alpini Battalion "Tolmezzo", as well as the 72nd Alpini Company and 212th Anti-tank Company "Val Tagliamento", were disbanded in Venzone, while the "Tolmezzo" battalion's 114th Mortar Company was renumbered 115th Mortar Company. On the same date, the 8th Alpini Regiment's Alpini Battalion "Gemona" in Cividale disbanded its 70th and 71st Alpini Company, as well as battalion's Command and Logistic Support Company and the 155th Mortar Company. Furthermore, on the same date the Alpini Battalion "Gemona" was renamed Alpini Battalion "Tolmezzo". This reorganization was undertaken to keep at least one company of each of the traditional battalions of the 8th Alpini Regiment in active service: with the 6th and 12th Alpini companies drawn from the Alpini Battalion "Tolmezzo", the 69th Alpini Company drawn from the Alpini Battalion "Gemona", the 115th Mortar Company drawn from the Alpini Battalion "Cividale", and the 216th Anti-tank Company "Val Natisone" drawn from the Alpini Battalion "Val Natisone". When the 14th Alpini Regiment was disbanded it had the following organization:

- 14th Alpini Regiment, in Venzone
  - Command and Logistic Support Company
  - Alpini Battalion "Tolmezzo"
    - 6th, 12th, and 72nd Alpini Company
    - 114th Mortar Company
    - 212th Anti-Tank Company "Val Tagliamento"

=== Reactivation ===
On 1 October 2022, the flag and traditions of the 14th Alpini Regiment were assigned to the Command and Tactical Supports Unit "Julia" of the Alpine Brigade "Julia". On the same day the unit was renamed 14th Alpini Command and Tactical Supports Unit.

== Organization ==
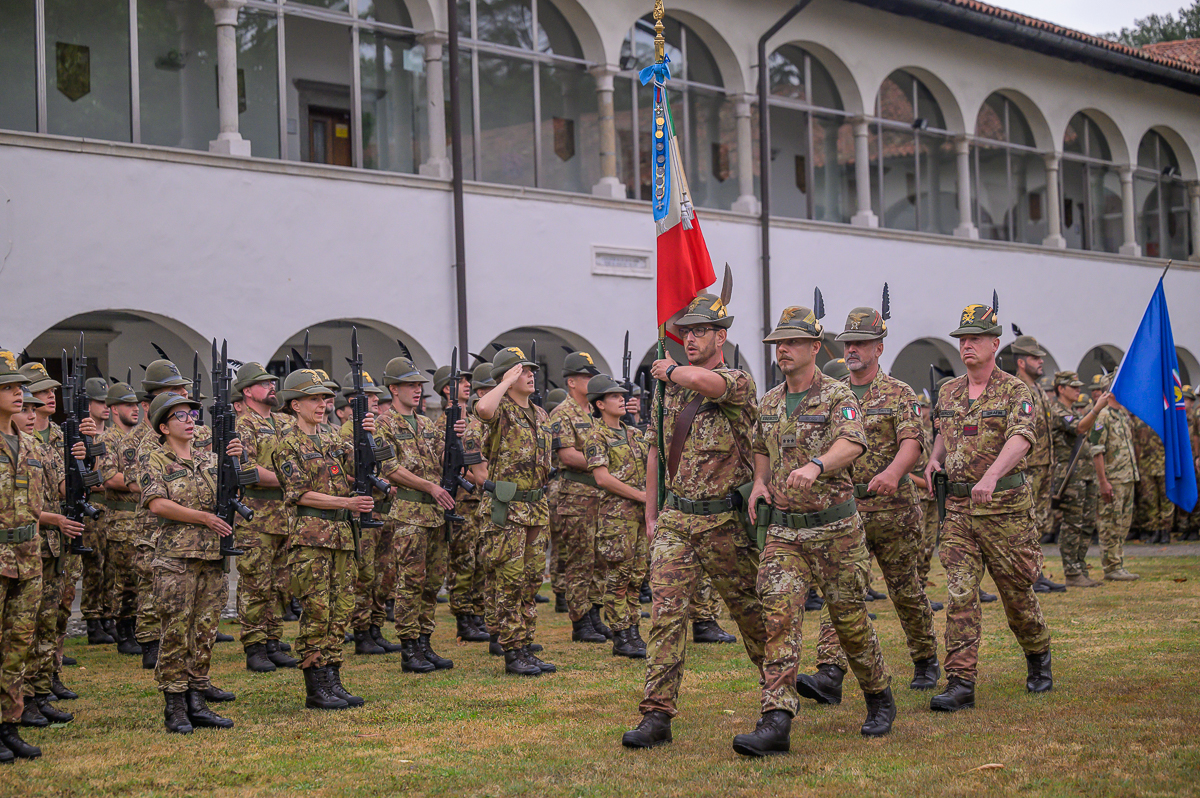
14th Alpini Regiment flag on parade in July 2026

As of 2026 the 14th Alpini Command and Tactical Supports Unit is organized as follows:

- 14th Alpini Command and Tactical Supports Unit, in Udine
  - Command and Logistic Support Company
  - Signal Company

== See also ==
- Alpine Brigade "Julia"
