= Alpine Brigade "Julia" =

- Brigata Alpina "Julia"
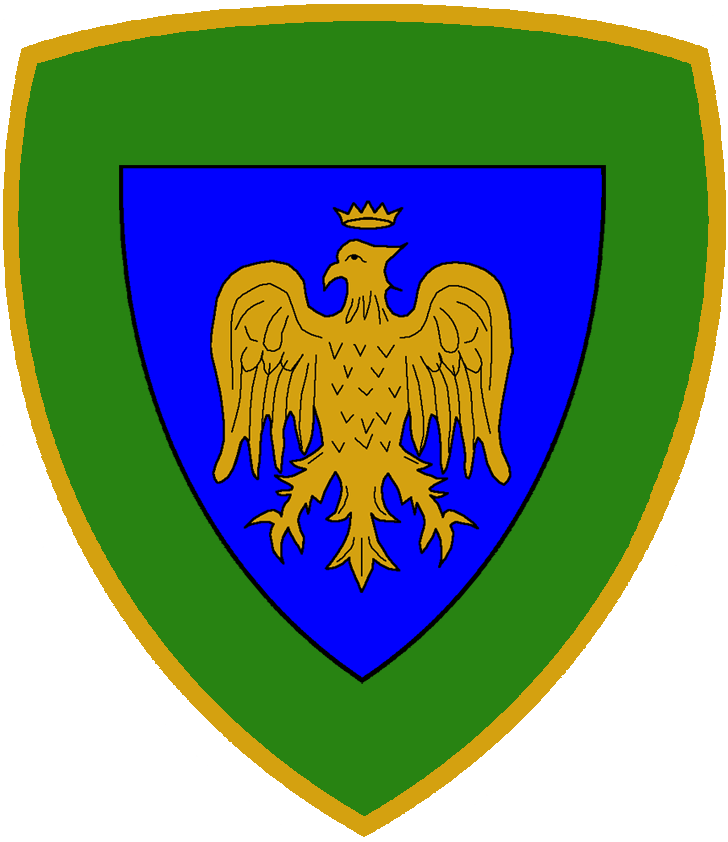
- Coat of Arms of the Alpine Brigade "Julia"
- Active: 15 October 1949 – present Alpine Brigade "Julia"
- Country: Italy
- Branch: Italian Army
- Role: Alpini
- Size: Brigade
- Part of: Alpine Troops Command
- Garrison/HQ: Udine
- Colors: green
- Engagements: Bosnia SFOR; Kosovo KFOR; Afghanistan ISAF

The Alpine Brigade "Julia" is a light infantry brigade of the Italian Army, specializing in mountain warfare. Its core units are Alpini, an infantry corps of the Italian Army, that distinguished itself during World War I and World War II. The brigade carries on the name and traditions of the 3rd Alpine Division "Julia". The division's and brigade's name allude to the Julian Alps in the Friuli region where the division's regiments recruited their troops, and where after World War II the brigade was based. Accordingly, the brigade's coat of arms is modeled after the Friuli region's coat of arms.

The brigade supplies the headquarters and most units to the former Multinational Land Force, also known as the Italian-Hungarian-Slovenian Battlegroup. Component parts from the other two countries were the Slovenian 10th Motorized Battalion and the Hungarian 1st Light Infantry Battalion.

== History ==
=== Constitution ===
The Julia was constituted on 15 October 1949 in the city of Cividale del Friuli. During the Cold War the brigade was the Italian Army's biggest brigade with around 10,000 men and was tasked to defend the Plöcken and Naßfeld passes with Austria in case Warsaw Pact forces would attack through neutral Austria. The brigade covered the left flank of the Italian 5th Army Corps, which was based along the Italian-Yugoslavian border and tasked to prevent an enemy breakthrough into the Northern Italian plain. Initially the brigade was composed as follows:

- Alpine Brigade "Julia", in Cividale del Friuli
  - 8th Alpini Regiment, in Udine
    - Headquarters Platoon
    - Alpini Battalion "Feltre" (battalion name transferred to the 7th Alpini Regiment of the Alpine Brigade "Cadore" on 1 June 1956, battalion renamed "Gemona")
    - Alpini Battalion "Tolmezzo"
    - Alpini Battalion "Cividale"
    - Alpini Battalion "L'Aquila"
    - 8th Mortar Company
  - Mountain Artillery Group "Belluno", in Belluno (moved to Pontebba in 1952, and Tolmezzo in 1953)
  - Anti-tank Group "Julia", in Tarvisio (disbanded 14 December 1952)
  - 108th Field Hospital
  - 58th Kitchen Platoon

In the following years the brigade was augmented with further units:

- Headquarters Platoon (1950)
- Signal Company "Julia", in Udine (1 June 1950)
- 3rd Mountain Artillery Regiment, in Udine (1 February 1951) with:
  - Command Unit, in Udine (1 April 1951)
  - Mountain Artillery Group "Conegliano", in Udine (1 May 1951)
  - Light Anti-aircraft Group "Julia", in Udine (joined the brigade on 1 July 1951, transferred to the 5th Heavy Anti-aircraft Artillery Regiment on 13 May 1957)
- Engineer Company "Julia" (1 April 1951)
- Mountain Artillery Group "Gemona", in Tai di Cadore (1 April 1951, renamed "Udine" 1 January 1957)
- Alpini Paratroopers Platoon, in Udine (1953)
- 11th Frontier Defense Regiment, in Tolmezzo (raised 1 September 1952, joined the brigade in May 1954; renamed 11th Alpini Fortification Regiment on 1 January 1957) with the battalions:
  - XII° Battalion (renamed Alpini Battalion "Val Fella" on 1 July 1963)
  - XIII° Battalion (created in 1959 and renamed Alpini Battalion "Val Natisone" on 1 July 1963)
  - XIV Battalion (disbanded in 1962)
  - XV° Battalion (renamed Alpini Battalion "Val Tagliamento" on 1 July 1963)
  - XVI° Battalion (disbanded in 1962)
- Services Grouping "Julia" (1955)
- Light Aircraft Section "Julia" (raised in 1956 as part of the 3rd Mountain Artillery Regiment, transferred to the brigade in 1958)
- Mountain Artillery Group "Osoppo", in Pontebba (15 October 1961)

On 26 October 1962 the Alpini Battalion "Mondovì" of the Alpine Brigade "Taurinense" moved to Paluzza in the Friuli-Venezia Giulia region to augment the Julia, followed by the Taurinense's Mountain Artillery Group "Pinerolo" on 1 December 1963, which moved to Tolmezzo. With this the Julia reached its peak strength in men, units and equipment. For the next 30 years the Julia remained the biggest brigade of the Italian Army. At the start of 1964 the brigade was composed as follows:

- Alpine Brigade "Julia", in Udine
  - Headquarters and Headquarters Company, in Udine
  - 8th Alpini Regiment, in Tolmezzo
    - Headquarter Company, in Tolmezzo
    - Alpini Battalion "Gemona", in Pontebba and Ugovizza
    - Alpini Battalion "Tolmezzo", in Venzone and Moggio Udinese
    - Alpini Battalion "Cividale", in Chiusaforte
    - Alpini Battalion "L'Aquila", in Tarvisio
    - Alpini Battalion "Mondovì", in Paluzza, Paularo and Forni Avoltri
    - 8th Mortar Company, in Tolmezzo (disbanded on 31 December 1964)
  - 11th Alpini Fortification Regiment, in Tolmezzo
    - Command Company, in Tolmezzo
    - Alpini Battalion "Val Tagliamento", in Tolmezzo and Paluzza
    - Alpini Battalion "Val Fella", in Pontebba and Ugovizza
    - Alpini Battalion "Val Natisone", in Stazione Carnia and Cavazzo Carnico (disbanded on 30 June 1964, companies transferred to the Val Tagliamento battalion)
  - 3rd Mountain Artillery Regiment, in Gemona
    - Command and Services Battery, in Gemona
    - Mountain Artillery Group "Belluno", in Tarvisio
    - Mountain Artillery Group "Conegliano", in Gemona
    - Mountain Artillery Group "Udine", in Tolmezzo
    - Mountain Artillery Group "Osoppo", in Pontebba
    - Mountain Artillery Group "Pinerolo", in Tolmezzo and Paularo
  - Alpini (Recruits Training) Battalion "Julia", in L'Aquila and Teramo
  - Services Grouping "Julia", in Udine
  - Engineer Company "Julia", in Gemona
  - Signal Company "Julia", in Udine
  - Alpini Paratroopers Platoon, in Udine
  - Light Aviation Unit "Julia", at Udine-Campoformido Air Base

The Alpini Paratroopers Platoon merged with the paratrooper platoons of the other four alpine brigades on 1 April 1964 to form the Alpini Paratroopers Company in Bolzano under direct command of the 4th Army Corps.

=== 1975 Reorganization ===
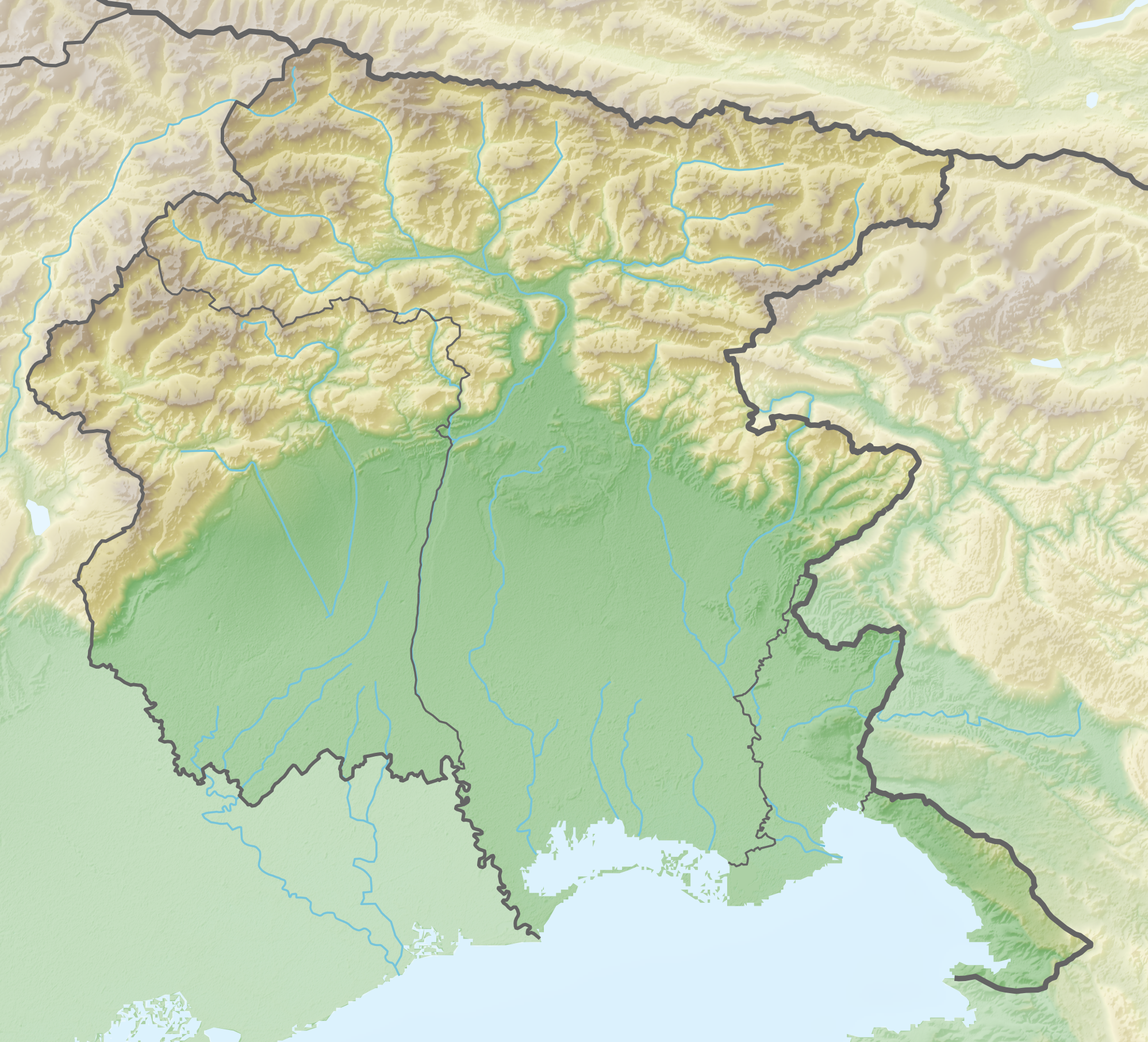
"Julia" locations in 1989

With 1975 Italian Army reform the regimental level was abolished and battalions came under direct command of multi-arms brigades. At the same time the army reduced and realigned its forces and therefore the Julia saw major changes to its composition: the 8th Alpini Regiment, 3rd Mountain Artillery Regiment, and 11th Alpini Fortification Grouping were disbanded. The Alpini Battalion "Cividale" moved to Tarvisio, while the Alpini Battalion "Tolmezzo" and Alpini Battalion "Gemona" were disbanded with their names transferred to the Alpini Battalion "Mondovì" respectively Alpini Battalion "L'Aquila". The name "Mondovì" was transferred to the Alpini Battalion "Orobica" of the 2nd Alpini Regiment of the Alpine Brigade "Taurinense", while the name "L'Aquila" was transferred to the Alpini (Recruits Training) Battalion "Julia", which became an active unit. As new training unit the Alpini (Recruits Training) Battalion "Vicenza" was raised in Tolmezzo, which moved subsequently to Codroipo. The Alpini Battalion "Val Tagliamento" moved to Tolmezzo and received the 269th Company and five reserve companies from the disbanded Alpini Battalion "Val Fella". The Mountain Artillery Group "Belluno" was disbanded and its name transferred to the Mountain Artillery Group "Osoppo", while the Mountain Artillery Group "Pinerolo" was disbanded and its name transferred to the Mountain Artillery Group "Susa" of the Alpine Brigade "Taurinense". The Mountain Artillery Group "Conegliano" moved to Udine, while the brigade headquarters and the signal company were merged to form the Command and Signal Unit "Julia", and the Services Grouping "Julia" was reorganized as a logistic battalion. An anti-tank company was raised, while the Light Aviation Unit "Julia" was disbanded.

After the reform the brigade's four Alpini battalions had an authorized strength of 950 men, with the exception of the "Val Tagliamento" battalion, which was tasked to man fortifications in the upper Canal valley. The "Val Tagliamento" 16 Alpini companies for an organic strength of almost 2,500 men. The brigade's three artillery groups had an authorized strength of 610 men and fielded 18 M56 105mm pack howitzers each. The new composition was:

- Alpine Brigade "Julia", in Udine
  - Command and Signal Unit "Julia", in Udine
  - Alpini Battalion "Gemona", in Tarvisio
    - Command and Services Company
    - 69th Alpini Company
    - 70th Alpini Company
    - 71st Alpini Company
    - 155th Heavy Mortar Company
  - Alpini Battalion "Tolmezzo", in Paluzza
    - Command and Services Company
    - 6th Alpini Company, in Forni Avoltri
    - 12th Alpini Company
    - 72nd Alpini Company
    - 114th Heavy Mortar Company
  - Alpini Battalion "Cividale", in Tarvisio (moved to Chiusaforte in 1979)
    - Command and Services Company
    - 16th Alpini Company
    - 20th Alpini Company
    - 76th Alpini Company
    - 115th Heavy Mortar Company
  - Alpini Battalion "L'Aquila", in L'Aquila
    - Command and Services Company
    - 93rd Alpini Company
    - 108th Alpini Company
    - 143rd Alpini Company
    - 119th Heavy Mortar Company
  - Alpini Battalion "Val Tagliamento", in Tolmezzo (Nappina color denotes the original battalion: = Val Tagliamento, = Val Fella, = Val Natisone)
    - Command and Services Company, in Tolmezzo
    - 212th Alpini Company (Type A^{*}, Plöcken Pass fortifications)
    - 216th Alpini Company (Type B^{*}, Campiolo fortifications)
    - 220th Alpini Company (Type C^{*}, Portis fortifications)
    - 269th Alpini Company (Type B, Ugovizza fortifications)
    - 270th Alpini Company (Type C, Malborghetto fortifications)
    - 271st Alpini Company (Type C, Val d'Uque fortifications)
    - 272nd Alpini Company (Type C, Torre Moscarda fortifications)
    - 273rd Alpini Company (Type C, Tratte fortifications)
    - 278th Alpini Company (Type C, Stua di Ramaz fortifications)
    - 288th Alpini Company (Type C, Cavazzo fortifications)
    - 306th Alpini Company (Type C, Sella Sompdogna fortifications)
    - 307th Alpini Company (Type C, Sella Nevea fortifications)
    - 308th Alpini Company (Type B, Sella Carnizza fortifications)
    - 312th Alpini Company (Type C, Case Marco fortifications)
    - 313th Alpini Company (Type C, Cereschiatis fortifications)
    - 314th Alpini Company (Type C, Ponte del Cristo fortifications)
  - Alpini (Recruits Training) Battalion "Vicenza", in Codroipo
    - Command and Services Company
    - 59th Alpini Company
    - 60th Alpini Company
    - 61st Alpini Company, in Teramo
    - 117th Alpini Company
  - Mountain Artillery Group "Belluno", in Pontebba (disbanded 31 October 1989)
    - Command and Services Battery
    - 22nd Mountain Artillery Battery
    - 23rd Mountain Artillery Battery
    - 24th Mountain Artillery Battery
  - Mountain Artillery Group "Conegliano", in Udine
    - Command and Services Battery
    - 13th Mountain Artillery Battery
    - 14th Mountain Artillery Battery
    - 15th Mountain Artillery Battery in L'Aquila
  - Mountain Artillery Group "Udine", in Tolmezzo (renamed Light Anti-aircraft Artillery Group "Udine" on 6 December 1991)
    - Command and Services Battery
    - 17th Mountain Artillery Battery
    - 18th Mountain Artillery Battery
    - 34th Mountain Artillery Battery
  - Logistic Battalion "Julia", in Udine
    - Command and Services Platoon
    - 1st Light Logistic Unit
    - 2nd Light Logistic Unit
    - 3rd Light Logistic Unit
    - Medium Logistic Unit
  - Anti-tank Company "Julia", in Cavazzo Carnico
  - Engineer Company "Julia", in Gemona
- _{Type A = fortification fully equipped, provisioned and manned; close support platoon onsite}
- _{Type B = fortification fully equipped, provisioned and manned; close support platoon off site}
- _{Type C = fortification fully equipped; provisions, crew and close support platoon off site}

==== Strategic planning ====
After the 1975 reform the 4th Alpine Army Corps was responsible to defend the Italian border along the main chain of the alps from the Swiss-Austrian-Italian border tripoint in the west to the Italian-Yugoslavian border in the east. In case of war with Yugoslavia the 4th Alpine Army Corps would remain static in its position guarding the left flank of the 5th Army Corps, which would meet the enemy forces in the plains of Friuli-Venezia Giulia. The only brigade which would have seen combat in such a case would have been the Julia.

In case of a war with the Warsaw Pact the 4th Alpine Army Corps had two war planes: one in the case the Soviet Southern Group of Forces and Hungarian Army would march through Yugoslavia and the other in case the Warsaw Pact would violate the Austrian neutrality and march through Austria. In case the enemy forces would come through Yugoslavia, the Julia would cover the mountainous left flank of the 5th Army Corps, which with its four armoured and five mechanized brigades would try to wear down the enemy before it could break out into the North Italian Padan plain. The other alpine brigades would remain static.

In the more likely case the Soviet and Hungarian divisions would invade Austria and march through Southern Styria and through the Drava valley in Carinthia the alpine brigades would have been the first front line units of the Italian Army. The Cadore would have defended the Piave Valley, the Tridentina the Puster Valley, while the Orobica had a special mission and the Taurinense would remain in reserve. In this scenario the Julia was expected to be the first Italian unit to encounter Warsaw Pact forces and to take the brunt of the enemy strength as the brigade was based in the middle of the assumed line of advance of enemy forces. Marching through the Austrian Drava valley Eastern forces were expected to turn left at Villach and try to cross the Alps through the Canal Valley, which was garrisoned by the Julia's Gemona battalion at the border in Tarvisio and the Cividale battalion further down the valley in Chiusaforte, with the Gemona battalion being supported by the Belluno artillery group in Pontebba and the Cividale battalion supported by the Conegliano artillery group in Udine. The Gemona was to block the Canal Valley right at the border, while the Cividale was tasked to defend the Naßfeld Pass on the Gemona's left flank. Further West the Tolmezzo battalion was stationed in Paluzza and tasked with defending the Plöcken Pass, as a breakthrough there would have allowed enemy forces to march through the valley into the rear of the other Julia units. The Tolmezzo battalion was to be supported by the Udine artillery group.

Additionally the Val Tagliamento battalion, the biggest battalion of the Italian Army, based in Tolmezzo near the Southern end of the Canal Valley fielded 16 companies and had an organic strength of over 2,500 men, which were tasked to man the Alpine Wall fortifications in the aforementioned valleys. As a Warsaw Pact attack through the Canal Valley was considered to be the most likely scenario the Julia was by far the strongest brigade of the Italian Army with more than 10,000 men.

In case the Julia would have failed to hold the Canal Valley the 3rd Missile Brigade "Aquileia" with its MGM-52 Lance surface-to-surface missiles and M115 203 mm towed howitzers would have turned the Canal Valley into a nuclear wasteland. This mission was taken over in 1985 by the 27th Self-propelled Heavy Artillery Group "Marche", which fielded M110 203 mm self-propelled howitzers and had its W33 nuclear shells stored at the "San Bernardo" ammunition depot in Reana del Rojale. The Marche fielded two firing batteries with 4 artillery systems per battery and had 140 nuclear artillery shells to fulfil its task. In the late 1980s the W33 nuclear artillery shells were replaced with fewer but more powerful W79 nuclear artillery shells.

=== 1990s reorganization ===
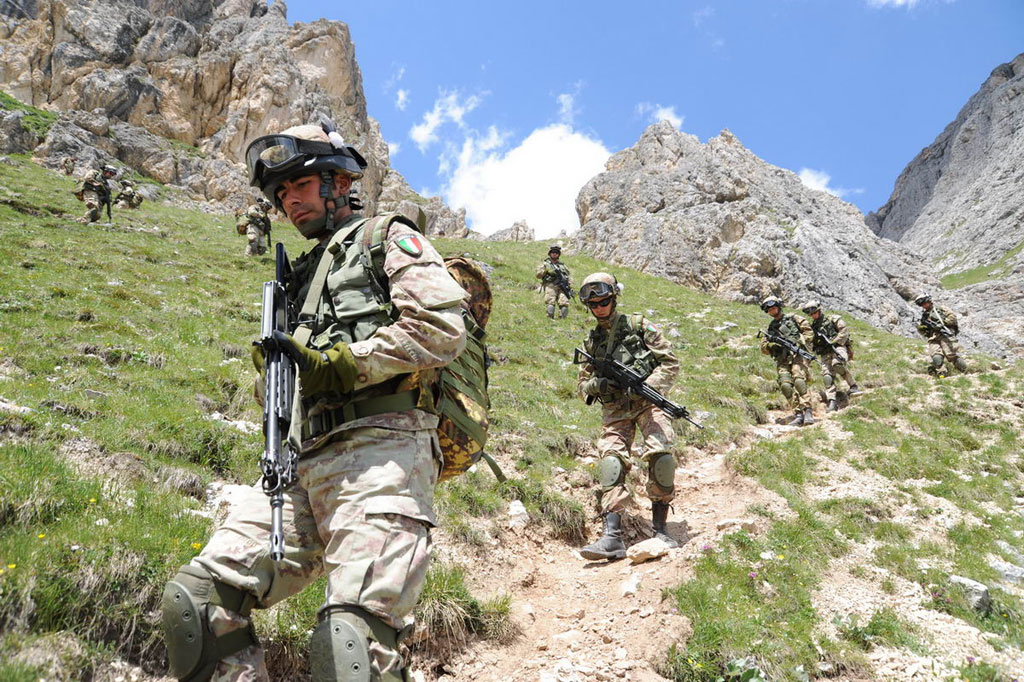
7th Alpini Regiment during the Falzarego 2011 exercise

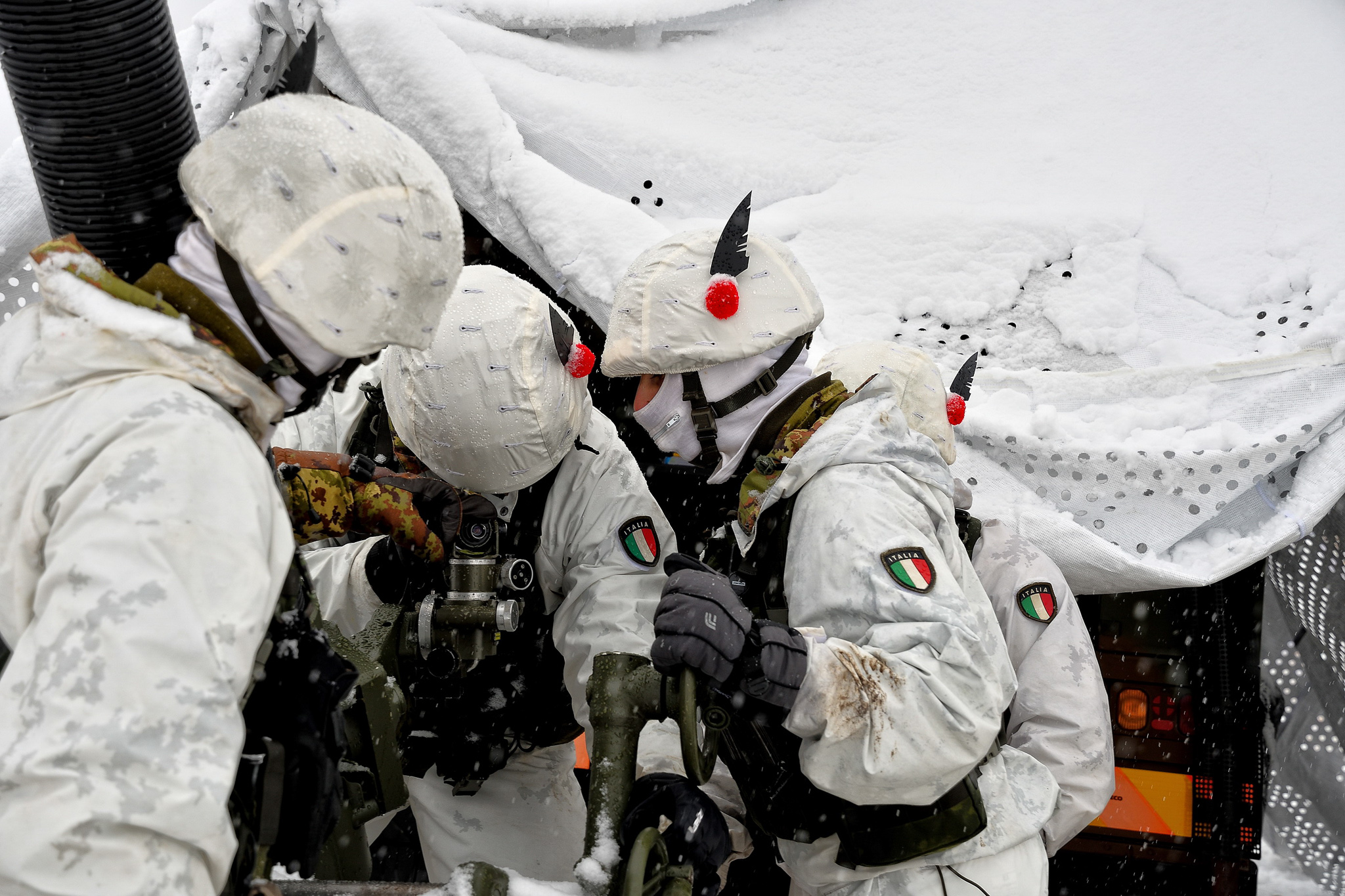
8th Alpini Regiment mortar team

On 26 September 1992 the Val Tagliamento battalion was disbanded. In August 1992 the battalions took the names of historical Alpini regiments to carry on the regimental traditions. Each regiment consisted of one of the brigade's Alpini battalions and an additional support company. Furthermore, the Anti-tank Company was disbanded and the Command and Signal Unit was merged with the Engineer Company into the Command and Tactical Supports Unit. The new composition was:

- Alpine Brigade "Julia", in Udine
  - Command and Tactical Supports Unit "Julia", in Udine
  - 8th Alpini Regiment Alpini Battalion "Gemona", in Tarvisio (moved to Cividale del Friuli in 1997)
  - 9th Alpini Regiment Alpini Battalion "L'Aquila", in L'Aquila (transferred to the Alpine Brigade "Taurinense" on 1 September 1997)
  - 14th Alpini Regiment Alpini Battalion "Tolmezzo", in Paluzza (disbanded 14 October 2005)
  - 15th Alpini Regiment Alpini Battalion "Cividale", in Chiusaforte (disbanded 11 November 1995)
  - 3rd Mountain Artillery Regiment, in Udine
    - Mountain Artillery Group "Conegliano", in Udine
    - Light Anti-aircraft Artillery Group "Udine", in Tolmezzo (disbanded 11 November 1995)
  - Alpini (Recruits Training) Battalion "Vicenza", in Codroipo (disbanded on 13 September 1996)
  - Logistic Battalion "Julia", in Udine (disbanded 29 January 2002)

With the suppression of the Alpine Brigade "Cadore" on 10 January 1997, the two remaining regiments of that brigade passed to the Julia:

- 7th Alpini Regiment Alpini Battalion "Feltre", in Feltre
- 16th Regiment "Belluno" Alpini (Recruits Training) Battalion "Belluno", in Belluno (ceded to Alpine Troops Command on 1 January 1998)

With the suppression of the Alpine Brigade "Tridentina" on 1 July 2002, the sole remaining regiment of that brigade passed to the Julia:

- 5th Alpini Regiment Alpini Battalion "Morbegno", in Sterzing

Furthermore, in 2002 the Julia received the 2nd Alpine Engineer Regiment Sapper Battalion "Iseo" in Trento from the Alpine Troops Command.

== Organization ==
Julia units in 2022

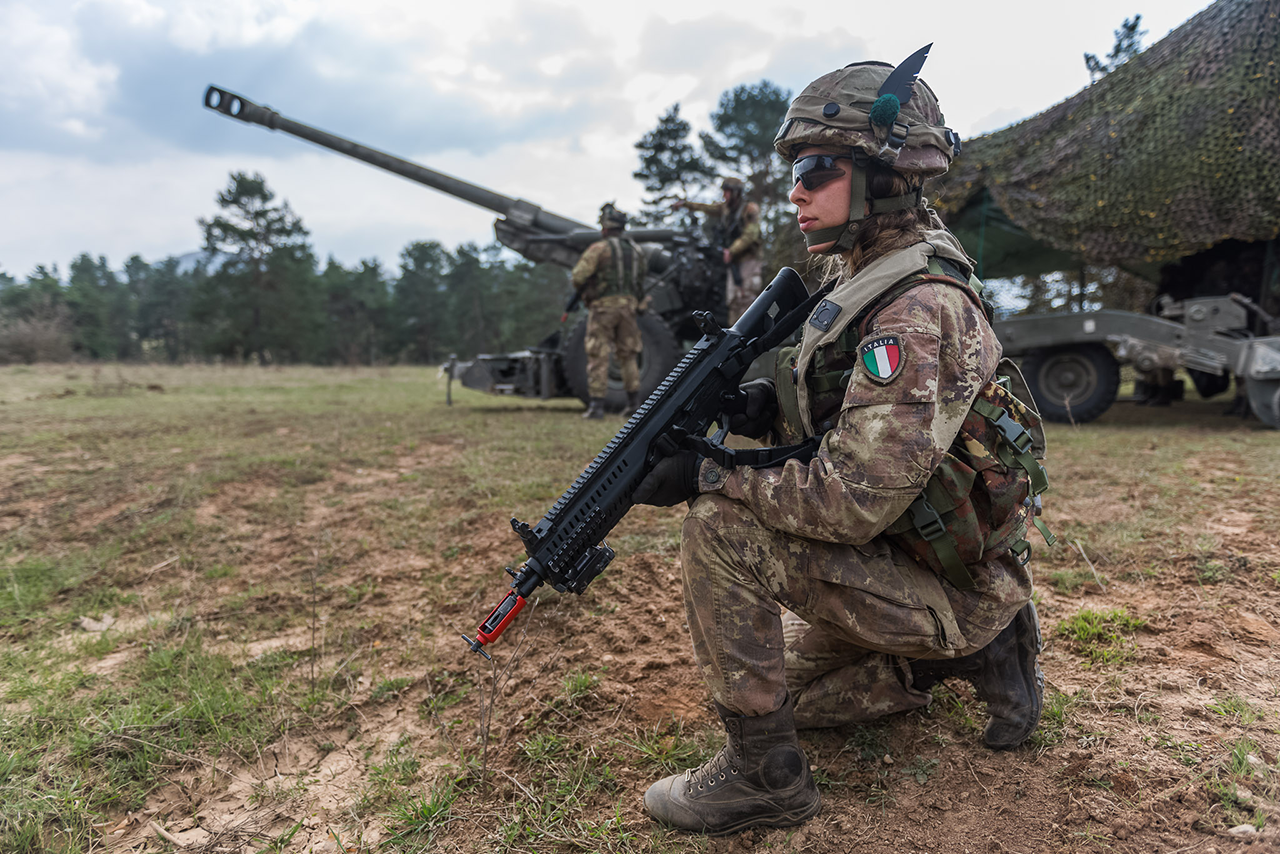
3rd Field Artillery Regiment (Mountain) at the Hohenfels Training Area

The brigade is based in the eastern half of northern Italy and part of the Alpine Troops Command. The headquarter is in the city of Udine. In 2013 the brigade received the reconnaissance Regiment "Piemonte Cavalleria" (2nd) from the Cavalry Brigade "Pozzuolo del Friuli". As of 4 October 2022 the brigade is organized as follows:

- Alpine Brigade "Julia", in Udine
  - 14th Alpini Command and Tactical Supports Unit, in Udine
    - Command Company
    - Signal Company
  - Regiment "Piemonte Cavalleria" (2nd), in Villa Opicina
    - Command and Logistic Support Squadron
    - Armored Squadrons Group
  - 5th Alpini Regiment, in Sterzing
    - Command and Logistic Support Company
    - Alpini Battalion "Morbegno"
  - 7th Alpini Regiment, in Belluno
    - Command and Logistic Support Company
    - Alpini Battalion "Feltre"
  - 8th Alpini Regiment, in Venzone
    - Command and Logistic Support Company
    - Alpini Battalion "Tolmezzo"
  - 3rd Field Artillery Regiment (Mountain), in Remanzacco
    - Command and Logistic Support Battery
    - 24th Surveillance, Target Acquisition and Tactical Liaison Battery
    - Mountain Artillery Group "Conegliano"
  - 2nd Engineer Regiment, in Trento
    - Command and Logistic Support Company
    - Sapper Battalion "Iseo"
  - Logistic Regiment "Julia", in Merano
    - Command and Logistic Support Company
    - Logistic Battalion

== Equipment ==
The Alpini regiments are equipped with Bv 206S tracked all-terrain carriers and Lince light multirole vehicles. The maneuver support companies of the Alpini regiments are equipped with 120 mm mortars and Spike anti-tank guided missile systems. The cavalry regiment is equipped with Centauro tank destroyers and VTLM Lince vehicles. The brigade's artillery regiment fields 12× FH-70 155 mm howitzers and 6× Mod 56 105 mm howitzers.

== Gorget patches ==
The personnel of the brigade's units wears the following gorget patches:

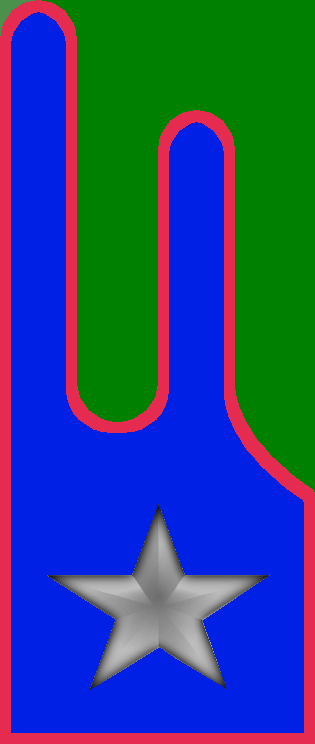
14th Alpini Command and Tactical Supports Unit

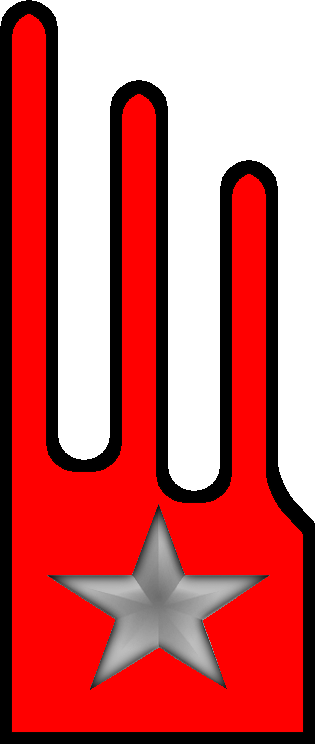
Regiment "Piemonte Cavalleria" (2nd)

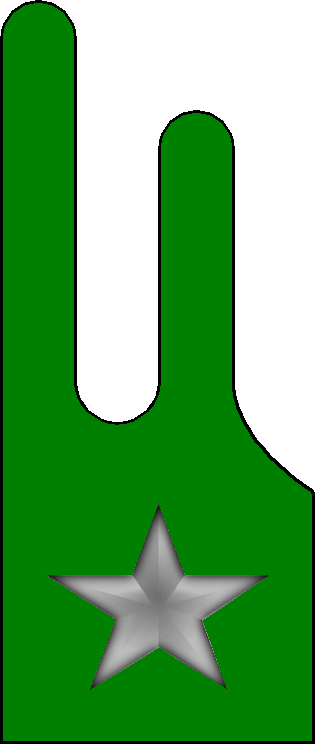
5th Alpini, 7th Alpini, and 8th Alpini Regiment

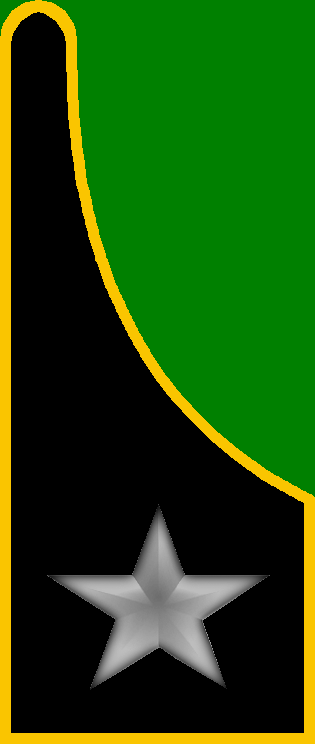
3rd Field Artillery Regiment (Mountain)

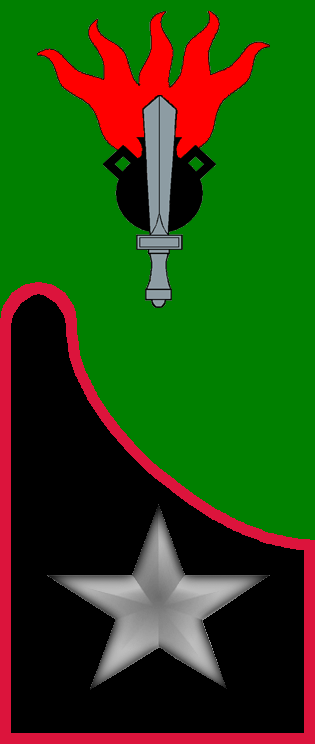
2nd Engineer Regiment

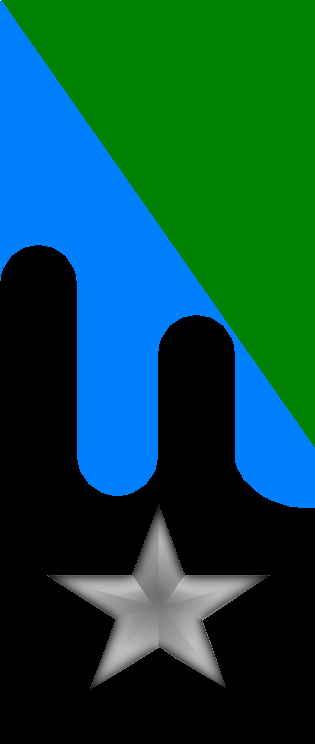
Logistic Regiment "Julia"

== Band ==
The military band of the Julia Brigade was formed on 1 October 1967 during the procession of the change of the Brigade Commander. It made its debut in Venzone at the "Feruglio" barracks. The nucleus of the band are musicians coming from the Alpine Regiments, all of which have experience in civilian city bands. It currently has 42 musicians, located in Udine. The repertoire consists of pieces by Gioacchino Rossini, Giacomo Puccini, Giuseppe Verdi, Glenn Miller, and George Gershwin. Its primary activity consists of participation in ceremonial ceremonies and events, concerts in various cities of Italy and abroad, and in the numerous international military tattoos/festivals.

== See also ==
- 3rd Alpine Division "Julia"

== Sources ==
- Italian Army Homepage: Alpine Brigade Julia
