= 15th Alpini Regiment =

Inactive Italian Army mountain infantry unit

- 15° Reggimento Alpini
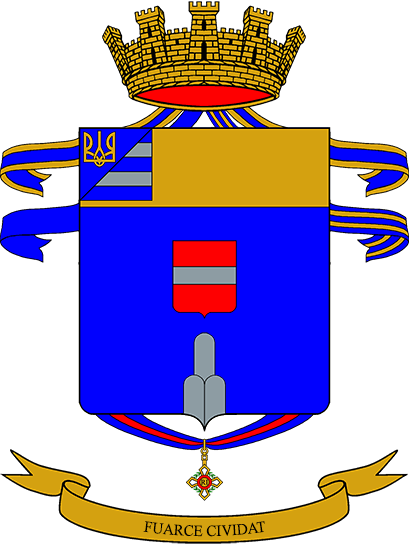
- Regimental coat of arms
- Active: 1 Oct. 1975 – 9 Oct. 1995
- Country: Italy
- Branch: Italian Army
- Type: Mountain Infantry
- Part of: Alpine Brigade "Julia"
- Garrison/HQ: Chiusaforte
- Motto: "Fuarce Cividat"
- Anniversaries: 5 January 1943
- Decorations: 1× Military Order of Italy; 2× Gold Medals of Military Valor; 1× Bronze Medal of Military Valor; 1× Silver Medal of Army Valor; 1× Gold Cross of Army Merit

Insignia
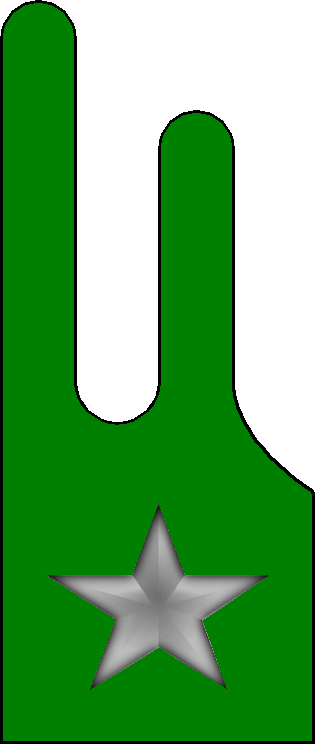
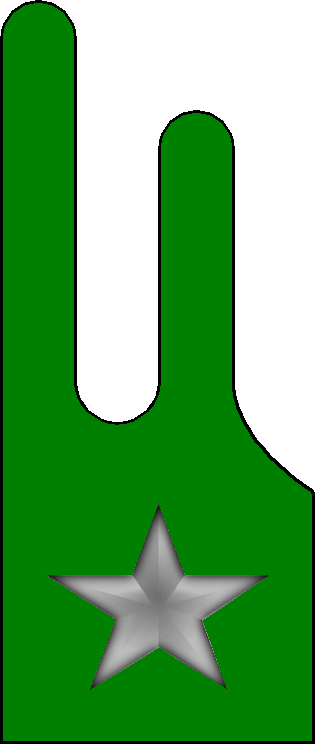
- Alpini gorget patches

The 15th Alpini Regiment (Italian: 15° Reggimento Alpini) is an inactive mountain warfare regiment of the Italian Army last based in Chiusaforte in Friuli-Venezia Giulia. The regiment belongs to the Italian Army's Alpini infantry speciality and was assigned to the Alpine Brigade "Julia". The regiment was formed in 1992 and consisted of the Alpini Battalion "Cividale", whose flag and traditions it inherited. The regiment's anniversary falls on 5 January 1943, the day of the Battle of Novaya Kalitva in the Soviet Union.

In 1909, the 8th Alpini Regiment formed the Alpini Battalion "Cividale" in Cividale. During World War I the battalion fought in the alpine areas of the Italian front. In World War II the battalion fought in the Greco-Italian War and on the Eastern Front, where the battalion was almost completely destroyed during the Red Army's Operation Little Saturn in winter 1942–43. On 8 September 1943, the Armistice of Cassibile was announced and five days later, on 13 September 1943, invading German forces disbanded the 8th Alpini Regiment and its battalions.

The battalion was reformed in 1948 and assigned to the 8th Alpini Regiment. In 1975 the 8th Alpini Regiment was disbanded and the "Cividlae" battalion became an autonomous unit, which in 1976 was granted its own flag. The battalion was assigned to the Alpine Brigade "Julia". In 1992, the battalion entered the newly created 15th Alpini Regiment. The regiment was disbanded in 1995. The regiment's anniversary falls on 5 January 1943, the day of the Battle of Novaya Kalitva in the Soviet Union.

== History ==
On 1 October 1909, the Royal Italian Army formed the 8th Alpini Regiment in Udine and the Alpini Battalion "Cividale" in Cividale. The new battalion consisted of the 16th and 20th Alpini companies, which had been ceded by the Alpini battalion "Vinadio" and "Dronero" of the 2nd Alpini Regiment, and the newly formed 76th Alpini Company. On the same day the new regiment received the Alpini Battalion "Tolmezzo" and the Alpini Battalion "Gemona" from the 7th Alpini Regiment. The regiment's battalions, like all Alpini battalions at the time, were named for the cities and towns, where their base was located. Since 1886 Alpini soldiers and non-commissioned officers were issued thread tufts, called Nappina in Italian, which were clipped to the Cappello Alpino headdress, and colored white for the troops of a regiment's first battalion, red for the troops of a regiment's second battalion, green for the troops of a regiment's third battalion, and blue for the troops of a regiment's fourth battalion. As the youngest, and thus third battalion of the 8th Alpini Regiment, the "Cividale" battalion received a green Nappina.

=== World War I ===
At the outbreak of World War I Italy declared its neutrality. In the autumn of 1914 the eight Alpini regiments formed 38 additional Alpini companies with men, who had completed their military service in the preceding four years. These companies were numbered from 80th to 117th and assigned to the existing Alpini battalions. The "Cividale" battalion formed the 110th Alpini Company, and then consisted of four companies. In January 1915, each Alpini battalion began with the formation of a reserve battalion, with men, who had completed their military service at least four years, but not more than eleven years prior. These reserve battalions were named for a valley (Italian: Valle; abbreviated Val) located near their associated regular Alpini battalion's base, and the reserve battalions received the same Nappina as their associated regular Alpini battalion. The "Cividale" battalion formed the Alpini Battalion "Val Natisone", which consisted of the 216th, 220th, and 279th Alpini Company.

On 23 May 1915, Italy declared war on Austro-Hungary and the Alpini Battalion "Cividale" occupied positions in the southwestern Julian Alps in the Tolmin area and Kobarid area. In May and June the battalion fought for the summits surrounding Mount Krn: Ježa, Kožljak, Pleče, Batognica. As the mountainous terrain of the Italian front made the deployment of entire Alpini regiments impracticable the Alpini battalions were employed either independently or assigned to groups, groupings, or infantry divisions as needed. The rest of 1915 the battalion was deployed on Monte Vodel above Tolmin. By the end of 1915 the Alpini regiments began to form additional companies with recruits born in 1896. These new companies were numbered from 118th to 157th and were used, together with the 38 companies formed earlier, to form an additional reserve battalion for each regular battalion. These new battalions were named for a mountain (Italian: Monte) located near their associated regular Alpini battalion's base, and the reserve battalions received the same Nappina as their associated regular Alpini battalion. In December 1915, the Alpini Battalion "Cividale" ceded the 110th Alpini Company to the newly formed Alpini Battalion "Monte Matajur", which also included the 156th and 157th Alpini Company.

In January–April 1916, the Alpini Battalion "Cividale" was deployed on Monte Vršič and Monte Vrata. In May 1916, the battalion was sent to the Asiago Plateau, to reinforce the Italian lines during the Austro-Hungarian Army's Asiago Offensive. On 23–26 May 1916, the battalion withstood heavy Austro-Hungarian attacks on Monte Cimone, before being forces to retreat with the rest of the Italian units. In October of the same year, the battalion supported the Alpini Battalion "Val Tagliamento" during the attack on the Cima Busa Alta in the Lagorai range.

In February and March 1917 the Royal Italian Army formed twelve skiers battalions, each with two skiers companies. On 27 May 1917, the IX and XII Skiers battalions were disbanded and its personnel used to form the Alpini Battalion "Monte Nero", which was assigned to the 8th Alpini Regiment and consisted of the 294th, 295th, and 296th Alpini companies. The battalion was associated with the Alpini Battalion "Cividale" and therefore its troops wore a green Nappina.

In 1917, after the disastrous Battle of Caporetto and the following Italian retreat to the Piave river, the "Cividale" battalion fought in the First Battle of Monte Grappa on Monte Solarolo, Monte Spinoncia, and Monte Valderoa in the Monte Grappa massif. In October–November 1918, during the decisive Battle of Vittorio Veneto, the battalion was again deployed in the Monte Grappa massiv.

After the war the Alpini battalions "Cividale" and "Val Natisone" were awarded a shared Bronze Medal of Military Valor for the "Cividale" battalion's conduct on Monte Cimone during the Battle of Asiago on 23–26 May 1916, and for the "Val Natisone" battalion's conduct during the same battle at Le Buse, Schiri, on Monte Giove, and Monte Chiesa between 10 May and 9 July 1916. The medal was affixed to the flag of the 8th Alpini Regiment and added to the regiment's coat of arms.

=== Interwar years ===
In 1921, the 8th Alpini Regiment transferred the Alpini Battalion "Cividale" to the newly formed 9th Alpini Regiment and received in turn the Alpini Battalion "Verona" from the 6th Alpini Regiment. With the transfer of the battalions also the military awards of the battalions were transferred from regiment to regiment and affixed to the respective regimental flags. In November 1926, the Alpini Battalion "Cividale" returned to the 8th Alpini Regiment, which in turn returned the Alpini Battalion "Verona" to the 6th Alpini Regiment.

On 27 October 1934, the III Alpine Brigade was renamed III Superior Alpine Command. In December of the same year the command was given the name "Julio". On 31 October 1935, the III Superior Alpine Command "Julio" was reorganized as 3rd Alpine Division "Julia", which included the 7th Alpini Regiment, 8th Alpini Regiment, 9th Alpini Regiment, and 3rd Alpine Artillery Regiment "Julia".

On 7 April 1939, Italy invaded Albania and by the middle of April the 3rd Alpine Division "Julia" moved to Northern Albania, where its regiments garrisoned the border with the Kingdom of Yugoslavia.

=== World War II ===
==== Greco-Italian War ====
On 10 June 1940, Italy entered World War II and the Alpini Battalion "Cividale" consisted of a command company, and the 16th, 20th, and 76th Alpini companies. In September 1940, the 3rd Alpine Division "Julia" moved from Northern to Southern Albania and took up positions along the border with the Kingdom of Greece for the upcoming Italian invasion of Greece. On 28 October 1940, Italian forces invaded Greece and the 3rd Alpine Division "Julia" engaged Greek forces in the Battle of Pindus, during which the "Julia" division suffered heavy casualties. On 10 November, the "Julia" division was taken out of the line, but only four days later it had to return to the front in the Berat sector, where it came under heavy Greek attacks until 8 December. On 23 December 1940, the "Julia" division was again attacked by the Greeks; the attack lasted until 31 December and forced the division to retreat to the Mali i Qarrishtës ridge in extreme weather conditions. On 8 January 1941, a Greek offensive in the Berat sector hit the "Julia" division hard and the following day the division fell back once more. On 21 January 1941, the division was down to a single regiment with three understrength battalions. The remains of the "Julia" were withdrawn and transferred to Mavrovo, near Vlorë.

At the end of February the division, now 10,500 men strong, was sent again to the first line; on 24 February it was deployed on Mali i Golikut and along the Zagoria Valley. On 28 February a new battle was fought in the Tepelenë sector; the "Julia" division, as the last Italian unit defending the town, was attacked by the 2nd Greek Division, but managed to hold the front while suffering heavy casualties. On 7 March the Greeks attacked on Mali i Golikut, and two days later they renewed their attack, causing heavy losses; by 11 March the Greek offensive ended without taking Tepelenë, and both the "Julia" division and the two Greek divisions involved in the attack (the 2nd and the 17th) were worn out by the heavy fighting and losses.

In April 1941, following the German invasion and Axis occupation of Greece, the division was transferred to the Corinth Canal area and occupied the Peloponnese. During the Greco-Italian War the division had suffered overall 9,317 casualties: 49 officers and 1,625 soldiers during October–November 1940, 153 officers and 3,644 soldiers between December 1940 and January 1941, and 116 officers and 3,730 soldiers between February and April 1941. For its service and sacrifice on the Greek front between 28 October 1940 and 23 April 1941 the 8th Alpini Regiment was awarded a Gold Medal of Military Valor, which was affixed to the 8th Alpini Regiment's flag and added to the regiment's coat of arms.

On 15 February 1942, the 8th Alpini Regiment formed a support weapons company for each of its three battalions and the Alpini Battalion "Cividale" received the 115th Support Weapons Company. These companies were equipped with Breda M37 machine guns, and 45mm Mod. 35 and 81mm Mod. 35 mortars.

==== Eastern Front ====
On 2 March 1942, the 3rd Alpine Division "Julia" was assigned, together with the 2nd Alpine Division "Tridentina" and 4th Alpine Division "Cuneense", to the Alpine Army Corps. The corps was assigned to the Italian 8th Army, which was readied to be deployed in summer 1942 to the Eastern Front.

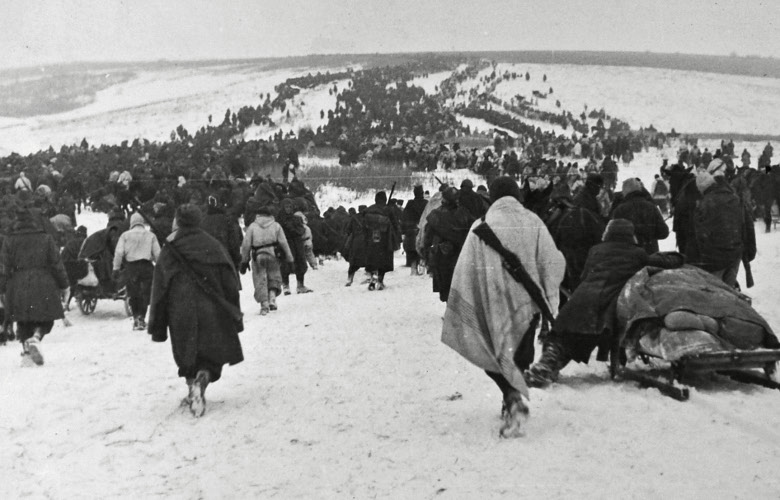
The Alpine Army Corps' retreat in Ukraine in January 1943

In July 1942 the three alpine division arrived in Eastern Ukraine, from where they marched eastwards towards the Don river. The Italian 8th Army covered the left flank of the German 6th Army, which spearheaded the German summer offensive of 1942 towards Stalingrad. On 12 December 1942, the Red Army commenced Operation Little Saturn, which, in its first stage, attacked and encircled the Italian II Army Corps and XXXV Army Corps, to the southeast of the Alpine Army Corps. On 4 January 1943, the "Cividale" battalion was given the task to retake Height 176 near Novaya Kalitva, which had fallen in Soviet hands. Over the following three days heavy fighting occurred, until the "Cividale" battalion took control of the important height and the Soviets ceased further attempts to take it. On 13 January 1943, the Red Army launched the second stage of Operation Little Saturn with the Voronezh Front encircling and destroying the Hungarian Second Army to the northwest of the Alpine Army Corps.

On the evening of 17 January 1943, the Alpine Army Corps commander, General Gabriele Nasci, ordered a full retreat. At this point only the 2nd Alpine Division "Tridentina" was still capable of conducting combat operations. The 40,000-strong mass of stragglers — Alpini and Italians from other commands, plus German and Hungarians — followed the "Tridentina", which led the way westwards to the new Axis lines. As the Soviets had already occupied every village, bitter battles had to be fought to clear the way. On the morning of 26 January 1943, the spearheads of the "Tridentina" reached the hamlet of Nikolayevka, occupied by the Soviet 48th Guards Rifle Division. The Soviets had fortified the railway embankment on both sides of the village. General Nasci ordered a frontal assault and by nightfall the troops of the "Tridentina" division had managed to break through the Soviet lines. The Italian troops continued their retreat, which was no longer contested by Soviet forces. On 1 February 1943 the remnants of the Alpine Army Corps reached Axis lines. Only 255 men of the "Cividale" battalion had made it to Axis lines, while more than 1,000 men perished during the combat along the Don river and the following retreat. For its bravery and sacrifice in the Soviet Union the 8th Alpini Regiment was awarded a Gold Medal of Military Valor, which was affixed to the regiment's flag and added to the regiment's coat of arms.

In early 1943, the regiment's depots in Italy formed the Alpini battalions "Gemona bis", "Tolmezzo bis", and "Cividale bis", which were deployed to the Isonzo valley to fight Yugoslav partisans. The three battalion were disbanded in June 1943 and their personnel assigned to the 8th Alpini Regiment. The 8th Alpini Regiment was still in the process of being rebuilt, when the Armistice of Cassibile was announced on 8 September 1943. Five days later, on 13 September 1943, the regiment and its battalions was disbanded by invading German forces.

=== Cold War ===
On 20 August 1948, the 8th Alpini Regiment reformed the Alpini Battalion "Cividale". On 15 October 1949, the 8th Alpini Regiment was assigned to the newly formed Alpine Brigade "Julia". By 1962, the "Cividale" battalion consisted of the following units:

- Alpini Battalion "Cividale", in Chiusaforte
  - Command and Services Company
  - 16th, 20th, and 76th Alpini Company
  - 115th Mortar Company, with 81mm M29 mortars

During the 1975 army reform the army disbanded the regimental level and newly independent battalions were granted for the first time their own flags. On 30 September 1975, the 8th Alpini Regiment was disbanded and the next day its battalions became autonomous units and were assigned to the Alpine Brigade "Julia". The Alpini Battalion "Cividale" was based in Chiusaforte and consisted of a command, a command and services company, three Alpini companies, and a heavy mortar company with eight 120mm Mod. 63 mortars. The battalion fielded now 950 men (45 officers, 96 non-commissioned officers, and 809 soldiers).

On 12 November 1976 the President of the Italian Republic Giovanni Leone granted the Alpini Battalion "Cividale" a new flag. At the same time the medals and military honors awarded to the "Cividale" battalion were transferred from the flag of the 8th Alpini Regiment to the battalion's flag, while the medals and military honors awarded to the entire regiment were duplicated for the flag of the battalion. Consequently, the "Cividale" battalion's flag was decorated with one Military Order of Italy, two Gold Medals of Military Valor, and one Bronze Medal of Military Valor. The awards were also added to the battalion's newly created coat of arms.

For its conduct and work after the 1976 Friuli earthquake the Alpini Battalion "Cividale" was awarded a Silver Medal of Army Valor, which was affixed to the battalion's flag and added to the battalion's coat of arms. As the battalion's base in Chiusaforte was destroyed by the earthquake, the "Cividale" battalion moved to Tarvisio, where the battalion remained until its base in Chiusaforte was rebuilt in 1979.

=== Recent times ===
On 9 October 1992, the Alpini Battalion "Cividale" lost its autonomy and the next day the battalion entered the newly formed 15th Alpini Regiment. During the same year the "Julia" brigade's Anti-Tank Company was disbanded and its personnel, with their TOW anti-tank guided missiles, assigned to the mortar companies of the brigade's battalions. Consequently, the 15th Alpini Regiment's 115th Mortar Company was renamed 115th Support Weapons Company. Between November 1993 and May 1994 the 15th Alpini Regiment served with the United Nations Operation in Mozambique. For its service in Mozambique the regiment was awarded a Gold Cross of Army Merit, which was affixed to the regiment's flag.

On 11 November 1995, the 15th Alpini Regiment was disbanded and on 16 November the flag of the regiment transferred to the Shrine of the Flags in the Vittoriano in Rome. On 14 October 2005, the Alpini Battalion "Tolmezzo" renumbered it's mortar company as 115th Mortar Company to keep one company of the Alpini Battalion "Cividale" in active service.

== Organization ==
When the 15th Alpini Regiment was disbanded it had the following organization:

- 15th Alpini Regiment, in Chiusaforte
  - Command and Logistic Support Company
  - Alpini Battalion "Cividale"
    - 16th, 20th, and 76th Alpini Company
    - 115th Support Weapons Company

== See also ==
- Alpine Brigade "Julia"
