= Logistic Battalion "Julia" =

Inactive Italian Army mountain logistics unit

- Battaglione Logistico "Julia"
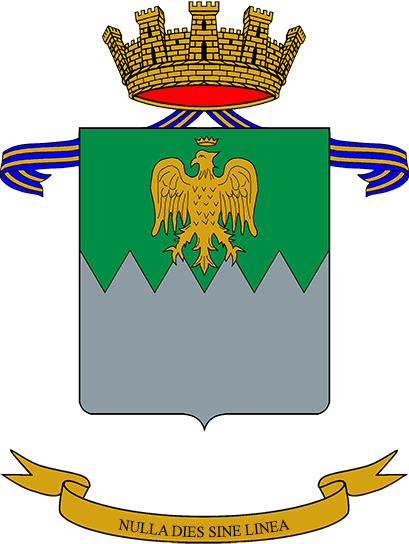
- Battalion coat of arms
- Active: 1 May 1976 – 29 Jan. 2002
- Country: Italy
- Branch: Italian Army
- Type: Military logistics
- Part of: Alpine Brigade "Julia"
- Garrison/HQ: Vacile
- Motto(s): "Nulla dies sine linea"
- Anniversaries: 22 May 1916 – Battle of Asiago
- Decorations: 2× Silver Medals of Army Valor; 1× Bronze Cross of Army Merit

Insignia
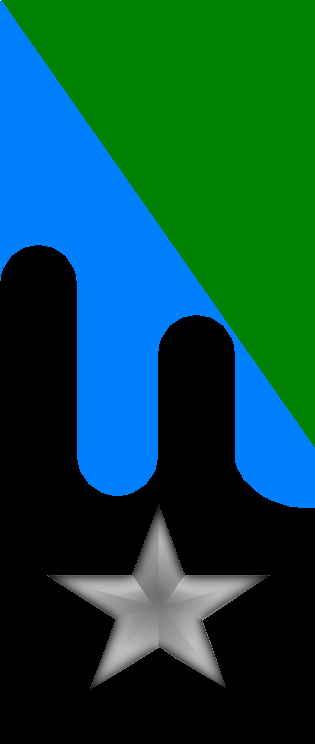
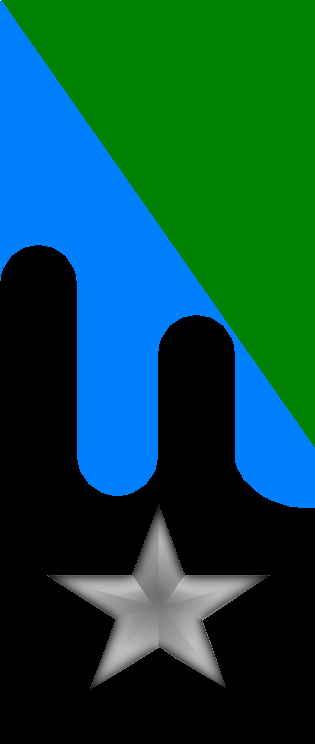
- Unit gorget patches

The Logistic Battalion "Julia" (Italian: Battaglione Logistico "Julia") is an inactive military logistics battalion of the Italian Army, which was assigned to the Alpine Brigade "Julia". As an alpine unit the battalion is associated with the army's mountain infantry speciality, the Alpini, with whom the battalion shares the distinctive Cappello Alpino. The battalion's anniversary falls, as for all units of the Italian Army's Transport and Materiel Corps, on 22 May, the anniversary of the Royal Italian Army's first major use of automobiles to transport reinforcements to the Asiago plateau to counter the Austro-Hungarian Asiago Offensive in May 1916.

== History ==
=== Cold War ===
The battalion is the spiritual successor of the logistic units of the 3rd Alpine Division "Julia", which had fought in the Greco-Italian War and the Italian campaign in the Soviet Union of World War II, and of the logistic units of the Alpine Brigade "Julia", which was formed on 15 October 1949 in Cividale del Friuli.

On 1 September 1956, the Service Units Command "Julia" was formed in Udine, which consisted of the 58th Medical Section, the 58th Provisions Section, a mobile vehicle park, a mobile workshop, and an auto unit. At a later date the command also received the 108th Field Hospital. On 1 November 1961, the mobile vehicle park and mobile workshop merged to form the Resupply, Repairs, Recovery Unit "Julia".

On 1 January 1967, the Service Units Command "Julia" was reorganized as Services Grouping Command "Julia", which consisted of a command, the Auto Unit "Julia", the 58th Provisions Company, the Resupply, Repairs, Recovery Unit "Julia", the 58th Medical Section and the 108th Field Hospital. On 1 November 1971, the grouping received a veterinary unit. In 1973, the 58th Medical Section and 108th Field Hospital entered the newly formed Medical Battalion "Julia".

On 1 May 1976, as part of the 1975 army reform, the Services Grouping Command "Julia" was reorganized as Logistic Battalion "Julia". Initially the battalion consisted of a command, a command and services platoon, two light logistic units, a medium logistic unit, and two reserve medical units. At the time the battalion fielded 712 men (42 officers, 92 non-commissioned officers, and 588 soldiers). On 12 November 1976, the President of the Italian Republic Giovanni Leone granted with decree 846 the battalion a flag.

For their conduct and work after the 1976 Friuli earthquake the battalion's two light logistic units were both awarded a Silver Medal of Army Valor. The two medals were affixed to the battalion's flag and added to the battalion's coat of arms.

On 3 July 1981, the two medical units merged into a single reserve medical unit. On 1 November 1981, the battalion was reorganized and consisted afterwards of the following units:

- Logistic Battalion "Julia", in Udine
  - Command and Services Company
  - Supply Company
  - Maintenance Company
  - Medium Transport Company
  - Medical Unit (Reserve)

=== Recent times ===
In 1991, the battalion moved from Udine to Vacile. From November 1993 to April 1994, the battalion participated in the United Nations Operation in Mozambique in Mozambique. For its conduct and work in Mozambique the battalion was awarded a Bronze Cross of Army Merit, which was affixed to the battalion's flag.

On 29 January 2002, the Logistic Battalion "Julia" was disbanded and the battalion's flag was transferred to the Shrine of the Flags in the Vittoriano in Rome for safekeeping.

== See also ==
- Military logistics
