= Novaya Kalitva =

Novaya Kalitva Новая Калитва
- Selo
- Location within Voronezh Oblast Location within Russia
- Coordinates: 50°04′N 40°00′E
- Country: Russia
- Region: Voronezh Oblast
- District: Rossoshansky District
- Time zone: UTC+3:00

Novaya Kalitva (Russian: Новая Калитва) is a rural locality (a selo) and the administrative center of Novokalitvenskoye Rural Settlement, Rossoshansky District, Voronezh Oblast, Russia. The population was 2,325 as of 2010. There are 47 streets.

== Geography ==
Novaya Kalitva is located 42 km southeast of Rossosh (the district's administrative centre) by road. Ivanovka is the nearest rural locality.
