= Pal Piccolo =

Mountain in Italy

Coordinates: 46°36′22″N 12°57′29″E

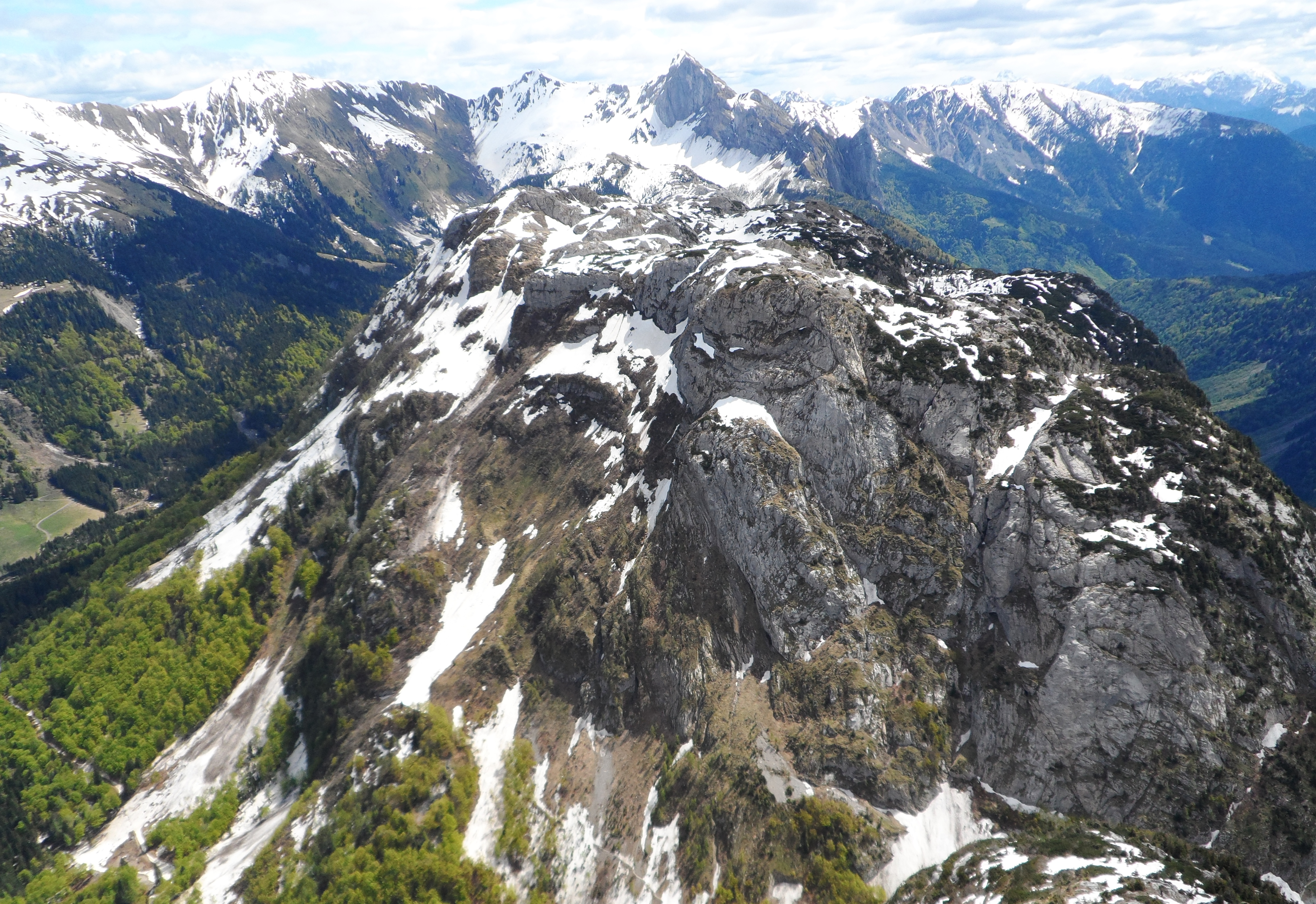

Highest point
- Elevation: 1,866 m (6,122 ft)

Geography
- Location: Friuli-Venezia Giulia, Italy/Carinthia, Austria
- Parent range: Carnic Alps

The Pal Piccolo (German: Kleiner Pal, Friulian: Pal Piçul) is a mountain in the Carnic Alps, located near Plöcken Pass, on the border between the Italian region of Friuli-Venezia Giulia and the Austrian state of Carinthia. It has an elevation of 1,866 metres.

Due to its position, the Pal Piccolo was heavily contested between Italy and Austria-Hungary during the First World War, from May 1915 to October 1917; the trenches and fortifications that litter the mountain to this day, along with two chapels built by the Alpini, are now part of an open-air museum.
