= Tolmezzo =

Tolmezzo Tumieç (Friulian)
- Comune
- Città di Tolmezzo
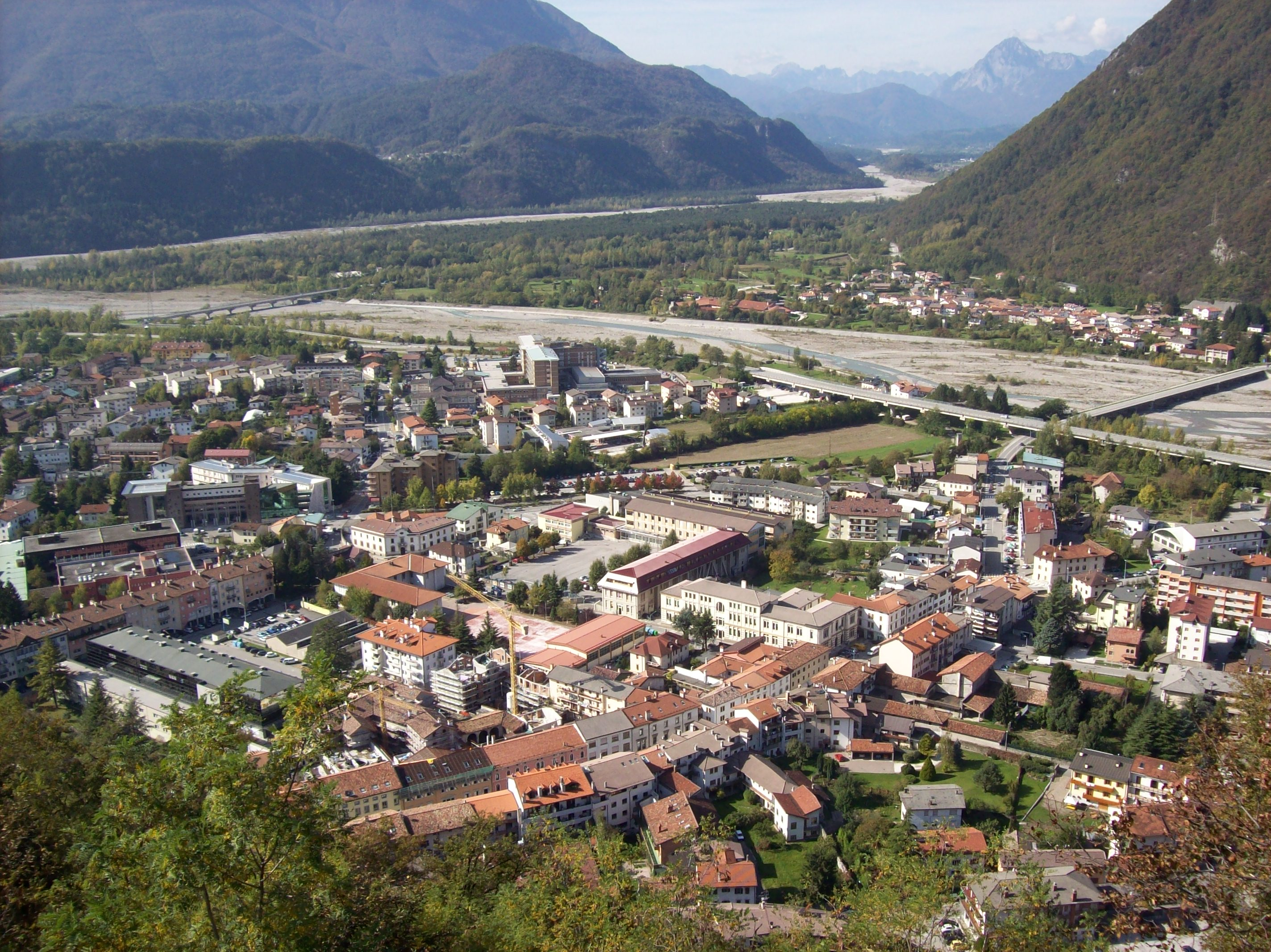

- Flag Coat of arms

- Location within Italy Location within Friuli-Venezia Giulia
- Coordinates: 46°24′N 13°01′E
- Country: Italy
- Region: Friuli-Venezia Giulia
- Province: Udine (UD)
- Frazioni: Cadunea, Caneva, Casanova, Cazzaso, Fusea, Illegio, Imponzo, Terzo, Lorenzaso

Government
  - Mayor: Francesco Brollo

Area
  - Total: 65 km^{2} (25 sq mi)
- Elevation: 323 m (1,060 ft)

Population (31 December 2004)
  - Total: 10,541
  - Density: 160/km^{2} (420/sq mi)
- Demonym: Tolmezzini
- Time zone: UTC+1 (CET)
  - Summer (DST): UTC+2 (CEST)
- Postal code: 33028
- Dialing code: 0433
- ISTAT code: 030121
- Patron saint: Saint Martin
- Saint day: November 11
- Website: Official website

Tolmezzo (Friulian: Tumieç; Slovene: Tolmeč; archaic German: Tolmein or Schönfeld) is a town and comune (municipality) in the Regional decentralization entity of Udine, part of the autonomous Friuli-Venezia Giulia region of north-eastern Italy.

== Geography ==
Tolmezzo is located at the foot of the Strabut Mountain, between the Tagliamento River and the Bût stream. Nearby is the Mount Amariana, elevation 1,906 metres (6,253 ft). The comune also includes the five frazioni (boroughs) of Cadunea (Friulian: Cjadugnee), Caneva (Cjanive), Casanova (Cjasegnove), Fusea (Fusee), Illegio (Dieç), Imponzo (Dimponç).

== History ==
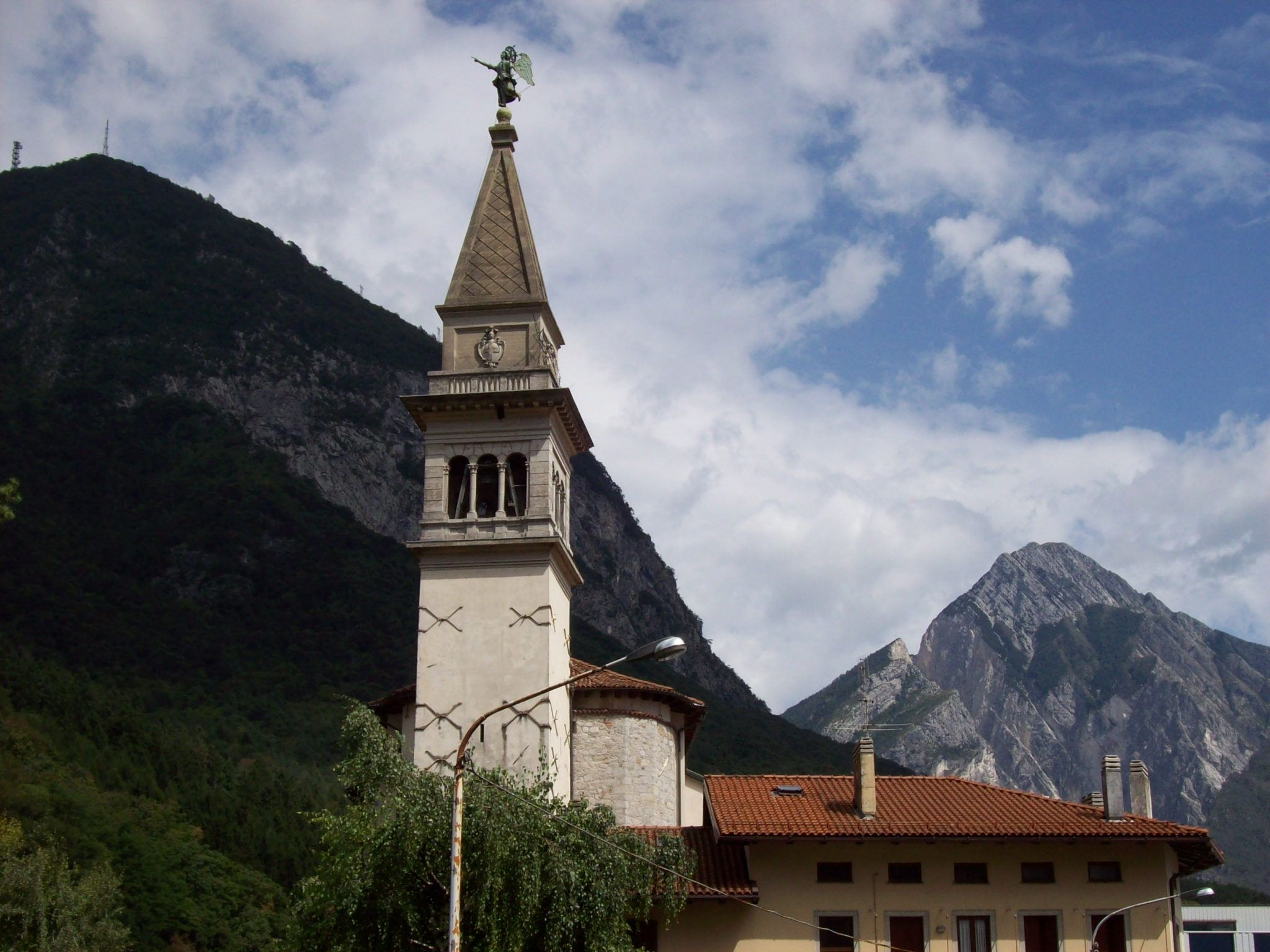
Campanile of the Duomo.

The existence of Tolmezzo (called Tolmetium) is first documented in the late 10th century, when it was part of the Patriarchate of Aquileia, but it has been suggested that the town stemmed from a very ancient pre-Roman settlement. In Roman times, the area was crossed by one of the main Roman roads that connected Italy to what is now Austria.

The city had a flourishing market and was defended by a line of walls with 18 towers and by the castle of the Patriarchs. In 1420, it was annexed to the Republic of Venice, but its trades and industries did not suffer from the change, and the city maintained its privileges. In 1797, by the Treaty of Campo Formio, it was handed over to the Austrian Empire, and after a short Napoleonic rule, it was included in the client Kingdom of Lombardy–Venetia.

Tolmezzo became part of the newly-unified Kingdom of Italy in 1866.

== Main sights ==
- The Duomo (cathedral)
- Palazzo Campeis (late 18th century): Museum
