= Mario Girotti (general) =

Italian Alpini general

- Born: 2 September 1885; Turin, Kingdom of Italy
- Died: 3 November 1957 (aged 72); Rome, Italy
- Military career
- Allegiance: Kingdom of Italy
- Branch: Royal Italian Army
- Rank: Lieutenant General
- Commands: "Susa" Alpini Battalion; 74th Infantry Regiment "Lombardia"; 4th Alpini Regiment; 9th Alpini Regiment "Levanna" Alpini Groupment; 3rd Alpine Division Julia; 6th Alpine Division Alpi Graie
- Conflicts: First Italo-Senussi War; World War I; White War; First Battle of Monte Grappa; World War II; Battle of the Western Alps; Greco-Italian War; Battle of Pindus; Battle of Klisura Pass; Italian occupation of Montenegro
- Awards: Silver Medal of Military Valor (three times); Bronze Medal of Military Valor; Military Order of Italy

Mario Girotti (2 September 1885 – 3 November 1957) was an Italian Alpini general during World War II.

== Biography ==
He was born in Turin on 2 September 1885, the son of Luigi Girotti and Cristina Lussiatti. After becoming officer on September 14, 1906, he served in Libya in 1914 and then took part in the First World War with the rank of captain and later major, earning a silver (for an action in the Carnic Alps in June 1916) and a bronze medal for military valor (for his behaviour during the First Battle of Monte Grappa in December 1917). From December 1918 to April 1919, as major in the "Monte Antelao" Alpini Battalion, he worked on the restoration of the embankments of the Piave river. In 1922 he became commander of the "Susa" Alpini Battalion, then of the 74th Infantry Regiment "Lombardia" and later of the 4th Alpini Regiment.

In January 1931 he was promoted to colonel and appointed Head of Office at the Inspectorate of Alpine Troops, replacing Colonel Vincenzo Paolini, a post he held until 1939. He was promoted to brigadier general and on 10 June 1940, following Italy's entry into World War II, he assumed command of the "Levanna" Alpini Groupment, composed of three Alpini battalions and deployed in the Orco-Baltea-Stura sector during the attack on France. In September 1940 he assumed command of the 3rd Alpine Division Julia, which he led in the bitter fighting in the mountains of the Epirus during the Greco-Italian War, participating in the battle of Pindus and in the battle of Klisura Pass between October 1940 and January 1941. At the start of the campaign the Julia Division spearheaded the Italian advance into Greece, but was surrounded and cut off by the Greek counterattack in the battle of the Pindus; Girotti managed to break the encirclement and save most of the division from certain destruction, and for this on February 15 he was promoted to the rank of major general for war merit. In late February the division repelled a Greek offensive aimed at capturing Tepelenë, for which Girotti was awarded a Silver medal for military valor.

On 15 November of the same year he assumed command of the newly established 6th Alpine Division Alpi Graie, which starting from March 1942 was transferred to Yugoslavia and employed in anti-partisan operations between Danilovgrad (where the divisional headquarters were established) and Podgorica and in the Nikšić area of Montenegro; for his leadership during these operations Girotti was awarded the Knight's Cross of the Military Order of Savoy. He was later included by Yugoslavia in the CROWCASS list of wanted criminals for war crimes committed by his troops in Montenegro. The division was repatriated in January 1943 and redeployed in southern Liguria, with the task of defending the naval base of La Spezia, and on 15 August 1943 Girotti was replaced by General Mario Gorlier and was assigned to the Ministry of War in Rome, where he was at the time of the proclamation of the armistice of Cassibile on 8 September.

Having joined the Clandestine Military Front following the German occupation of Rome, Girotti carried out Resistance activities until he was arrested by the Nazis, imprisoned and finally sentenced to death by firing squad after being harshly and fruitlessly interrogated, but Rome was liberated before the sentence could be carried out. He was, thus, freed and on 17 July 1944 he was made commander of the Clandestine Front Department of the Royal Italian Army, tasked with collecting and studying the material relating to the activities of the Clandestine Military Front during the German occupation of Rome. On 21 February 1945 he drafted a document entitled Summary of the activities of the Clandestine Front Department. For his Resistance activities during the occupation of Rome, he was awarded another Silver medal of military valor.

He was later transferred to the Army reserve and held various associative positions, including that of Vice-President of the National Union of Retired Officers of Italy, enrolling in the Roman section of the National Alpini Association, and collaborating with numerous magazines. He died in Rome on November 3, 1957, and his funeral was attended by Marshal of Italy Giovanni Messe, while a battalion of the 4th Alpini Regiment rendered the military honors during the burial.
