= Corale Alpina Savonese =

Italian a cappella chorus

- Also known as: CAS
- Origin: Savona, Italy
- Genres: Choral, popular, a cappella, Alpini songs
- Occupation: Men's Choir
- Instrument: 30 voices
- Years active: 1949-present
- Website: Official website

The Corale Alpina Savonese (CAS) is an Italian all-men a cappella chorus from Savona (Italy). Since 1987 it is directed by Eugenio Alipede.

== History ==
The Corale Alpina Savonese was founded in November 1949 by a group of university students, very fond of popular music typical of northern Italian area, surrounded by mountains. Since 1951 the group has been exhibiting in public, at first locally and then later both in Italy and abroad.

It received high scores in several national musical competitions for popular music.

Exhibitions abroad began in 1969, in France, at Grenoble and at the Castle of Lesdiguières, in Vizille. From 1983 to nowadays the choir performed six times (in 1983, 1988, 1989, 1993, 1997 and 2002) at Villingen-Schwenningen (in the Black Forest, Germany), twin town of Savona. In 1985 it held some concerts at Reutlingen (Germany). In May 2006 the group sang in the Cathedral of Orange (France), guests of the choir La Clè de Chants.

Since 1978 the Corale Alpina Savonese have organised important choir festivals in the theatre “Gabriello Chiabrera” in Savona; several well-known Italian choirs have performed in this musical event in the past, including I Crodaioli of Bepi de Marzi, author of several famous popular and traditional Italian songs like Signore delle cime, translated in several languages, and the choir of Alpine Brigade Taurinense.

The group sang in several national and international musical events. Lastly it performed during the international festival “Singen in den Bergen” at Wolfsberg (Austria) in 2003, twice, in 2005 then again in 2006, at the ”International Choir Festival” in Puster Valley, a prestigious international event with choirs from all over the world.

There are two particularly important concerts to mention: in 1960, at Imperia, in honour of Achille Compagnoni, the Italian conqueror of K2, and in 1972, at Savona, on board Impavido class destroyer Intrepido, of the Italian Navy, during the ceremony for assignment of battle ensign.

The Corale Alpina Savonese is associated to Feniarco (Federazione Nazionale delle Associazioni Corali Regionali, Italian for National Federation of the Regional Choral Associations).

== Repertoire ==
The repertoire ranges over from Alpini songs to spirituals, from typical Italian popular/traditional music to sacred music and to songs, some of them almost unknown, of the tradition of Liguria.

== Discography ==
Discography presently includes two records, available in vinyl and CD:

1996 - CD - Corale Alpina Savonese
1981 – vinyl LP - Da i munti au mä (local dialect for "From the Mountains to the Sea", typical landscape of Liguria)

Presently the group is recording several songs for a new record collection, which will be available by the end of (2008).

== Publications ==
1999 – Dal 1949 – 50 anni di storia – Book for celebrating the 50th anniversary of the choir’s foundation, in Italian
1989 - Una dinastia di…..40 – La Corale Alpina Savonese 1949-1989, in Italian

== See also ==
- Savona
- Province of Savona
- Liguria
