= Veci =

Veci is the nickname of the members on extended leave (Italian: in congedo) of the Alpini, a mountain infantry corps of the Italian Army, which distinguished itself in combat during World War I and World War II. "Veci" means "old ones" in the Venetian language; the word has no offensive meaning and, instead, is an affectionate and very respectful way of calling elderly people in that zone of Italy. Thus the meaning of "veterans" among the Alpini.

The Alpini have a very strong group identity, as they were recruited for over a hundred years locally from the people living in the valleys of the Italian Alps. This meant that every man from a village had served with all the other men - be it the younger or older - in his village in the same company of the same battalion of the same regiment and thus shared a common tradition. Therefore, even as veterans every Alpino would keep on showing his belonging to the Alpini by becoming a member of the ANA (Associazione Nazionale Alpini or National Alpini Association), which defines itself a quick reaction reserve corps to the active Alpini units. Because of this constant readiness of its members the ANA has been nicknamed 10th Alpini Regiment. Accordingly, the Italian Army never had a 10th Alpini Regiment.

The "Veci" refer to themselves as Alpini in congedo (Alpini on leave) to emphasize their readiness to return to serve if the need arises. The ANA is well organized and sections can be found in every town and village of Italy (of course mainly in the northern regions), as well as in most countries of the world. Most sections have an Alpini choir, as the Alpini songs are a much loved Italian heritage.
