= Alpini songs =

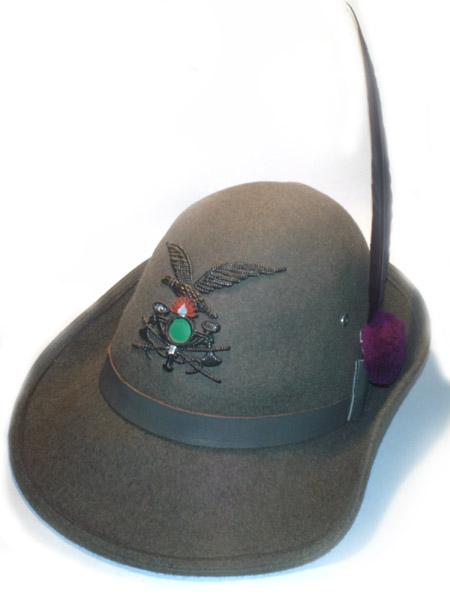
The traditional hat of the Alpini with the black feather

The Alpini are a mountain infantry corps of the Italian Army, that distinguished itself in combat during World War I and World War II. They are also famous in Italy for their songs and choirs.

The first Alpini units were formed in 1872 by recruiting soldiers among the inhabitants of the valleys of Italy’s northern mountain regions. During World War I the Alpinis saw heavy combat all over the alpine arch. The war has become known as the "War in snow and ice", as most of the 600 km frontline ran through the highest mountains and glaciers of the Alps and every position was occupied around the whole year. It was during these years that the Alpini, their spirit and their mules became legend, although at the cost of over 12,000 deaths out of a total of 40,000 mobilized Alpinis.

During this time many songs originated within the Alpini corps that tell of the hardships and brutality of this conflict. After World War I former members (called: "Veci") founded choirs in their hometowns and offered thus the Italian people a glimpse into the hardships of the "War in Snow and Ice".

Some of the most famous and well known Alpini songs are:

- Aprite le Porte

An upbeat choral calling on people to open their doors and have look at a column of advancing Alpini.

- Bersagliere Ha Cento Penne

This song begins by telling the difference between the single, long black feather which distinguishes the Alpini's service caps from the Bersaglieri's, who have a lot of smaller feathers on their cap (despite the fact they are an older formation than the Alpini). It goes on to tell why being an Alpino is harder than any other soldier's job, and says that the Alpini don't fear death because they die among the flowers of the Alps. Features the rivalry between the two elite corps of the Italian army in their first decades.

- Cosa Fai, Mio Bel Gin Gin

This song tells the story of a wife, who awaits the return of her husband, but is told by retreating Alpini, that her wait is in vain.

- Di qua, di là del Piave

A song about a beautiful girl.

- E Cadorna Manda A Dire

General Cadorna calls on the Alpini to advance and guard the frontier heights, even at the cost of the loss of their comrades.

- Era Una Notte Che Pioveva

A single soldier stands guard in the middle of a snowstorm on a mountain summit, dreaming of his beloved at home.

- Il Testamento Del Capitano

The Captain of a Company is mortally wounded and asks to see the rest of his Alpini a last time; they come, even though they have no shoes to walk. He asks them to cut his heart into five pieces: one for his homeland Italy, one for the battalion, one for his mother, one for his love and the last one for the mountains, which will surround it with roses and flowers.

- La Montanara

A song about the beauty of the Alps, very famous and often considered as the hymn of the Alps.

- La Si Taglia I Biondi Capelli

A young girl cut off her blonde hair to enlist in the army and thus able to follow her first love to the front on the Piave river.

- La Tradotta

This song is about the experiences of many of the young Alpini who died just weeks or days after deployment to the mountains via railway transports, hence the title, as it states "“The railway that begins in Turin, doesn’t stop in Milan anymore,..." The song is from the viewpoint of one who states of the many war dead of his battalion who perished in the First Battle of Monte Grappa.

- La Valsugana

The dream of returning home.

- Lassù in montagna

A inspirational song about that even when alone in the mountains all of Italy stands besides the Alpini.

- Monte Canino

The Alpini arrive on the front after days of transport in freight wagons via railway.

- Monte Cauriol

The wind brings the news to a family that their son has died on Monte Cauriol.

- Monte Nero

The 3rd Alpini regiment is on its way to conquer Mount “Nero”, but the attacks ends in such a massacre, that the regiment's colonel sits amid his dead soldiers and weeps.

- Monte Pasubio

A long column of Alpini is on the way to Mount “Pasubio” to fight the Austro-Hungarian forces, however many of them would die in its heights in the snowy landscape, amidst gunfire and artillery shelling. But the Alpinis are not afraid; they will not return/ turn around. (In Italian the used verb has this double meaning)

- Quel Mazzolin Di Fiori

A young woman collects flowers she will bring to her love.

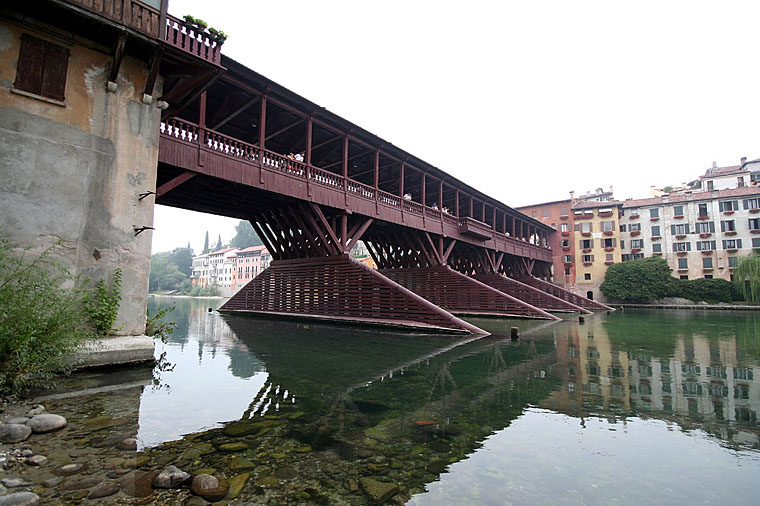
Bridge of the Alpini

- Signore delle cime

A prayer for a man who died in the mountains. It prays God to let him climb the mountains of Paradise - this famous song is a recent song (1958) written by Bepi de Marzi, an italian composer who wrote many songs drawing inspiration from popular tradition.

- Stelutis Alpinis

In Friulian. A dead soldier tells his beloved where he is buried: "up among the rocks" under a clearing full of edelweiss. He tells her to come and pick one flower, and hold it when she prays for him, so he will still be with her.

- Sul Cappello Che Noi Portiamo

A hymn on the black feather that the Alpini carry on their service grey hat.

- Sul Ponte Di Bassano

On the famous "Bridge of the Alpini" in Bassano del Grappa the Alpini say goodbye to their loved ones, before departing to the nearby front.

- Sul Ponte Di Perati

On the bridge of Perati a black flag of grief flies for the Alpini fallen of the Alpine Division Julia of the Second World War era, honoring not just their predecessors who perished in the mountains in the First World War, but also the division's war dead in Albania, Greece and the Eastern Front, their sacrifices making it one of the country's most decorated.

- Ta - Pum!

After 20 days on Mount Ortigara, a battalion of Alpini is almost wiped out and has almost no soldiers left; many of the fallen are buried in the cemetery by the river, where the battalion's remaining soldiers will soon pay visit.

== See also ==
- Stelutis Alpinis (in Italian)
- Signore Delle Cime (in Italian)
