= Mario Gorlier =

Italian general

- Gorlier as a captain during World War I
- Born: 11 February 1892; Nizza Monferrato, Kingdom of Italy
- Died: 18 July 1956 (aged 64)
- Military career
- Allegiance: Kingdom of Italy
- Branch: Royal Italian Army
- Rank: Major General
- Commands: 2nd Alpini Regiment; 6th Alpine Division "Alpi Graie"
- Conflicts: World War I; Battles of the Isonzo; World War II; Greco-Italian War; Allied invasion of Sicily; Operation Achse
- Awards: Silver Medal of Military Valor (twice); Bronze Medal of Military Valor; Military Order of Italy; Order of Saints Maurice and Lazarus; Order of Merit of the Italian Republic

Mario Gorlier (Nizza Monferrato, 11 February 1892 – 18 July 1956) was an Italian general during World War II.

== Biography ==
Born in Piedmont, he entered the Royal Military Academy of Modena at age sixteen in 1908, graduating as infantry second lieutenant, he was assigned to the Alpini corps on 19 May 1912. He fought in the First World War with the 3rd Alpini Regiment, participating in the conquest of Mount Krn and earning two Silver and one Bronze Medal of Military Valor. After promotion to lieutenant colonel on 1 December 1926, he was assigned to the general staff; on 16 March 1936, he was promoted to the rank of colonel and given command of the 2nd Alpini Regiment, and from 8 September 1939, he was transferred to the command of the Motorized Army Corps for special assignments, as a trusted collaborator of General Giovanni Messe.

Following the entry of the Kingdom of Italy into the Second World War on 10 June 1940, Gorlier was promoted to brigadier general and assigned to the command of the Special Army Corps (later XXX Army Corps) in Albania, together with Messe, participating in the campaign against Greece. On 10 July 1941, he became head of the 1st department at the staff officer corps in Rome (later head of the operations office at the Comando Supremo), a post he held until 5 July 1943. On 2 March 1942, he was awarded the honor of knight of the Military Order of Italy and with the Royal Decree of 8 August 1942 he was appointed officer of the Order of Saints Maurice and Lazarus. Having been promoted to major general on 1 January 1943, in July 1943, after the Allied landings in Sicily, he was sent to Sicily as an envoy of General Mario Roatta to the headquarters of General Alfredo Guzzoni, commander of the Sixth Army, later taking on the task of organizing a defensive line on the mountains of Cefalù. On 15 August 1943, he was appointed commander of the 6th Alpine Division "Alpi Graie", stationed in Liguria. After the armistice of Cassibile in September 1943, his troops defended La Spezia and delayed the German forces enough to allow the Italian fleet to set sail for Malta; he then evaded capture by the Germans and lived in hiding until the end of the war.

On the proposal of the Presidency of the Council of Ministers, on 2 June 1956 he was awarded as Grand Officer of the Order of Merit of the Italian Republic, just a month before his death.
