= 6th Alpine Division "Alpi Graie" =

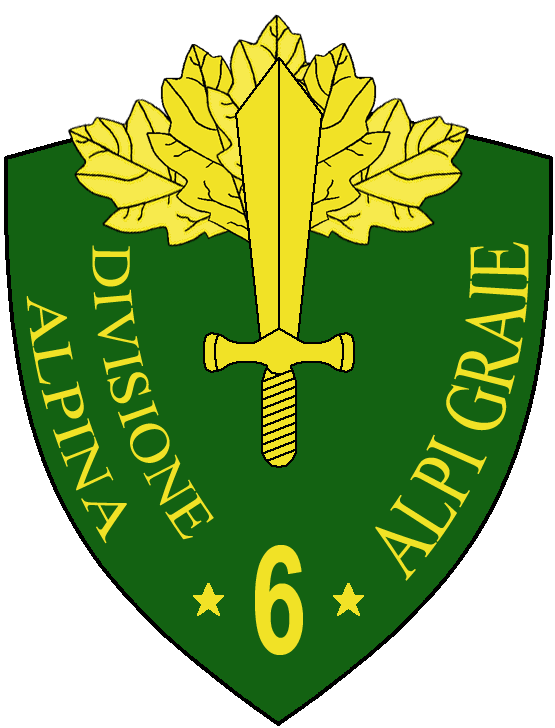
- 6th Alpine Division "Alpi Graie" insignia
- Active: 15 November 1941 - 10 September 1943
- Country: Kingdom of Italy
- Branch: Royal Italian Army
- Type: Alpini
- Role: Mountain Infantry
- Garrison/HQ: Ivrea
- Engagements: World War II

Insignia
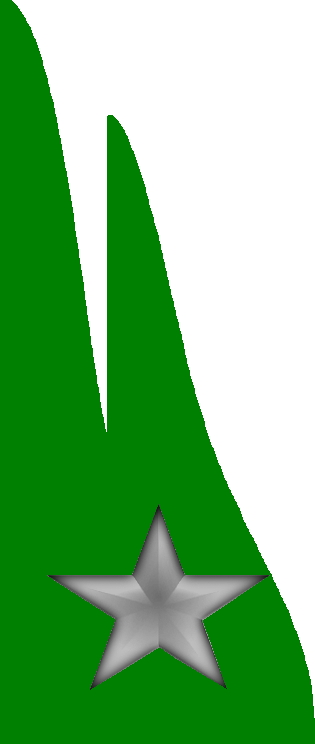
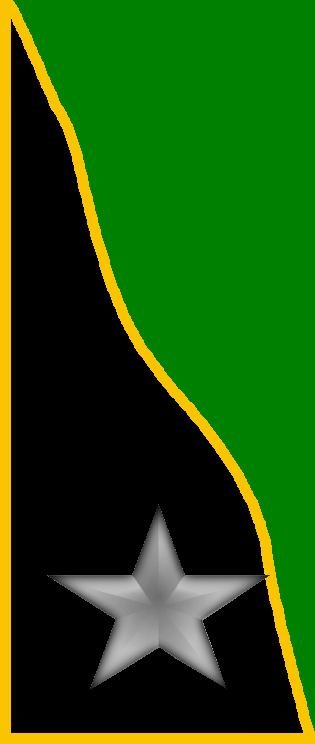
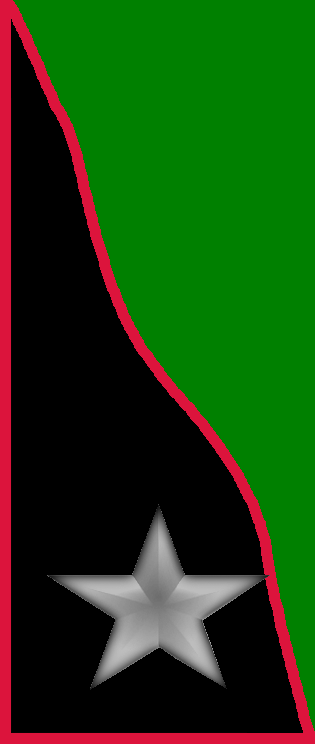
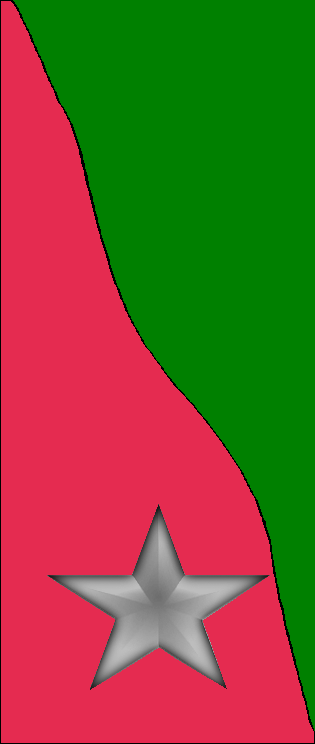
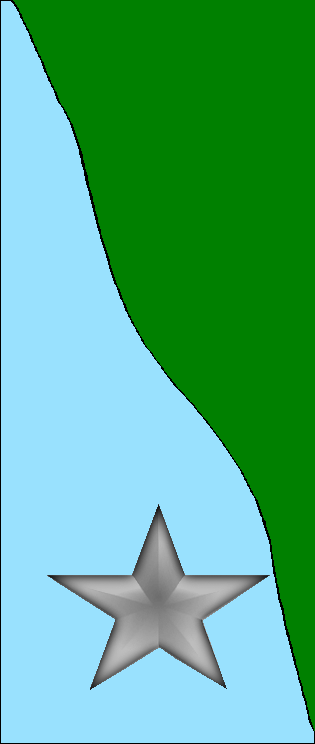
- Identification symbol: Alpi Graie Division gorget patches

The 6th Alpine Division "Alpi Graie" (Italian: 6ª Divisione alpina "Alpi Graie") was a short-lived division of the Royal Italian Army during World War II, which specialized in mountain warfare. The Alpini that formed the division are a highly decorated, elite mountain corps of the Italian Army comprising both infantry and artillery units. The divisions name Alpi Graie was chosen as most of its recruits came from the area of the Graian Alps (Italian: Alpi Graie).

== History ==
The division was raised in Ivrea on 15 November 1941 by activating reserve units. The division was deployed quickly to Montenegro - the first unit to leave was the 4th Alpini "Valley" Group on 14 December 1941. In March 1942 the full division had arrived at Danilovgrad in Montenegro and began to fight Yugoslav Partisans. The division saw heavy combat in the area of the Durmitor massif.

Meanwhile, the 3rd Alpini "Valley" Group had taken up garrison duties in occupied France in the area of Maurienne. It participated in the occupation of Vichy France by Axis forces during Case Anton.

In January 1943 the division was moved to Liguria for coastal defense duties. In the first days of September 1943 the division was moved to La Spezia to guard the Royal Italian Navy's base there. After the Armistice of Cassibile was announced on 8 September 1943 the division skirmished with invading German forces of the 65th Infantry Division to allow the Italian battle fleet to leave harbor and sail to ports under allied control. After the fleet had sailed the division dissolved on 10 September and most of its troops managed to evade the Germans and make for their homes.

== Organization ==
=== Planned ===
- 6th Alpine Division "Alpi Graie", in Ivrea
  - Headquarters
    - Command Company
    - 420th Carabinieri Section
    - 422nd Carabinieri Section
    - 103rd Field Post Office
    - 6th Alpine Division Command Transport Squad
  - 3rd Alpini "Valley" Group
    - Alpini Battalion "Val Pellice"
    - Alpini Battalion "Susa" (regular battalion, transferred from the 3rd Alpini Regiment/ 1st Alpine Division "Taurinense")
    - Alpini Battalion "Val Cenischia"
  - 4th Alpini "Valley" Group
    - Alpini Battalion "Val d’Orco"
    - Alpini Battalion "Val Chisone"
    - Alpini Battalion "Val Toce"
  - 6th Alpine Artillery Regiment
    - Alpine Artillery Group "Val d’Orco"
    - Alpine Artillery Group "Val d’Adige"
    - Alpine Artillery Group "Val Chisone"
  - XI Mixed Alpine Engineer Battalion
    - Command Platoon
    - 1 × Searchlight Section
    - 1 × Telegraph and Radio Operators Company
    - 1 × Engineer Company
  - 101st Supply Section
  - 230th Transport Section
  - 310th Medical Section

=== Montenegro 1942 ===
- 6th Alpine Division "Alpi Graie"
  - 2nd Alpini "Valley" Group
    - Alpini Battalion "Val Pescara"
    - Alpini Battalion "Val Leogra"
  - 4th Alpini "Valley" Group
    - Alpini Battalion "Val d’Orco"
    - Alpini Battalion "Val Chisone"
    - Alpini Battalion "Susa"
  - 6th Alpine Artillery Regiment
    - Alpine Artillery Group "Val d’Orco" (replaced later by the Alpine Artillery Group "Val d’Adige")
    - Alpine Artillery Group "Val Isonzo"

=== Italy spring 1943 ===
- 6th Alpine Division "Alpi Graie"
  - Headquarters
    - Command Company
    - 420th Carabinieri Section
    - 422nd Carabinieri Section
    - 103rd Field Post Office
  - 1st Alpini "Valley" Group
    - Alpini Battalion "Val Fella"
    - Alpini Battalion "Val Natisone"
    - Alpini Battalion "Val Tagliamento"
  - 4th Alpini "Valley" Group
    - Alpini Battalion "Val d’Orco"
    - Alpini Battalion "Val Chisone"
    - Alpini Battalion "Susa"
  - 6th Alpine Artillery Regiment
    - Alpine Artillery Group "Val d’Adige"
    - Alpine Artillery Group "Val Tagliamento"
  - XI Mixed Alpine Engineer Battalion
  - 101st Supply Section
  - 310th Medical Section
  - 429th Transport Section
  - 430th Transport Section

=== Italy summer 1943 ===
On 1 May 1943 the 1st Alpini "Valley" Group left the division and was used to begin the process of reforming the destroyed 3rd Alpine Division "Julia" and 4th Alpine Division "Cuneense". Therefore the 6th Alpine Division once again changed its composition.

- 6th Alpine Division "Alpi Graie"
  - 3rd Alpini "Valley" Group
    - Alpini Battalion "Val Pellice"
    - Alpini Battalion "Val Fassa"
    - Alpini Battalion "Val Dora"
  - 4th Alpini "Valley" Group
    - Alpini Battalion "Val d’Orco"
    - Alpini Battalion "Val Chisone"
    - Alpini Battalion "Susa"
  - 6th Alpine Artillery Regiment
    - Alpine Artillery Group "Val d’Adige"
    - Alpine Artillery Group "Val Chisone"
  - XI Mixed Alpine Engineer Battalion
  - 13th Transport Section
  - 313th Medical Section
  - 19th Supply Section
  - 420th Carabinieri Section
  - 422nd Carabinieri Section
  - 103rd Field Post Office

== Commanding officers ==
The division's commanding officers were:

- Generale di Divisione Mario Girotti (15 November 1941 - 14 August 1943)
- Generale di Divisione Mario Gorlier (15 August 1943 - 10 September 1943)

== CROWCASS ==
The names of two men attached to the division can be found in the Central Registry of War Criminals and Security Suspects (CROWCASS) set up by the Anglo-American Supreme Headquarters Allied Expeditionary Force in 1945. The names can be found at: Central Registry of War Criminals and Security Suspects from the Kingdom of Italy.
