= National Alpini Association =

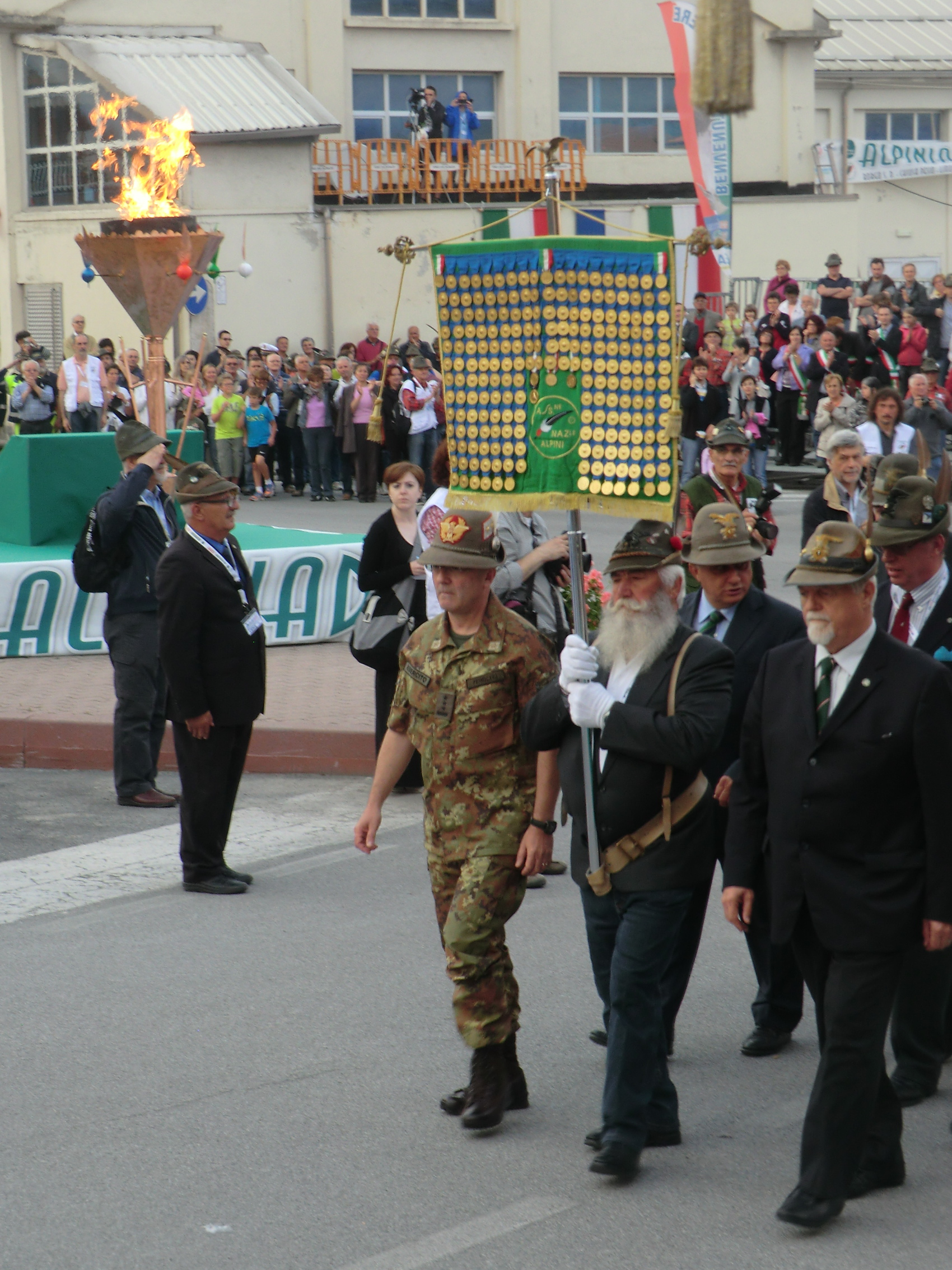
Members carrying the flag of the association.

The National Alpini Association (Italian: Associazione Nazionale Alpini) is an Italian association representing the "Alpini in congedo" (Alpini on leave) of the Italian Army. The Alpini are a mountain infantry corps of the Italian Army, that distinguished itself in combat during World War I and World War II. As the ANA defines itself as a quick reaction reserve corps to the active Alpini units, it has been nicknamed "10th Alpini Regiment" (Italian: 10° Reggimento Alpini). Accordingly, the Italian Army never had a 10th Alpini Regiment.

== Coin ==
In March 2020, San Marino issued a 10 euros commemorative coin for the "93rd national Alpini assembly Rimini".
