= Alpini =

Italian Army specialist mountain infantry

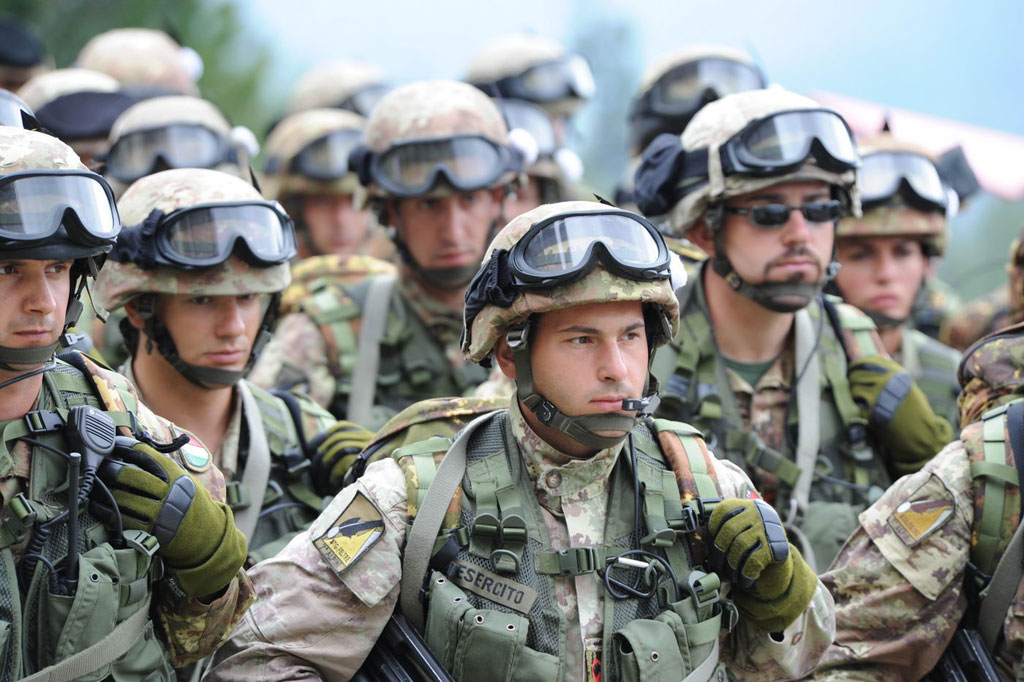
- Alpini of the 7th Alpini Regiment
- Active: 15 October 1872 – present
- Country: Italy
- Branch: Italian Army
- Type: Mountain troops
- Size: 2 brigades
- Part of: Alpine Troops Headquarters
- Nicknames: Le Penne Nere ("The Black Feathers")
- Patron: San Maurizio, celebrated every September 22nd
- Mottos: Di Qui Non Si Passa! ("From here, no one passes")
- Anniversaries: October 15th (date of foundation)
- Engagements: First Italo-Ethiopian War; Boxer Rebellion; Italo-Turkish War; World War I Second Italo-Ethiopian War; Invasion of Albania; World War II; War in Afghanistan
- Decorations: 9 Croci di Cavaliere dell'O.M.I. 16 Gold Medals of Military Valor; 22 Silver Medals of Military Valor; 5 Bronze Medals of Military Valor; 1 War Cross of Military Valor; 2 Bronze Medals of Army Valor; 1 Gold Medal of Civil Valor; 1 Bronze Medal of Civil Valor; 1 Silver Cross for Army Merit; 1 Cross for Army Merit.

Commanders
- Notable commanders: Luigi Reverberi

The Alpini are the Italian Army's specialist mountain infantry. Part of the army's infantry corps, the speciality distinguished itself in combat during World War I and World War II. Currently the active Alpini units are organized in two operational brigades, which are subordinate to the Alpine Troops Headquarters. The Alpini's name comes from their inceptive association with the Alps, the mountain range that Italy shares with France, Switzerland, Austria, and Slovenia. An individual soldier of the Alpini is called an Alpino.

Established in 1872, the Alpini are the oldest active mountain infantry in the world. Their original mission was to protect Italy's border with France and Austria-Hungary. In 1888 the Alpini deployed on their first mission abroad, in Africa, a continent to which they returned on several occasions and during various wars of the Kingdom of Italy. During World War I they fought a three-year campaign on the Alps against Austro-Hungarian Kaiserjäger and the German Alpenkorps in what has since become known as the "War in snow and ice". During World War II, the Alpini fought alongside the Axis forces primarily in the Balkans Campaigns and on the Eastern Front.

During the Cold War the Alpini formed five brigades, which during the 1990s were reduced to two.

== History ==
=== 1872 to 1887 ===
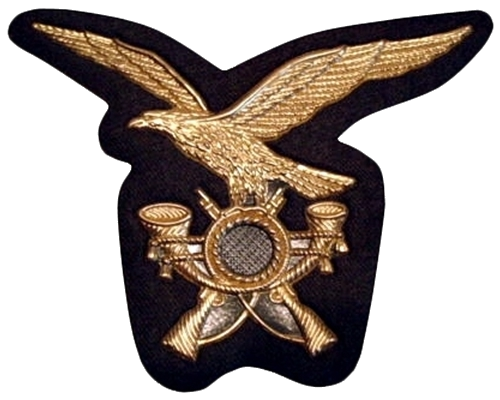
Cap insignia of Alpini.

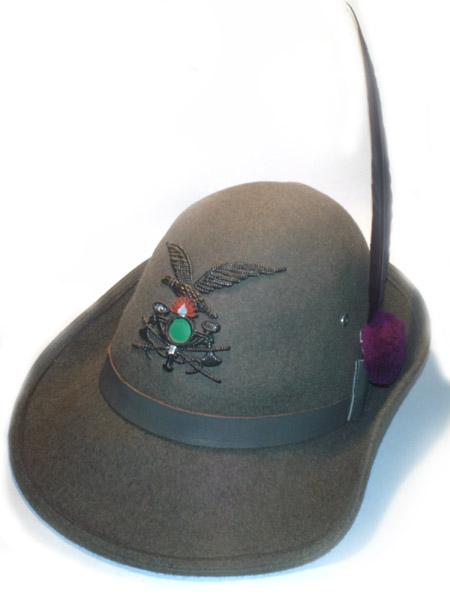
A Cappello Alpino of a Combat Engineer of the Alpini Corps: with raven feather, amaranth Nappina, (tuft) and the coat of the 2° Engineer Regiment.

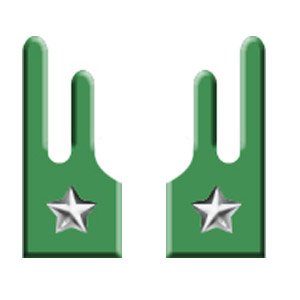
A pair of Fiamme Verdi collar patches

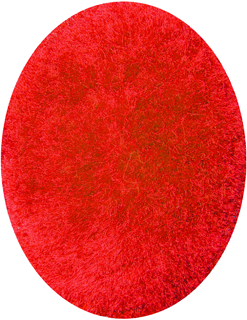
A Nappina

In 1872, Captain Giuseppe Perrucchetti published a study in the May edition of the Military Review (Italian: Rivista Militare). In the study, he proposed to assign the defence of mountain borders of the recently established Kingdom of Italy to soldiers recruited locally. Indeed, thanks to their knowledge of the surroundings and personal attachment to the area, they would be highly capable and better motivated defenders. Perrucchetti drew heavily on the work of Lieutenant General Agostino Ricci, who in 1868 had organised exercises in the mountains to assess the feasibility of a specialised mountain infantry corps. Five months after Perrucchetti's article, the first 15 Alpini companies were formed by Royal decree no. 1056, with their activation effective on October 15, 1872 - the date marked as the official Corps Day. The activation of the mountain companies thus made the Alpini the oldest active Mountain Infantry in the world.

At first the Alpini were organized as a militia, capable of defending Italy's northern mountainous borders. Austria's surrender in the Austro-Prussian War of 1866 resulted in Italy annexing the province of Venetia, the northern borders of which coincided in large part with the Alpine Arch. Prior to gaining the new northern borders, homeland defence was based on the so-called Quadrilatero strategy. That outdated strategy, however, ignored the geopolitics of the new Italian Kingdom. It called for primary defence of the Po Valley region ("Pianura Padana") farther to the southwest, but left the Alpine region undefended (as it was considered a territory mainly unsuitable for military operations).

Recruiting Italy's mountain valleys locals and organising them into a special corps was indeed an innovative idea. They possessed superior knowledge of mountain territory and greatest adaptability to Alpine conditions. At the beginning, the mountain regions were divided into seven military districts, each commanded by an Officer and home to at least two Alpini companies, each consisting of 120 personnel. Soldiers were equipped with the Vetterli 1870 rifle. In 1873 nine more companies were added, thus totalling 24. In 1875, the companies doubled in size, having 250 soldiers and 5 officers, which were then organised into 7 Alpini battalions. Each battalion was named after one of the seats of the seven military districts:

1° Cuneo, 2° Mondovi, 3° Torino (Susa), 4° Torino (Chivasso), 5° Como, 6° Treviso, 7° Udine

In 1877, five Alpini mountain artillery batteries were formed and - in the following year - the Alpini had already grown to 36 mountain infantry companies organised into 10 battalions. On November 1, 1882, the Alpini organisation doubled in size to 72 companies and a total of 20 Alpini battalions. The latter plus 8 Alpini mountain artillery batteries were now organized into six numbered Alpini regiments and two Alpini mountain artillery brigades with their respective headquarters and support formations. Each battalion was named after the area it was required to defend in case of war:

Regiment	Garrison/HQ	1st Bn.	2nd Bn.	3rd Bn.	4th Bn.
1st Alpini	Mondovì	Alto Tanaro	Val Tanaro	Val Camonica	
2nd Alpini	Bra.	Val Pesio	Col Tenda	Val Schio	
3rd Alpini	Fossano	Val Stura	Val Maira	Monti Lessini	
4th Alpini	Turin	Val Pellice	Val Chisone	Val Brenta	
5th Alpini	Milan	Val Dora	Moncenisio	Valtellina	Alta Valtellina
6th Alpini	Conegliano	Val d'Orco	Val d'Aosta	Cadore	Val Tagliamento

The numbers used earlier to distinguish the battalions were dropped while - at the same time - the companies were now numbered from 1 to 72. In order to distinguish the battalions, soldiers and non-commissioned officers were issued thread tufts of various colors (the Nappina), which were added to the Cappello Alpino: white for the First Bn., red for the Second Bn., and Green for the Third Bn. of each regiment. Special Bn. and Fourth Bn. were issued blue tufts. Soldiers of the Mountain Artillery units were issued a green tuft with a black patch in the middle onto which the number of the battery was written in yellow numbers.

On June 7, 1883, the green flames (Italian: "fiamme verdi") collar patch was introduced, thus making the Alpini officially a speciality within the Italian infantry corps. The Cappello Alpino, with its black raven feather, was also introduced at that time. The distinctive headdress quickly led the Alpini to be nicknamed "The Black feathers" (Italian: "Le Penne Nere"). Officers hats had the black feather replaced with a white eagle feather. At first, the hat was a black felt hat, but as soon as the new green-grey uniform was adopted in 1909 the hat was changed to the distinctive grey felt still in service today.

The Alpini were also distinguished by the green cuffs on the dark blue tunics worn for full dress and barrack dress until 1915, and by green piping on their light blue/grey trousers. When grey-green service uniforms were trialled by the Alpini in 1906, before being adopted by the entire army in 1909, the distinctive green collar patches and typical headdress were retained.

The materials, weapons, and equipment of each battalion were stored in the major village of a specific area they were required to defend in case of war. Soldiers of a battalion were only recruited from that area. In 1887, the names of the battalions were changed from those of the defended areas to those of local villages. Therefore, e.g., the Edolo Bn. soldiers were recruited in the vicinity of that village Edolo - where the battalion's arsenal, training ground, and officer's housing were also located. Local recruitment generated strong bonds with and self-identification between the locals and the Alpini units, as men assigned to a single company were all recruited from the same village, and the companies from one valley were all part of the same battalion.

In 1887 the Mountain Troops Inspectorate (Italian: Ispettorato delle truppe alpine) was established in Rome, and took administrative command of all Mountain troops. This led to the reorganization of the Alpini Corps: on August 1, 1887, the 7th Alpini Regiment was formed in Conegliano Veneto and assigned two battalions from the 6th regiment. The number of battalions had grown by two, thus reaching 22. On November 1, 1887, the 1st Mountain Artillery Regiment was formed in Turin with nine batteries, each equipped with four 75 mm howitzers. The resulting new layout of the Alpini Corps was as follows:

Regiment	Garrison/HQ	1st Bn.	2nd Bn.	3rd Bn.	4th Bn.
1st Alpini	Mondovì	Ceva	Pieve di Teco	Mondovì	
2nd Alpini	Brà	Borgo San Dalmazzo	Vinadio	Dronero	
3rd Alpini	Turin	Fenestrelle	Susa I	Susa II *	
4th Alpini	Ivrea	Pinerolo	Aosta	Ivrea	
5th Alpini	Milan	Morbegno	Tirano	Edolo	Rocca d'Anfo **
6th Alpini	Verona	Verona	Vicenza	Bassano	
7th Alpini	Conegliano	Feltre	Pieve di Cadore	Gemona	

* (renamed "Exilles" in 1889) ** (renamed "Vestone" in 1889)

=== 1888 to 1914 ===
Although established as a defensive mountain warfare force, the 1° Battaglione Alpini d'Africa (1st African Alpini Battalion) was established in 1887. The battalion's four companies were composed of volunteers taken from all other Alpini battalions. As part of the Corpo Speciale d'Africa (Special African Corps), the battalion deployed to Eritrea to take revenge for the lost battle of Dogali. The battalion returned on April 27, 1888, to Naples, having lost its commanding officer and 13 men due to tropical diseases.

Back in Italy, eight mules were assigned to each Alpini company in the same year. The Vetterli 70 rifle was replaced by the newer Vetterli-Vitali mod. 70/87 rifle. Also, based on a general reorganization of the Italian militia system, 38 Alpini companies and 15 mountain batteries were assigned to active units of the Regio Esercito (Royal Italian Army). In 1892 the Alpini were the first troops to be issued with the new Mod. 91 rifle, which was replaced in 1897 by the Mod. 91TS version and remained in service until 1945.

When the tensions between Italy and Abyssinia escalated into the First Italo–Abyssinian War the 1° Battaglione Alpini d'Africa was reformed and sent to Eritrea again. It would soon become the first Alpini unit to engage combat. Four batteries of the 1st Mountain Artillery Regiment were also sent to Eritrea to augment the four deployed brigades under command of Oreste Baratieri. The battalions' first engagement was on March 1, 1896, during the Battle of Adowa. The Alpini were outnumbered and heavily defeated by Abyssinian troops. Over 400 out of 530 men died, including the commanding officer, Lt.Col. Davide Menini. After the battle, the first Gold Medal for Military Valor (Italian: Medaglia d'oro al valor militare) was awarded to a member of the Alpini Corps: Capitan Pietro Cella and his Alpini from the 4th company occupied and held the Amba Rajo (English: Rajo Mountain) until March 2, thus allowing the rest of defeated Italian Army forces to flee. Capitan Cella and all his men died in the effort. In memory of their ultimate sacrifice, he has been awarded the Gold Medal for Military Valor. After such a defeat, an Alpini expeditionary regiment with 5 battalions was formed and sent to Eritrea on March 7, 1896, but it saw little combat and was repatriated in June of the same year.

During the 1900 Boxer Rebellion, a Mountain Artillery Battery was sent to China as part of the international relief force that lifted the siege of the International Compound in Beijing, and remained on garrison duty in Tianjin until the end of 1901. On November 13, 1902, after a short period of experimentation with skis the Alpini began to form specially-equipped and trained Skiing Companies (Italian: Compagnie Sciatori). After a heavy earthquake on September 8, 1905, in the Calabria region (Southern Italy), the Alpini deployed to the area for three months to assist in the clearance of debris and reconstruction efforts. They experienced a similar situation in 1908, after the devastating Messina earthquake.

A massive expansion of the Alpini begun in 1909. On July 15 the 2nd Mountain Artillery Regiment was formed in Vicenza with four artillery groups and a total of 12 batteries. In 1908, two new battalions - namely the Tolmezzo and Pallanza (later renamed as Intra in 1909) - had already been formed and assigned to the 7th and 4th regiments, respectively. On October 1, 1909, the "Tolmezzo" and "Gemona" battalions from the 7th Alpini regiment, along with the newly raised Cividale battalion, became the three battalions of new 8th Alpini Regiment, based in Udine. The first commander of the 8th Alpini regiment was Col. Antonio Cantore, who would become a living legend to the Alpini during World War I. As the 8th Alpini regiment was formed, the Alpini could now count on 25 battalions organised into 8 regiments, 2 mountain artillery regiments with 24 batteries organised into 8 groups, and 75 reserve companies organised into 22 battalions. Reserve battalions were named after the valleys from where their soldiers, former Alpini, were recruited (also known as the 'Valle' battalions).

Regiment	Garrison/HQ	1st Bn./Grp.	2nd Bn./Grp.	3rd Bn./Grp.	4th Bn./Grp.
8th Alpini	Udine	Tolmezzo	Gemona	Cividale	
1st Mountain Artillery	Turin	Oneglia	Mondovì	Torino-Susa	Torino-Aosta
2nd Mountain Artillery	Vicenza	Conegliano	Bergamo	Vicenza	Belluno

In 1910 the last pre-war Alpini battalion was established as the Belluno Bn. in the very same city.

When Italy declared war on Turkey in 1911 in an attempt to conquer Libya, the Alpini units were once again deployed on desert combat. From 1911 to 1914, the Saluzzo, Mondovì, Ivrea, Verona, Tolmezzo, Feltre, Susa, Vestone, Fenestrelle, and Edolo battalions, together with the Torino-Susa, Mondovì, and Vicenza artillery groups, were deployed to Libya on missions of different duration. The first units to be sent to Libya were the Saluzzo (25 October 1911), Mondovì (3 November 1911), Ivrea (3 November 1911) and Verona (16 December 1911) battalions. When the unexpected Turkish resistance caused an embarrassingly slow advance of the Italian forces, reinforcements were sent to Libya. On October 18, 1912 Turkey and Italy signed the Treaty of Lausanne, which ended the war between the two nations. Italy, however, had now to face a full-scale rebellion by the local population, and required more troops than those deployed in combat to suppress it. Therefore, in October 1912 the Tolmezzo, Feltre, Susa, and Vestone battalions were deployed in Zanzur, Libya, and formed the 8th Special Alpini Regiment (Italian: 8° Reggimento Alpini Speciale) under the command of Colonel Antonio Cantore. The last Alpini unit to leave Libya was the Feltre battalion. It reached Italy in August 1914, while the Bedouin rebellion in Libya continued unabated.

=== World War I ===
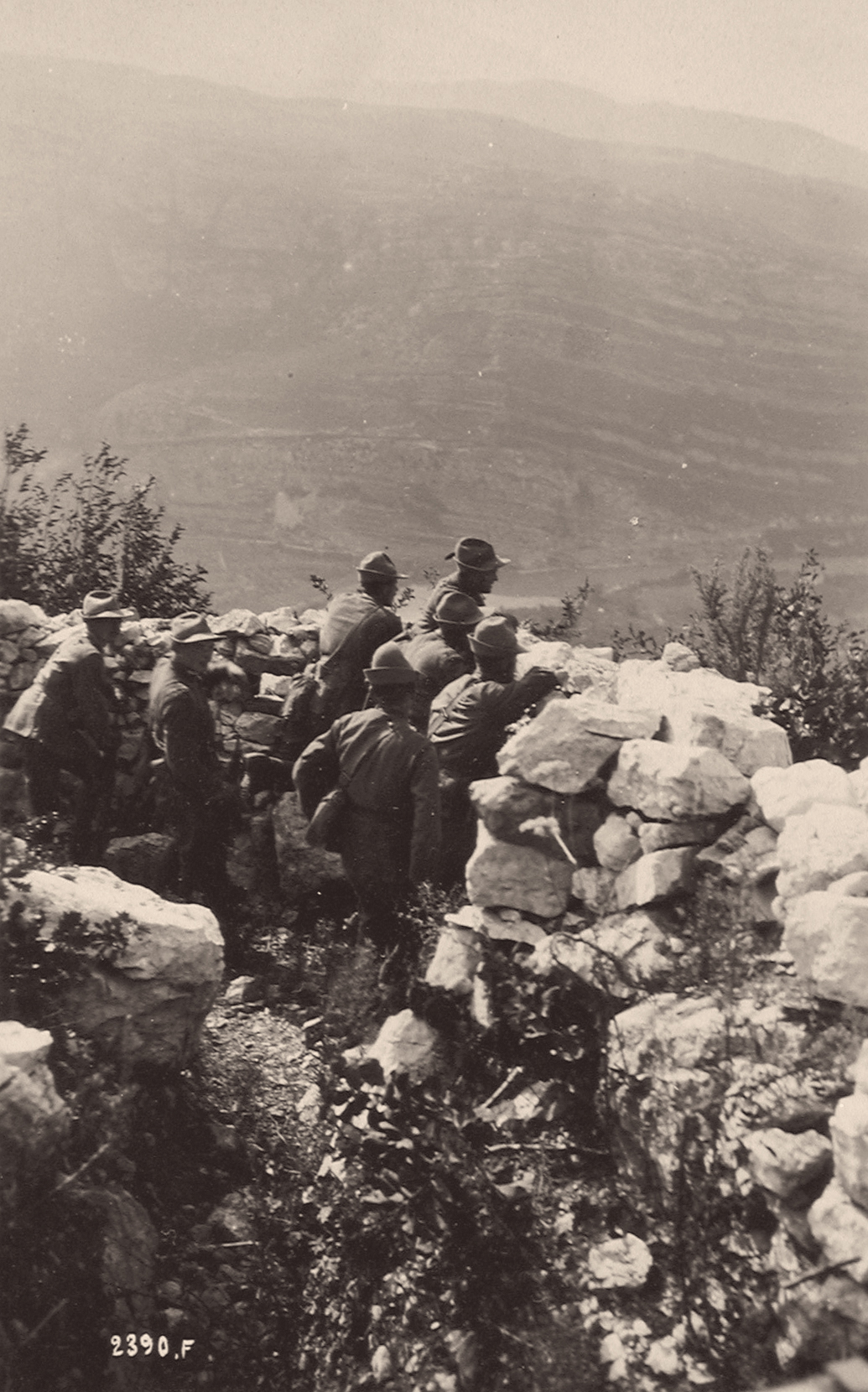
Alpini in the frontline trenches on the Monte Corno

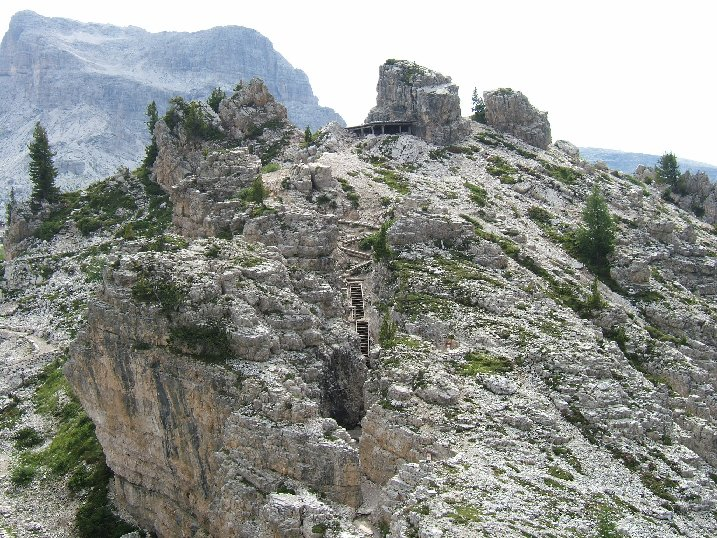
Italian positions on Cinque Torri summit today.

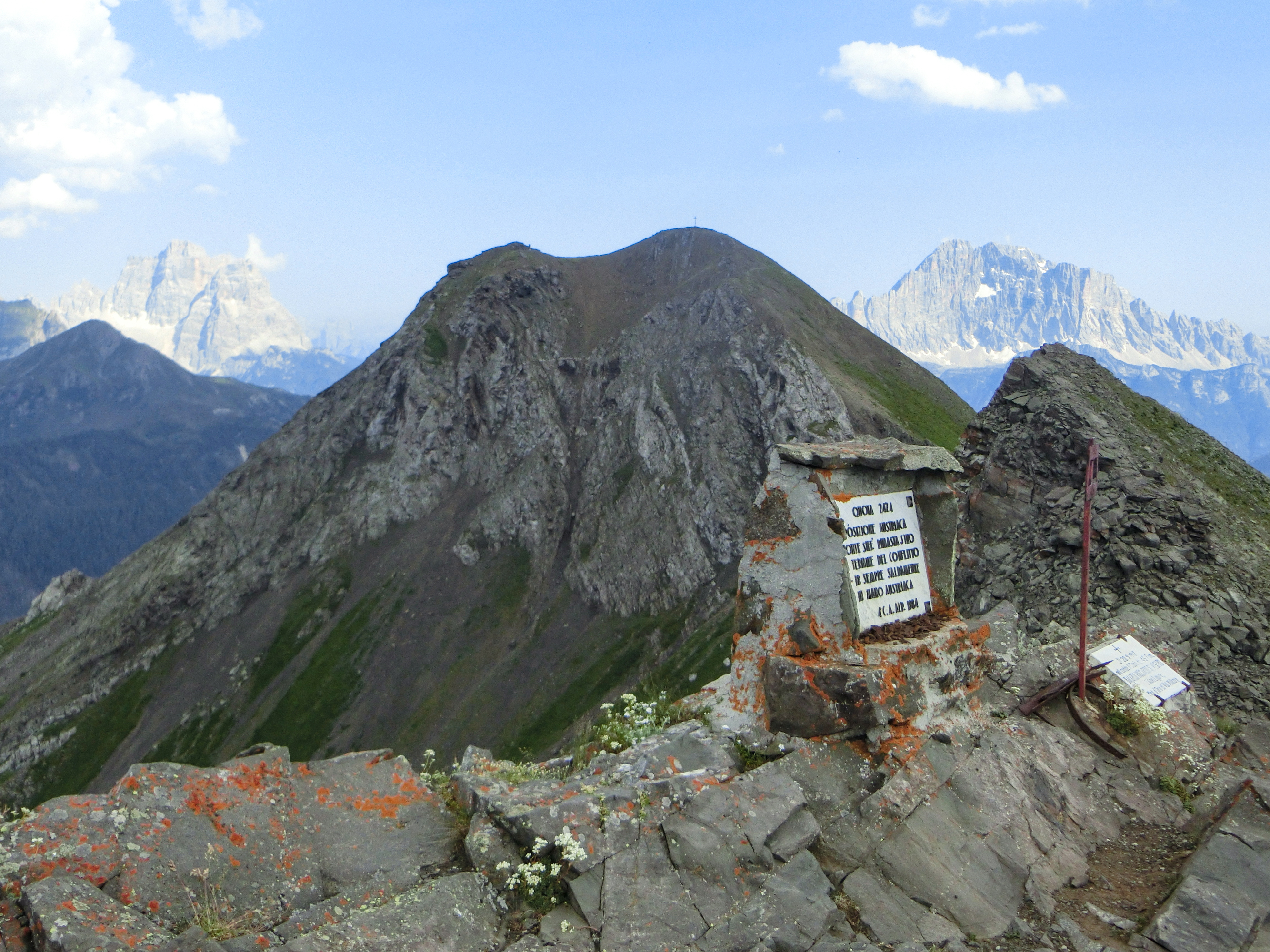
Col di Lana after the detonation of the Italian mine.

During World War I the 26 peacetime Alpini battalions were increased by 62 battalions and saw heavy combat all over the alpine arch. During the war years the Alpini regiments consisted of the following battalions (the pre-war raised battalions are in bold; their reserve battalions, named after valleys (in Italian: Val or Valle), and the newly raised battalions, named after mountains (in Italian: Monte) drawn from the same recruiting areas as the original battalions follow below the pre-war battalions):

Regiment				
1st Alpini	**Ceva**; Val Tanaro; Monte Mercantur	**Pieve di Teco**; Val Arroscia; Monte Saccarello	**Mondovì**; Val Ellero; Monte Clapier	
2nd Alpini	**Borgo San Dalmazzo**; Val Stura; Monte Argentera; Cuneo	**Dronero**; Val Maira; Bicocca	**Saluzzo**; Val Varaita; Monviso	
3rd Alpini	**Pinerolo**; Val Pellice; Monte Granero	**Fenestrelle**; Val Chisone; Monte Albergian; Courmayeur	**Exilles**; Val Dora; Monte Assietta	**Susa**; Val Cenischia; Moncenisio
4th Alpini	**Ivrea**; Val d'Orco; Monte Levanna; Pallanza	**Aosta**; Val Baltea; Monte Cervino	**Intra**; Val Toce; Monte Rosa	
5th Alpini	**Morbegno**; Val d'Intelvi; Monte Spluga; Monte Mandrone	**Tirano**; Valtellina; Monte Stelvio; Monte Tonale	**Edolo**; Val Camonica; Monte Adamello; Monte Ortler	**Vestone**; Val Chiese; Monte Suello; Monte Cavento
6th Alpini	**Verona**; Val d'Adige; Monte Baldo	**Vicenza**; Val Leogra; Monte Berico; Monte Pasubio	**Bassano**; Val Brenta; Sette Comuni	
7th Alpini	**Feltre**; Val Cismon; Monte Pavione	**Pieve di Cadore**; Val Piave; Monte Antelao	**Belluno**; Val Cordevole; Monte Pelmo; Monte Marmolada	
8th Alpini	**Tolmezzo**; Val Tagliamento; Monte Arvenis	**Gemona**; Val Fella; Monte Canin	**Cividale**; Val Natisone; Monte Matajur; Monte Nero	

The Alpini battalions fielded 264 companies of one captain, four lieutenants and 250 men each. The Alpini regiments were never sent into battle, but remained at their bases to continue training recruits. The Alpini battalions were grouped together in regiment-sized Groups (Gruppo), and the groups were attached to brigade-sized Groupings (Raggruppamento), which deployed the Alpini battalions as needed.

The war, today known as the "War in snow and ice", as most of the 600 km frontline ran through mountains and glaciers of the Alps. 12 meters (40 feet) of snow were a usual occurrence during the winter of 1915/16 and thousands of soldiers were lost in avalanches. The remains of these soldiers are still being uncovered today. The Alpini, as well as their Austrian counterparts: Kaiserschützen, Standschützen and Landeschützen occupied every hill and mountain top around the whole year. Huge underground bases were drilled and dug into the mountainsides and into the ice of glaciers such as the Marmolada. Guns were dragged by hundreds of troops on mountains up to 3,890 m (12,760 feet) high. Roads, cable cars, mountain railroads and walkways were built up, through and along the steepest of cliffs. Many of these walkways and roads are still visible today, and many are maintained as Via Ferrata for climbing enthusiasts. In addition, along the former frontline it is still possible to see what is left of hundreds of kilometers of barbed wire.

In this kind of warfare, whoever occupied the higher ground first was almost impossible to dislodge, so both sides turned to drilling tunnels under mountain peaks, filling them up with explosives and then detonated the summits, including its defenders, to pieces: i.e. Col di Lana, Monte Pasubio, Lagazuoi, etc.

Climbing and skiing became essential skills for the troops of both sides and soon ski battalions and special climbing units were formed. It was during these years that the Alpini, their spirit and their deeds became famous. Most of the Alpini songs originated during this time and reflect upon the hardships of the "War in Snow and Ice".

At the war's end the Alpini counted 114,948 casualties: 14,175 KIA, 61,620 WIA, 39,153 MIA (most lost in avalanches or to mine warfare).

=== World War II ===
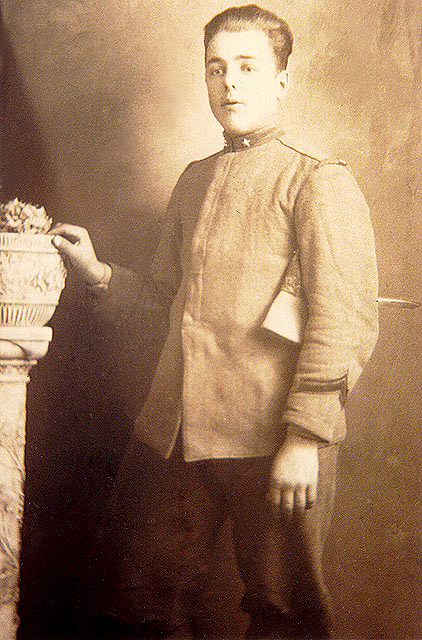
Corporal, Louis Celotti. ca. 1925 (note the Cappello Alpino under his left arm)

After World War I all battalions with the exception of the pre-war battalions were dissolved. In 1919 the Alpini gained the 9th Alpini Regiment. In 1935 the fascist government of Italy reorganized its Armed Forces, creating five Alpine divisions and forming a new Alpini regiment: the 11th Alpini Regiment. A 12th Alpini Regiment was also formed to oversee the battalions of the 9th Alpini Regiment, which were not sent with the regimental command and the 5 Alpine Division Pusteria to fight in the Italian attack on Abyssinia. After the return of the 7th Regiment, the 12 Alpini regiment was dissolved. In 1941 the 6th Alpine Division Alpi Graie was raised with reserve units of the other five Alpine divisions.

Thus Italy fielded the following six alpine divisions during World War II:

- 1st Alpine Division "Taurinense"
- 2nd Alpine Division "Tridentina"
- 3rd Alpine Division "Julia"
- 4th Alpine Division "Cuneense"
- 5th Alpine Division "Pusteria"
- 6th Alpine Division "Alpi Graie"

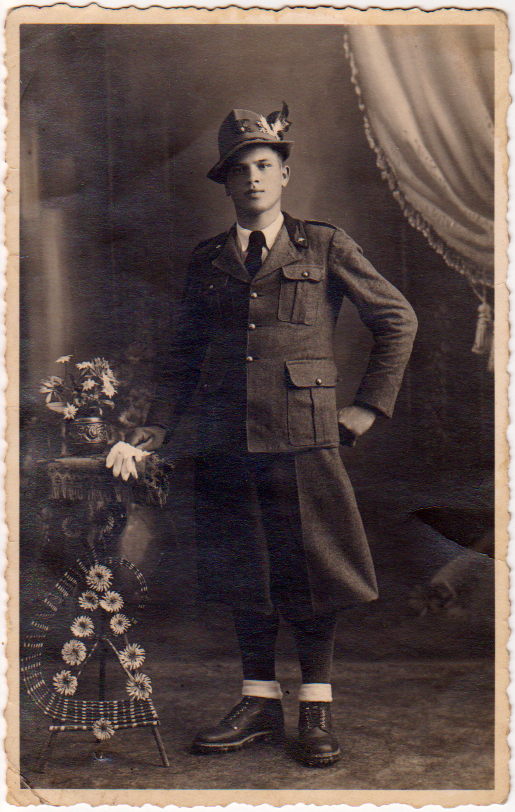
Alpino Della Mora Gelindo in WWII full dress uniform

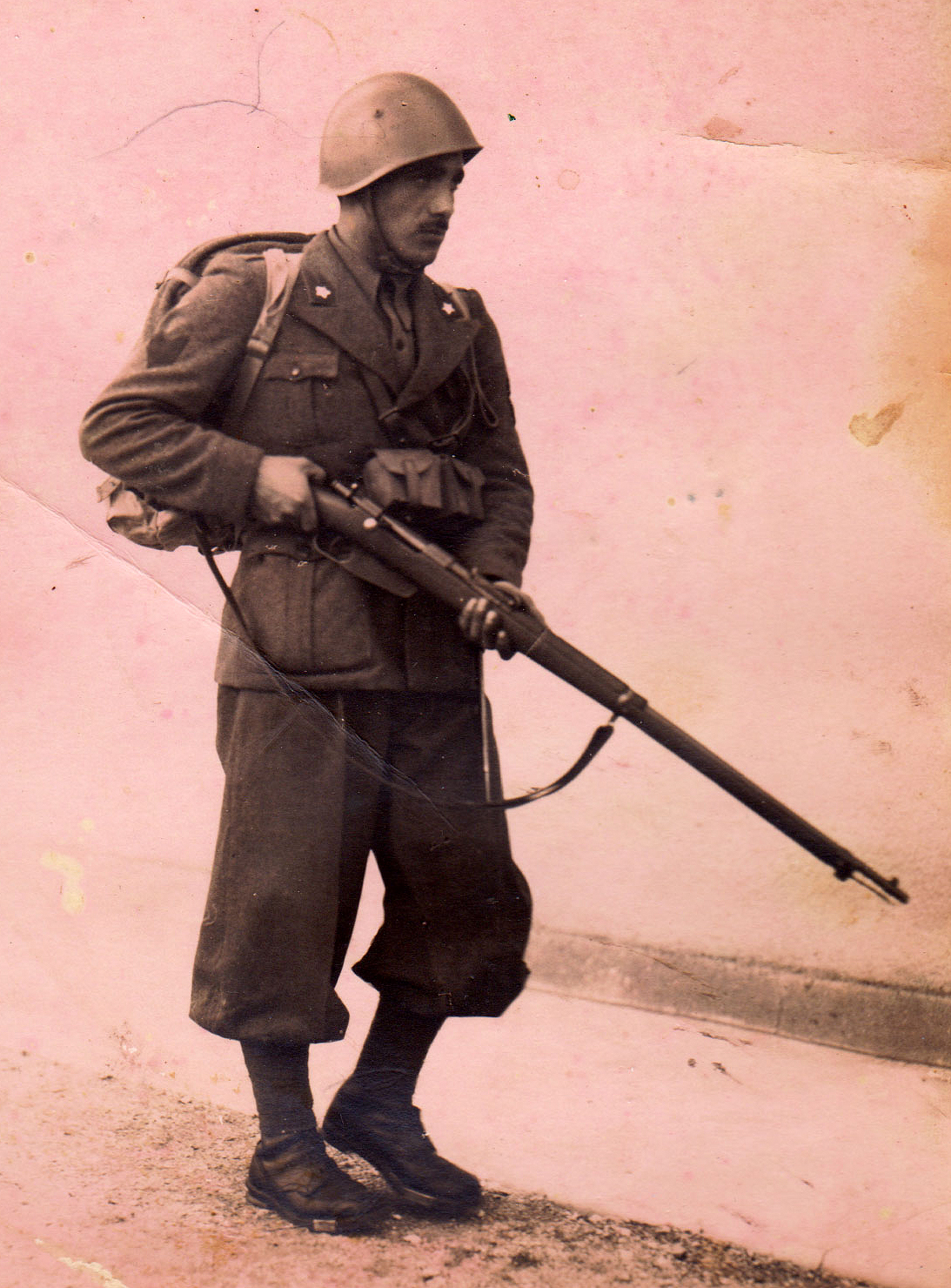
Sergeant Giovannucci Verino in WWII battle uniform

Each division consisted of two Alpini regiments with three battalions each, one Alpine Artillery Regiment with three Artillery groups, one Mixed Engineer Battalion, one Logistic Battalion and some support units. The strength of each division was 573 officers and 16,887 NCOs and soldiers for a total strength of 17,460 men. Also each division had almost 5,000 mules and 500 vehicles of various types at its disposal.
The divisions saw combat in France, Africa, Italy, Albania, The Soviet Union, Yugoslavia and Greece. One Alpini battalion was employed in East Africa. In 1942, Tridentina, Julia and Cuneense division were sent to fight in the Soviet Union. In Russia, instead of being deployed in the Caucasus mountains as expected, the Alpini were tasked with holding a front on the plains of the Don River. As a result of this disastrous strategic decision, troops armed, trained, and equipped for mountain warfare were pitted in the plains against tanks and mechanized infantry, to counter which they were neither equipped nor trained. Despite this, the Alpini held the front until January 1943, when, due to the collapse of the Axis front, they were encircled by the advancing Soviet Army. The Alpini were able to break the encirclement in Battle of Nikolayevka and fight their way towards the new line of the front established after the Axis retreat. Only about one third of the Tridentina division (4250 survivors of 15,000 troops deployed) and one tenth of the Julia (1,200/15,000) were able to survive this odyssey. The Cuneense division was annihilated.

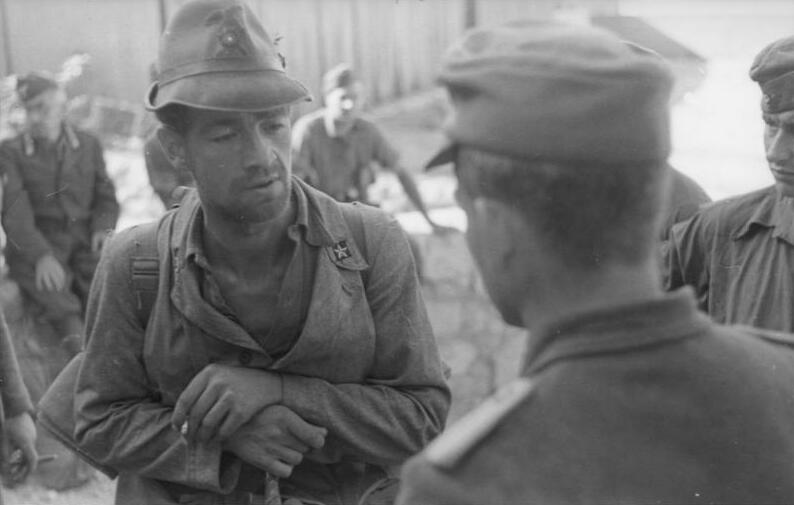
An Alpino speaks with a German officer during the campaign in Yugoslavia.

After the Armistice of Cassibile between the Kingdom of Italy and Western Allies became public on 8 September 1943, Italy split in half. The king went to the South of Italy and left the Royal Italian Army without any orders. Subsequently, most divisions of the Army surrendered without a fight to the invading German forces. The only Alpini division to resist the Germans was the 1st Alpine Division "Taurinense", which along with the 19th Infantry Division "Venezia" and remnants of the 155th Infantry Division "Emilia" resisted German attempts to occupy Montenegro. After suffering heavy casualties the divisions troops were given the choice to either surrender or to retreat into the Durmitor mountains and continue the fight. The 16,000 men, who had chosen to fight, formed then the Italian Partisan Division Garibaldi, which entered the II Corps of the Yugoslav Partisans and fought on the Yugoslav Front until it returned to Italy in March 1945.

On June 25, 1944, the 3rd Alpini Regiment was recreated in Southern Italy with the battalions Piemonte and Monte Granero. Along with the 4th Bersaglieri Regiment it formed the 1st Italian Brigade of the Italian Liberation Corps, which fought in the war on the Allied side. After the Bersaglieri regiment had suffered heavy casualties the two regiments were merged on 30 September 1944 to form the Special Infantry Regiment, which entered the Legnano Combat Group. The Combat Group was equipped with British weapons and materiel and fought as part of the Polish II Corps on the extreme left of the British 8th Army near the river Idice.

In the north a fascist regime under dictator Benito Mussolini, known as the Republic of Salò continued the war alongside the Germans. Its Army, the fascist National Republican Army, raised the 4th Alpine Division "Monterosa", which was trained and equipped by Nazi Germany. The division fought along the Gothic Line, notably against units of Brazilian Expeditionary Division, U.S. 92nd Infantry Division and 8th Indian Infantry Division. At the end of the final allied offensive, the division surrendered after the Battle of Collecchio.

=== Cold War ===
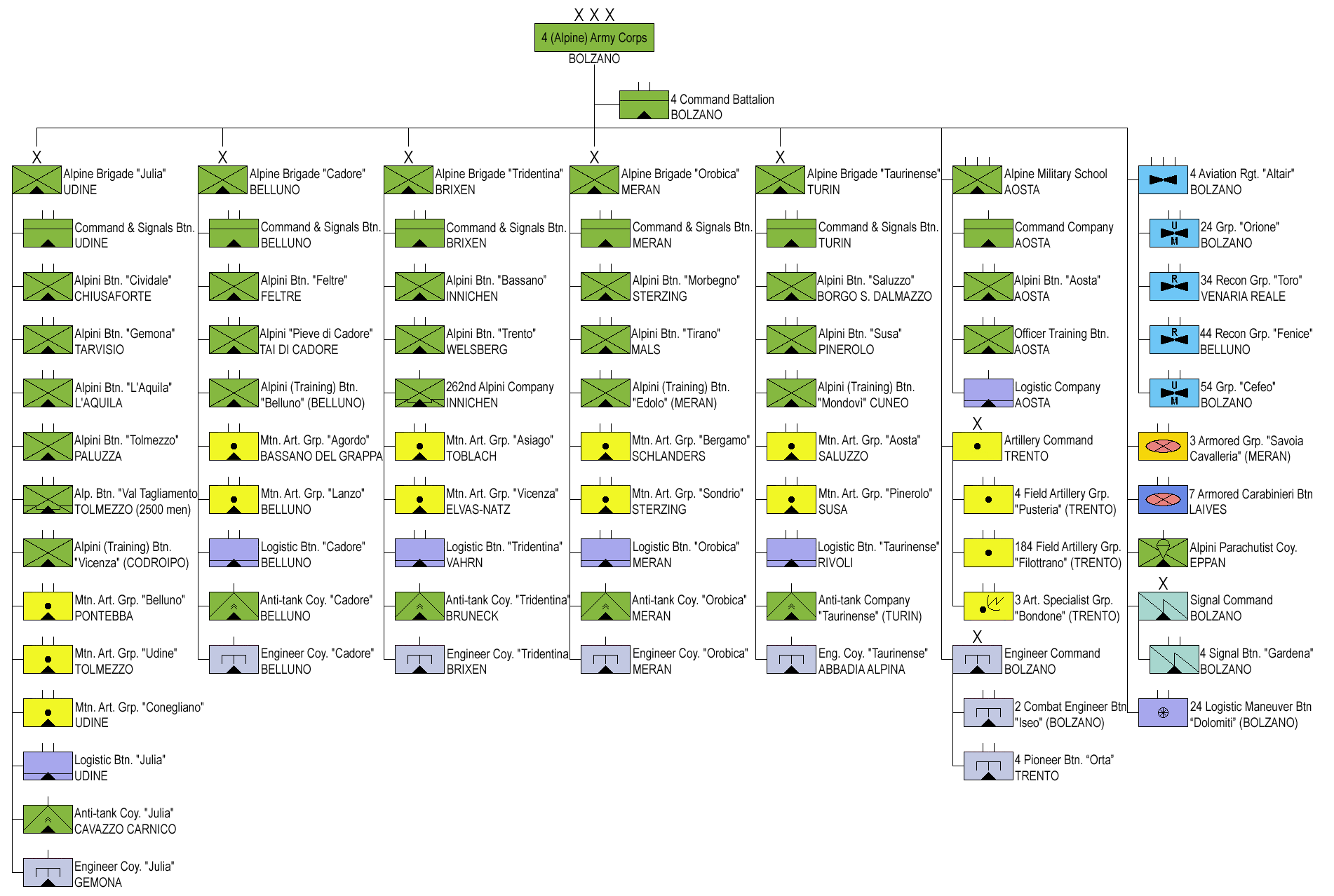
Structure of the 4th Alpine Army Corps 1986 (click to enlarge)

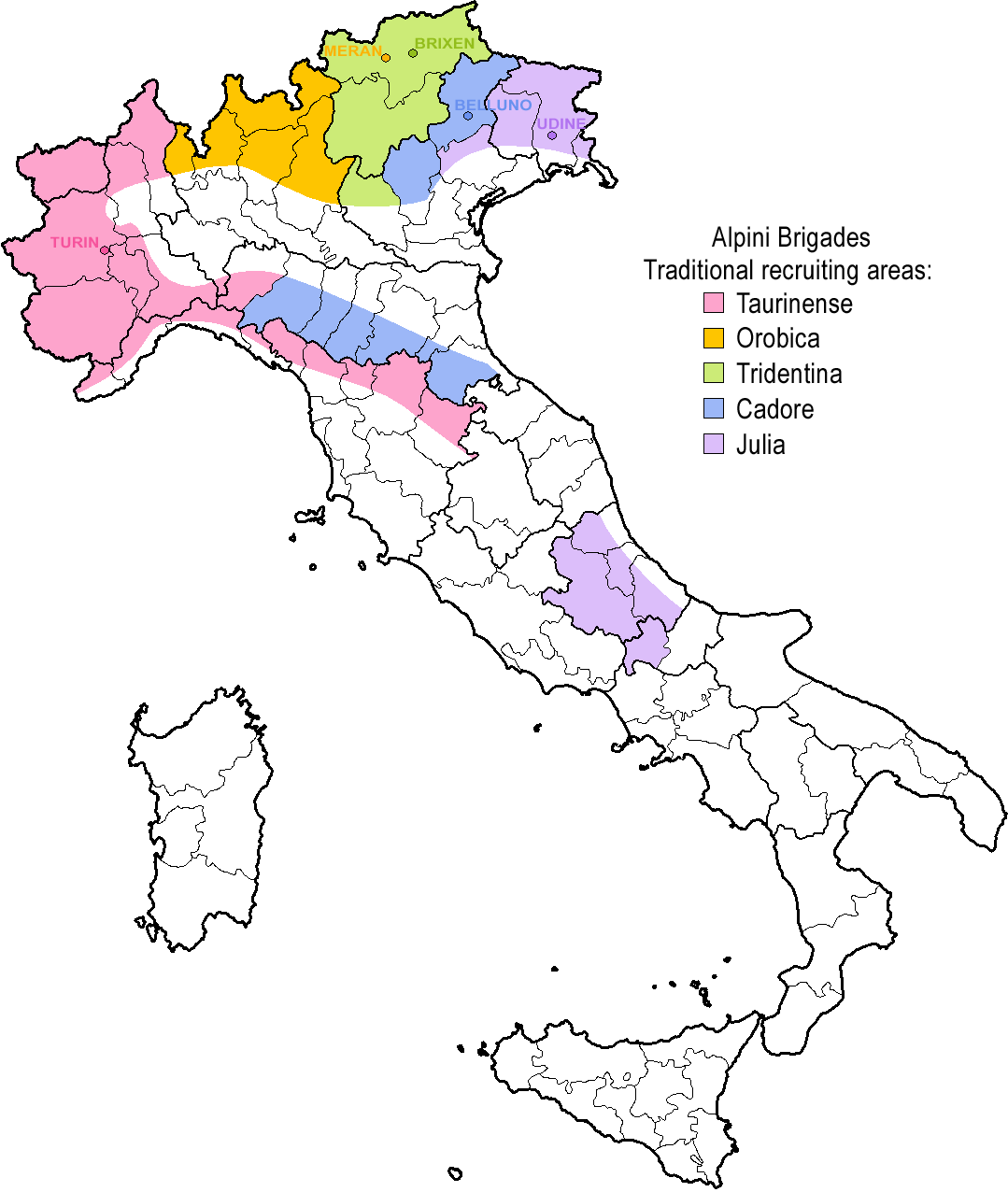
Recruiting areas of the five post-war Alpini brigades

After World War II the Alpini units were once more tasked with defending Italy's northern borders. On 15 October 1949 the Alpine Brigade Julia was activated in Udine; on 1 May 1951 the Alpine Brigade Tridentina was activated in Brixen; on 15 April 1952 the Alpine Brigade Taurinense was activated in Turin; on 1 January 1953 the Alpine Brigade Orobica was activated in Meran and on 1 July 1953 the Alpine Brigade Cadore was activated in Belluno. Each brigade recruited its soldiers from specific parts of the mountainous areas of Italy thus creating a strong bond with the local populations. But only in 1972 when the Taurinense joined the IV Army Corps a singular command was finally in place for all the Alpini, Alpine and Mountain units of the Italian Army.

- **IV Alpine Army Corps**
  - Julia
  - Taurinense
  - Tridentina
  - Cadore
  - Orobica

After the 1976 reform the IV Alpine Army Corps was responsible to defend the Italian border along the main chain of the alps from the Swiss-Austrian-Italian border tripoint in the west to the Italian-Yugoslavian border in the east. In case of war with Yugoslavia the IV Alpine Army Corps would remain static in its position guarding the left flank of the Italian V Corps, which would meet the enemy forces in the plains of Friuli-Venezia Giulia. The only brigade which would have seen combat in such a case would have been the Julia.

In case of a war with the Warsaw Pact the IV Alpine Army Corps had two war plans: one in the case the Soviet Southern Group of Forces and Hungarian Army would march through Yugoslavia and the other in case the Warsaw Pact would violate the Austrian neutrality and march through Austria. In case the enemy forces would come through Yugoslavia, the Julia would cover the mountainous left flank of the 5th Corps, which with its four armoured and five mechanized brigades would try to wear down the enemy before it could break out into the North Italian Padan plain. The other Alpini brigades would remain static.

In the more likely case the Soviet and Hungarian divisions would invade Austria and march through Southern Styria and through the Drava Valley in Carinthia the Alpini brigades would have been the first front line units of the Italian Army: the Julia would have defended the Canal Valley, the Cadore would have defended the Piave Valley and the Tridentina the Puster Valley, while the Orobica had a special mission and the Taurinense would remain in reserve.

== Today ==
=== Structure ===
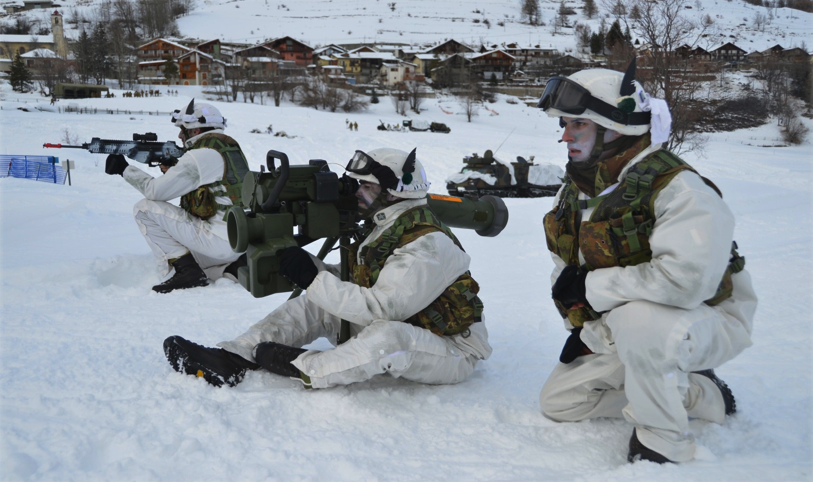
Alpini of the 217th Anti-Tank Company with a Spike anti-tank missile, "Saluzzo" Battalion, 2nd Alpini Regiment

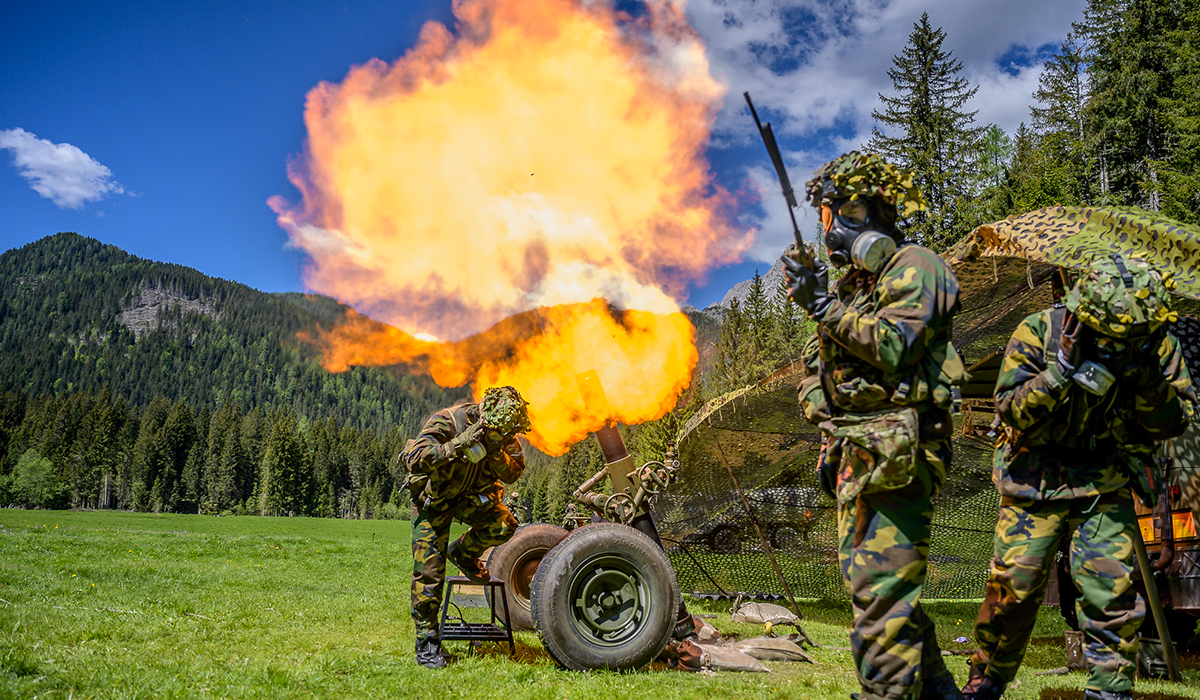
8th Alpini Regiment Heavy Mortar Platoon on exercise

After the end of the Cold War, all but the Julia and Taurinense Brigades were dissolved, thus leaving the following Alpini units, that still carry the "fiamme verdi" collar insignia:

- Tridentina Division:
  - Command and Tactical Supports Unit "Tridentina"
- Alpine Brigade "Taurinense"
  - 1st Alpini Command and Tactical Supports Unit
  - 2nd Alpini Regiment "Saluzzo" Battalion
  - 3rd Alpini Regiment "Susa" Battalion
  - 9th Alpini Regiment "L'Aquila" Battalion and "Vicenza" Battalion
  - 1st Field Artillery Regiment (Mountain) "Aosta" Mountain Artillery Group
  - 32nd Engineer Regiment 30th Sapper Battalion
  - Logistic Regiment "Taurinense" Logistic Battalion
- Alpine Brigade Julia
  - 14th Alpini Command and Tactical Supports Unit
  - 5th Alpini Regiment "Morbegno" Battalion
  - 7th Alpini Regiment "Feltre" Battalion
  - 8th Alpini Regiment "Tolmezzo" Battalion
  - 3rd Field Artillery Regiment (Mountain) "Conegliano" Mountain Artillery Group
  - 2nd Alpine Engineer Regiment "Iseo" Sapper Battalion
  - Logistic Regiment "Julia" with Logistic Battalion
- as part of other Military Commands:
  - 4th Alpini Paratroopers Regiment "Monte Cervino" Battalion
  - 2nd Alpine Signal Regiment "Gardena" Battalion and "Pordoi" Battalion
  - Alpine Training Center "Aosta" Battalion, in Aosta
    - 6th Alpini Regiment "Bassano" Battalion (high altitude training), in Bruneck (South Tyrol)

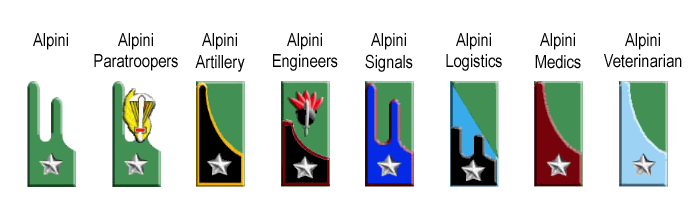
Collar Patches worn by Alpini today

=== Geographical distribution ===
Alpini and Alpine units locations 2018

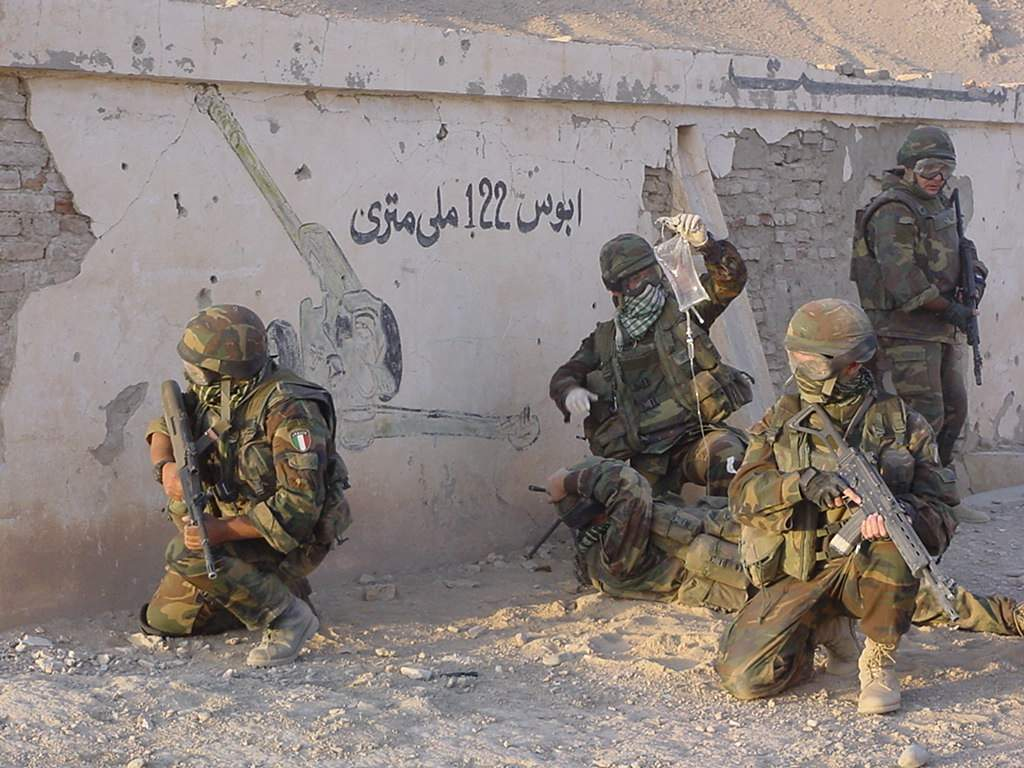
Alpini from the 4th Alpini Regiment in Afghanistan

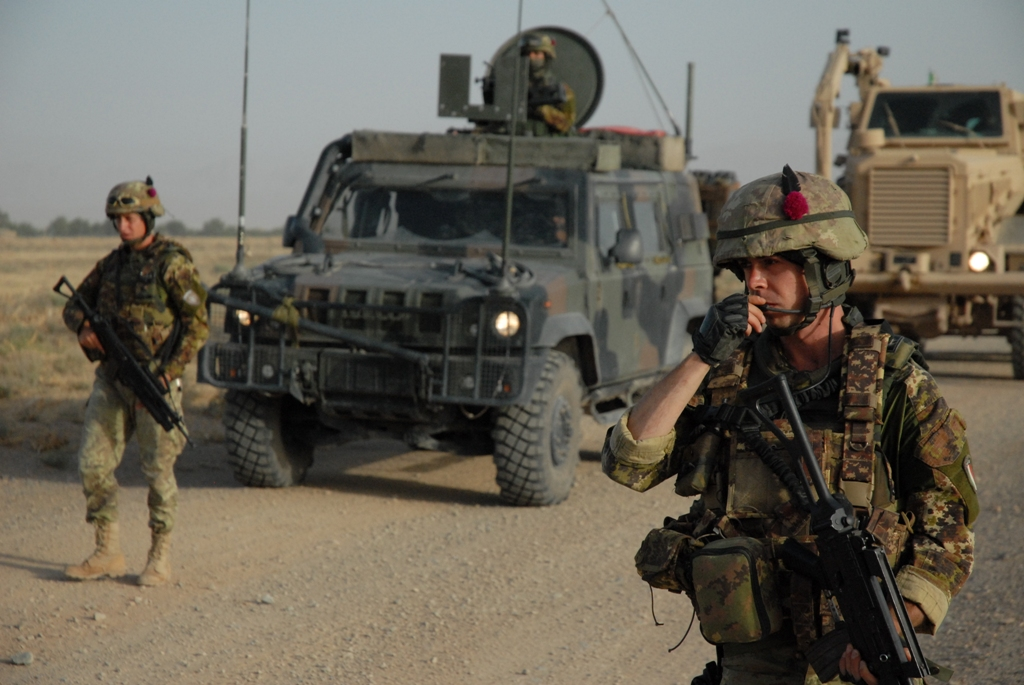
Alpini Sappers of the 32nd Alpine Engineer Regiment in Afghanistan

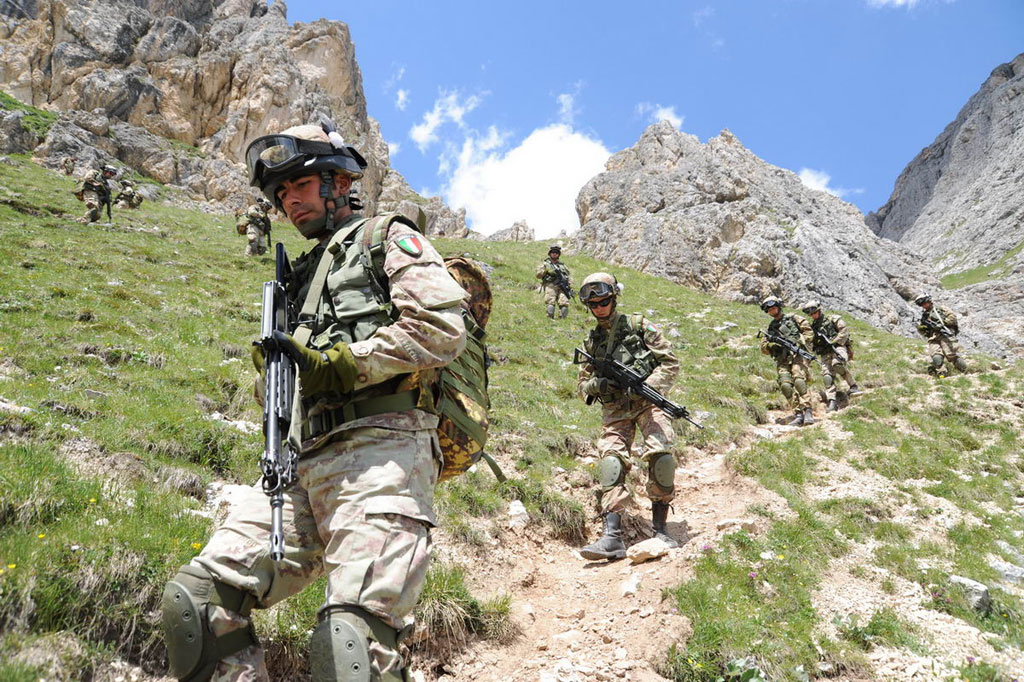
Alpini from the 7th Alpini Regiment on exercise

=== Armament ===
Currently an Alpino is equipped with a Beretta ARX 160 assault rifle, usually fitted with an Aimpoint M3 Reddot, a Beretta 92 FS pistol, OD/82SE hand grenades, a Type III AP/98 (they are now slowly being provided with the newest NC4/09 bulletproof vest, phasing out the AP/98) bullet-proof vest and a 3rd generation night vision device.

The squad automatic weapon is the FN Minimi or, alternatively, the Rheinmetall MG3. Supporting fire can be provided also by M2 Browning (0.50") machine gun, the Hirtenberger M6C-210 Commando 60 mm, man-portable light mortar or by the MO-120-RT-61 120 mm heavy mortar.

Mobility is provided by the use of Iveco VTLM Lince 4WD tactical vehicles, Puma 6x6 Armored Personnel Carriers and Bv 206 / Bv 206S all terrain tracked vehicles.

The anti-tank weapons are the Panzerfaust 3 rocket propelled grenade and the MILAN 2 and TOW II anti-tank guided missiles. The later two will be replaced by the Spike anti-tank guided missile over the next years.

In 1999 the artillery regiments have been issued with the FH-70 howitzer. This has led to a great increase in firepower compared to the previously used OTO Melara Mod 56 pack howitzer, but also reduced their versatility. Indeed, they are not designated now as "mountain artillery", but as "Field Artillery (Mountain)" regiments.

Currently the Alpini are being provided with a small number of ARX-160 rifles to field-test the designated standard rifle of the Italian Army in harsh and cold environments.

== Ranks of the Alpini ==
The Alpini share the ranks of the Italian Army but have an additional rank insignia on their Cappello Alpino uniform. All enlisted personnel and junior non-commissioned officers wear no insignia, only officers and senior NCOs wear them and special rank insignia are used by them in the form of chevrons increasing by rank until the rank of Colonel and by silver collar ribbons by general officers.

Enlisted and Junior NCOs – No Insignia

- Alpino
- Caporale – Private E1 (Corporal)
- Caporal Maggiore – Private First Class (Corporal Major)
- Primo caporal maggiore – Lance Corporal (Corporal Maj. 1st Class)
- Caporale maggiore scelto – Corporal (Senior Corporal Major)
- Caporal Maggiore capo – Master Corporal (Chief Corporal Major)
- Caporal Maggiore capo scelto – Lance Sergeant (Senior Chief Corporal Major)
- Sergente – Sergeant
- Sergente maggiore – Staff Sergeant (Sergeant major)
- Sergente maggiore capo – Sergeant First Class
- Sergente maggiore capo scelto - Sergeant First Class

Senior NCOs

- Maresciallo – Master Sergeant (Marshal): 1 small plain green chevron
- Maresciallo ordinario – First Sergeant (Ordinary marshal): 1 small plain green chevron
- Maresciallo capo – Sergeant Major (Chief Marshal): 1 small plain green chevron
- Primo Maresciallo – Command Sergeant Major (First Marshal): 1 green chevron with red border
- Luogotenente – 1st Command Sergeant Major/Warrant officer (Sublieutenant) : 1 small green chevron with red border and a gold star
- Primo luogotenente – Chief warrant officer(Sublieutenant 1st class): 1 small green chevron with red border and a gold star

Junior and Field Officers

- Sottotenente – Sublieutenant/Second lieutenant : Plain gold small chevron
- Tenente – Lieutenant : Two gold small chevrons with blue border
- Capitano – Captain : Three gold chevrons with two blue borders
- Maggiore – Major: Three gold chevrons with one blue border
- Tenente Colonello – Lieutenant colonel : Four gold chevrons with two blue borders
- Colonello – Colonel : Six gold chevrons with three blue borders

General Officers

- Generale di Brigata – Brigadier General (Brigade General) : One bright gold star on the silver collar marking
- Generale di Divisione – Major General (Divisional General): Two gold stars on the silver collar marking
- Generale di Corpo d'Armata – Lieutenant General (Corps General): Three gold stars on the silver collar marking

== National Alpini Association ==
The ANA (Associazione Nazionale Alpini or National Alpini Association) is a registered society representing the "Veci" ( ie "the old ones" in English; singular: "vecio" ) or former members of the Alpini corps. As the "Veci" see themselves as merely "on leave" rather than veterans, the ANA is colloquially known to be the 10th Alpini Regiment. Every year since 1920 the ANA has organized a national reunion the "Veci". Hundreds of thousands of Alpini congregate with family and friends in an Italian city for a weekend in the late spring to celebrate and have a good time while remembering old times.

== Hymn of the Alpini Corps ==
The Alpini Hymn L'Inno degli Alpini or Trentatrè - valore Alpino is the official hymn of the Alpini Corps, adapted from an old French mountain song by D'Estel and Travel. As the official anthem of the corps it forms part of the various songs and marches played by the Corps' military bands on parades and concerts, in the latter, the second to the last song to be played before the Italian National Anthem.
I
Dai fidi tetti del villaggio i bravi alpini son partiti,
mostran la forza ed il coraggio della lor salda gioventù.

Son dell'Alpe i bei cadetti, nella robusta giovinezza
dai loro baldi e forti petti spira un'indomita fierezza.

Chorus (2x)
Oh valore alpin! Difendi sempre la frontiera!
E là sul confin tien sempre alta la bandiera.

Sentinella all'erta per il suol nostro italiano
dove amor sorride e più benigno irradia il sol.

II
Là tra le selve ed i burroni, là tra le nebbie fredde e il gelo,
piantan con forza i lor picconi le vie rendon più brevi.

E quando il sole brucia e scalda le cime e le profondità,
il fiero Alpino scruta e guarda, pronto a dare il "Chi va là?"

Repeat Chorus 2x

== Alpini in Media ==
- The 1943 film Men of the Mountain, an Italian propaganda production starring Amedeo Nazzari and Mariella Lotti
- Centomila gavette di ghiaccio ('One hundred thousand mess tins of ice'), a best seller book by Giulio Bedeschi, former medical officer in the Gruppo Conegliano of 3rd Mountain Artillery Regiment (Julia Division) in World War II. The book is about the epic Ritirata di Russia ('Retreat from Russia') that involved Alpini and other Axis units during the 1942/1943 winter.
- Mino, an Italian TV series about the Aosta battalion in World War I.
- Il sergente nella neve ('The sergeant in the snow'), a book by Mario Rigoni Stern about the Vestone battalion (Tridentina Division) in World War II.
- Mai tardi ('Never late'), a book by Nuto Revelli about the Tirano battalion (Tridentina Division) in World War II.
- The mission called "Avanti Savoia!", in the video game Battlefield 1, has the Alpini as protagonists.
- The 2022 video game Isonzo has the Alpini inspired mountaineer as one of six selectable classes.

== See also ==
- List of mountain warfare forces
- Argentina: Cazadores de Montaña (Argentine Army)
- France: Chasseurs Alpins
- Germany: Gebirgsjäger
- Poland: Podhale rifles
- Romania: Vânători de munte

== Sources ==
- Italian Army- The Alpini
- COMALP- Alpine Troops Command
- ANA Conegliano- History of Alpini units
- The largest picture collection of 2012 Bolzano
