= Signore delle cime =

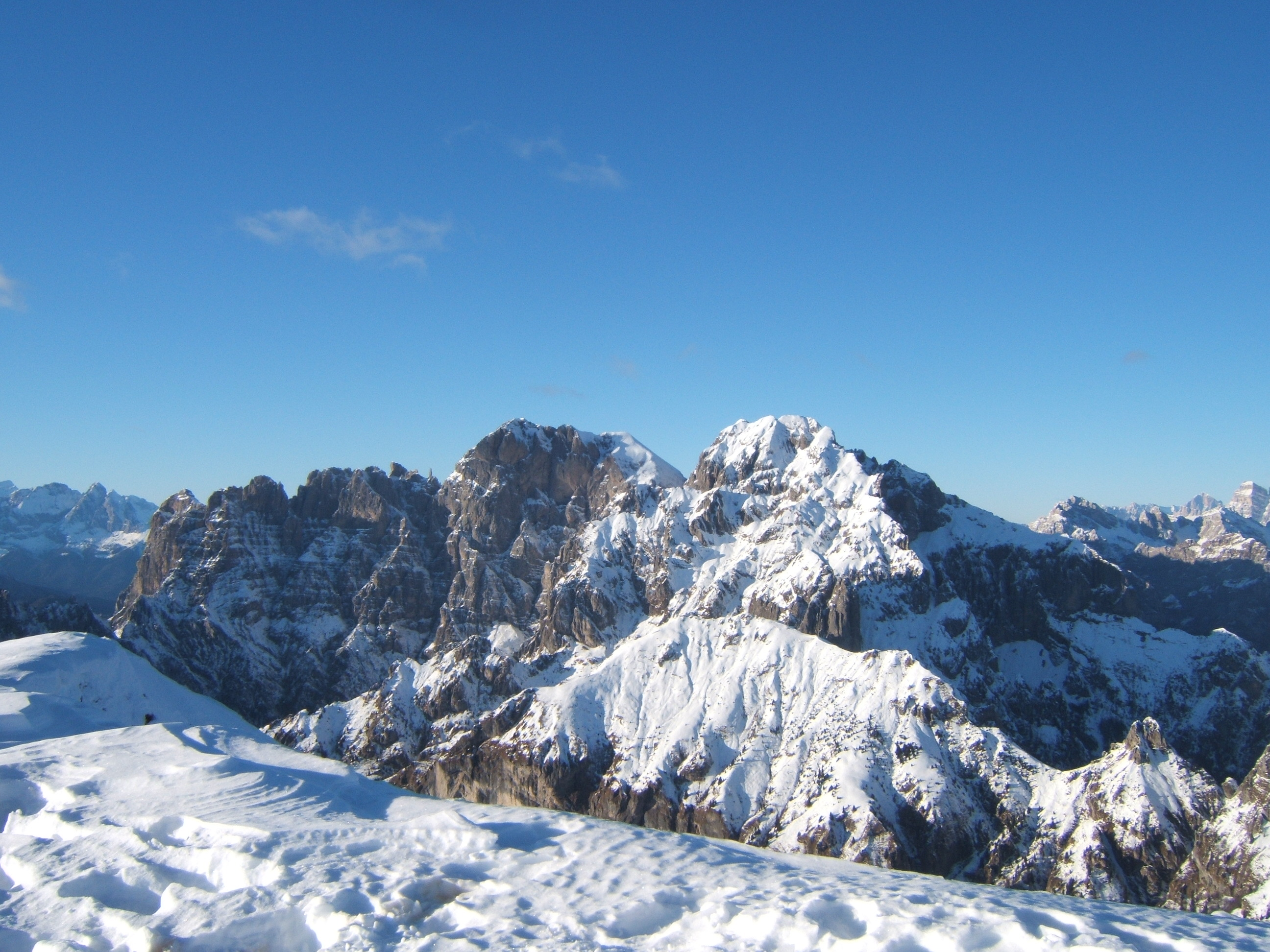
- View of Schiara Group from Mount Serva

Song by I Crodaioli Choir
- Language: Italian
- English title: Lord of the Mountain Tops
- Written: 1958
- Published: 1958
- Songwriter: Bepi De Marzi

Signore delle cime ("Lord of the Mountain Tops") is a popular Italian song of prayer. It was written by Bepi De Marzi in 1958, when he was 23 years old: he dedicated the song to his friend Bepi Bertagnoli who died in 1951 while climbing Mount Gramolon in the upper Valle del Chiampo.

== History ==
The song became very popular and was translated into many languages. The song is performed every year at the festival of the Adunata Nazionale degli Alpini, which since 1920 has usually been celebrated annually in mid-May.

The simplicity of the song and its great emotional impact have ensured its inclusion in the repertoire of many polyphonic choirs, such as I Crodaioli of Arzignano, founded by de Marzi. The simple melody is accompanied by traditional harmonies and combined with a text that represents feeling, popular piety and Christian devotion.

== Text ==
The song is composed in 2 strophes or verses:

- in the first verse, de Marzi and the choir pray God to let Bepi Bertagnoli enter Paradise, and allow him to climb Heaven's mountains;
- in the second verse, they also pray the Virgin Mary to cover their friend with her soft white cloak before taking him to Heaven;
