= Italian Army in Russia order of battle =

Italian Army forces in the Soviet Union during WW2

The Italian Army in Russia (ARMIR) was a field army of the Royal Italian Army in World War II, which was deployed to the Soviet Union in July 1942. Upon arrival on the Eastern Front the army consisted of the following units:

== Italian Army in Russia ==
=== 8th Army Headquarters ===
- 8th Army — Generale d'Armata Italo Gariboldi
  - Headquarters — Chief of Staff: Generale di Divisione Bruno Malaguti
    - 175th Motorized Carabinieri Section
    - 236th Mixed Carabinieri Section
    - 237th Mixed Carabinieri Section
    - 238th Mixed Carabinieri Section
    - 239th Mixed Carabinieri Section
    - 243rd Mixed Carabinieri Section
    - 244th Mixed Carabinieri Section
    - 245th Mixed Carabinieri Section
    - 283rd Mixed Carabinieri Section
    - 373rd Mounted Carabinieri Section
    - Cossacks Squadrons Group — Major Ranieri di Campello
      - 3 × Cossack Sotnias
  - Mounted Grouping — Generale di Brigata Guglielmo Barbò
    - Regiment "Savoia Cavalleria"
      - Command Squadron
      - I Squadrons Group
        - 2 × Cavaliers squadrons
      - II Squadrons Group
        - 2 × Cavaliers squadrons
      - 5th Machine Gunners Squadron
    - Regiment "Lancieri di Novara"
      - Command Squadron
      - I Squadrons Group
        - 2 × Lancers squadrons
      - II Squadrons Group
        - 2 × Lancers squadrons
      - 5th Machine Gunners Squadron
  - 8th Army Chemical Grouping
    - I Motorized Chemical Battalion
    - IV Motorized Chemical Battalion
  - 88th Motorized Croatian Legion
    - Command
    - Fusiliers Battalion
      - Command Company
      - 3 × Fusilier companies
      - 1 × Machine Gunners Company
    - Mortar Company — 81mm mod. 35 mortars
    - Anti-tank Company — 47/32 anti-tank guns
  - Skiers Battalion "Monte Cervino"
    - Command Platoon
    - 2 × Skiers companies
    - 2 × Machine gunners platoons
    - 80th Support Weapons Company
  - CIX Auto-transported Machine Gunners Battalion
    - Command Company
    - 3 × Machine gunners companies

==== ARMIR Artillery Commander ====
- ARMIR Artillery Commander — Generale di Divisione Mario Balotta
  - 3rd Horse Artillery Regiment
    - Command Unit
    - I Horse Group
      - 2 × Batteries — 4 × horse-drawn 75/27 mod. 12 guns per battery
    - II Horse Group
      - 2 × Batteries — 4 × horse-drawn 75/27 mod. 12 guns per battery
    - III Horse Group
      - 2 × Batteries — 4 × horse-drawn 75/27 mod. 12 guns per battery
    - Regimental Ammunition and Supply Unit
  - 9th Army Artillery Grouping
    - XXIV Group
      - 3 × Batteries — 4 × 15 cm sFH 18 (149/28) heavy field howitzers per battery
    - XXXI Group
      - 3 × Batteries — 4 × 149/40 mod. 35 heavy guns per battery
    - XXXII Group
      - 3 × Batteries — 4 × 149/40 mod. 35 heavy guns per battery
    - XXXIV Group
      - 3 × Batteries — 4 × 149/40 mod. 35 heavy guns per battery
    - L Group
      - 3 × Batteries — 4 × 15 cm sFH 18 (149/28) heavy field howitzers per battery
    - LXXIII Group
      - 3 × Batteries — 4 × 210/22 mod. 35 heavy howitzers per battery
  - 201st Motorized Artillery Regiment
    - Command Unit
    - I Group
      - 3 × Batteries — 4 × 75/32 mod. 37 field guns per battery
    - II Group
      - 3 × Batteries — 4 × 75/32 mod. 37 field guns per battery
    - III Group
      - 3 × Batteries — 4 × 75/32 mod. 37 field guns per battery
    - Regimental Ammunition and Supply Unit
  - 4th Anti-aircraft Artillery Grouping
    - IV Anti-aircraft Group
      - 2 × Batteries — 4 × 75/46 C.A. mod. 34 anti-aircraft guns per battery
    - XIX Anti-aircraft Group
      - 2 × Batteries — 4 × 75/46 C.A. mod. 34 anti-aircraft guns per battery
    - XXXVI Anti-aircraft Group
      - 3 × Batteries — 4 × 75/46 C.A. mod. 34 anti-aircraft guns per battery
    - XXXVII Anti-aircraft Group
      - 3 × Batteries — 4 × 75/46 C.A. mod. 34 anti-aircraft guns per battery
    - XXXVIII Anti-aircraft Group
      - 3 × Batteries — 4 × 75/46 C.A. mod. 34 anti-aircraft guns per battery
  - 14th Artillery Specialists Unit
  - 31st Anti-aircraft Battery — 8 × 20/65 mod. 35 anti-aircraft guns
  - 40th Anti-aircraft Battery — 8 × 20/65 mod. 35 anti-aircraft guns
  - 42nd Anti-aircraft Battery — 8 × 20/65 mod. 35 anti-aircraft guns
  - 65th Anti-aircraft Battery — 8 × 20/65 mod. 35 anti-aircraft guns

==== ARMIR Engineers Commander ====
- ARMIR Engineers Commander — Generale di Divisione Arnaldo Forgiero
  - 5th Connections Grouping
    - I Telegraph Operators Battalion
      - Command Platoon
      - 4 × Telegraph operator companies
    - V Mixed Battalion
      - Command Platoon
      - Mixed Connections Company
      - Mixed Specialists Company
    - 156th Radio Operators Company
  - I Pontieri Battalion
  - II Pontieri Battalion
  - IX Pontieri Battalion
  - IX Ferrovieri Battalion
  - X Ferrovieri Battalion
  - XVIII Workers Battalion
    - 4 × Worker companies
  - XXVI Engineer Battalion
  - XXXIV Pontieri Battalion
  - XL Workers Battalion
    - 3 × Worker companies
  - 6th Firefighting Company
  - 8th Water Company
  - 9th Water Company
  - 101st Ferrymen Company
  - 8th Mobile Dovecote
  - 86th Searchlight Section

==== ARMIR Air Commander ====
- ARMIR Air Commander — Generale di Brigata Aerea Enrico Pezzi (until 29 December 1942, then until 12 January 1943 Generale di Brigata Aerea] Ugo Rampelli)
  - XXI Fighter Group
    - Command — 3 × Macchi C.202 Folgore, 2 × SM.81 Pipistrello, 3 × Ca.133
    - 356th Squadron — 12 × Macchi C.202 Folgore
    - 361st Squadron — 12 × Macchi C.202 Folgore
    - 382nd Squadron — 12 × Macchi C.202 Folgore
    - 386th Squadron — 12 × Macchi C.202 Folgore
  - LXXI Observation Group
    - Command — 1 × SM.81 Pipistrello
    - 38th Squadron — 16 × Ca.311
    - 116th Squadron — 16 × Ca.311
  - 245th Transport Squadron — Savoia-Marchetti SM.81 Pipistrello|SM.81 Pipistrello
  - 246th Transport Squadron — SM.81 Pipistrello
  - 247th Transport Squadron — SM.81 Pipistrello
  - 6 × Airbase defence squadrons — 20/65 mod. 35 anti-aircraft guns
  - Royal Air Force Auto Park

==== 156th Infantry Division "Vicenza" ====
The 156th Infantry Division "Vicenza" was tasked with rear area security.

- 156th Infantry Division "Vicenza" — Generale di Divisione Enrico Broglia (until 7 December 1942, then Generale di Brigata Etelvoldo Pascolini)
  - Headquarters
    - 136th Mixed Carabinieri Section
    - 137th Mixed Carabinieri Section
    - 156th Field Post Office
  - 277th Infantry Regiment "Vicenza"
    - Command Company
    - Cannons Company — 4 × 47/32 anti-tank guns
    - Mortar Company — 9 × 81mm mod. 35 mortars
    - 3 × Fusilier battalions
      - Command Company
      - 3 × Fusilier companies
      - Support Weapons Company — Breda M37 machine guns and 45mm mod. 35 mortars
  - 278th Infantry Regiment "Vicenza"
    - Command Company
    - Cannons Company — 4 × 47/32 anti-tank guns
    - Mortar Company — 9 × 81mm mod. 35 mortars
    - 3 × Fusilier battalions
      - Command Company
      - 3 × Fusilier companies
      - Support Weapons Company — Breda M37 machine guns and 45mm mod. 35 mortars
  - CLVI Machine Gunners Battalion
    - Command Company
    - 3 × Machine gunners companies
  - CLVI Mixed Engineer Battalion
    - 156th Engineer Company
    - 256th Telegraph and Radio Operators Company
  - XXVI Carabinieri Battalion (attached)
    - 2 × Carabinieri companies
    - Carabinieri Fusiliers and Machine Gunners Company
  - 256th Anti-tank Company — 47/32 anti-tank guns
  - 156th Medical Section
    - 161st Field Hospital
    - 162nd Field Hospital
  - 156th Supply Section
  - 256th Bakers Section
  - 1121st Mixed Transport Section
  - I Armored Car Platoon/ Regiment "Nizza Cavalleria" — 2 × AB41 armored cars (attached)

=== II Army Corps ===
II Army Corps organization during the campaign in the Soviet Union

- II Army Corps — Generale di Corpo d'Armata Giovanni Zanghieri
  - II Army Corps Headquarters — Chief of Staff: Colonel Ugo Almici
    - 183rd Mixed Carabinieri Section
    - 204th Mixed Carabinieri Section
    - 362nd Mounted Carabinieri Section
    - 9th Topographic Section
    - 2nd Photo Squad
    - 9th Telephoto Squad
    - 20th Field Post Office
    - 21st Auto-train Command
    - 2nd Auto Squad for Army Corps Command
  - II Army Corps Infantry
    - II Army Corps Machine Gunners Battalion (Mule carried)
      - Command Company
      - 3 × Machine Gunners companies
    - II Infantry Sappers Battalion
      - Command Platoon
      - 2 × Infantry Sappers companies
    - XXXII Anti-tank Battalion (formed by the Granatieri di Sardegna)
      - Command Company
      - 3 × Anti-tank companies — 8 × 47/32 anti-tank guns per company
    - CII Army Corps Machine Gunners Battalion (Auto-transported)
      - Command Company
      - 3 × Machine Gunners companies
  - II Army Corps Artillery — Generale di Brigata Mario Martorelli (until 1 December 1942, then Generale di Brigata Italo Giglio)
    - 2nd Army Corps Artillery Grouping
      - III Group
        - 3 × Batteries — 4 × 105/28 cannons per battery
      - XXIII Group
        - 3 × Batteries — 4 × 105/28 cannons per battery
      - CIII Group
        - 3 × Batteries — 4 × 149/13 heavy howitzers per battery
      - CXXIII Group
        - 3 × Batteries — 4 × 149/13 heavy howitzers per battery
      - 2nd Army Corps Artillery Specialists Unit
      - 52nd Anti-aircraft Battery — 8 × 20/65 mod. 35 anti-aircraft guns
      - 54th Anti-aircraft Battery — 8 × 20/65 mod. 35 anti-aircraft guns
  - II Army Corps Engineers — Generale di Brigata Balilla Rima
    - XV Engineer Battalion
      - Command Platoon
      - 1st Engineer Company
      - 2nd Engineer Company
      - 104th Engineer Company
    - 82nd Telegraph Operators Company
    - 84th Telegraph Operators Company
    - 101st Radio Operators Company
    - 6th Mobile Dovecote
    - 2nd Connections Materiel Repair Workshop
  - II Army Corps Chemical Troops
    - 2nd Chemical Company
    - 4th Flamethrower Company
    - 5th Flamethrower Company
  - II Army Corps Services
    - 2nd Heavy Transport Unit
      - 2nd Ambulance Section
      - 12th Ambulance Section
      - 249th Heavy Transport Section
      - 948th Heavy Transport Section
      - Mixed Transport Section
    - 45th Heavy Mobile Workshop
    - 4th Materiel Recovery Company
  - 82nd Medical Section
    - 14th Field Hospital
    - 15th Field Hospital
    - 120th Field Hospital
    - 203rd Field Hospital
    - 213th Field Hospital
    - 243rd Field Hospital
    - 27th Radiological Ambulatory
    - 42nd Radiological Ambulatory
    - 2nd Dental Ambulatory
    - 11th Disinfection Section
  - 70th Supply Section

==== 2nd Infantry Division "Sforzesca" ====
- 2nd Infantry Division "Sforzesca" — Generale di Divisione Carlo Pellegrini
  - Headquarters
    - 4th Mixed Carabinieri Section
    - 5th Motorized Carabinieri Section
    - 69th Field Post Office
    - 2nd Auto Squad for Infantry Division Command
  - 53rd Infantry Regiment "Sforzesca"
    - Command Company
    - Support Weapons Battery — 65/17 mod. 13 mountain guns
    - Mortar Company — 81mm mod. 35 mortars
    - 3 × Fusilier battalions
      - Command Company
      - 3 × Fusilier companies
      - Support Weapons Company — Breda M37 machine guns and 45mm mod. 35 mortars
  - 54th Infantry Regiment "Sforzesca"
    - Command Company
    - Support Weapons Battery — 65/17 mod. 13 mountain guns
    - Mortar Company — 81mm mod. 35 mortars
    - 3 × Fusilier battalions
      - Command Company
      - 3 × Fusilier companies
      - Support Weapons Company — Breda M37 machine guns and 45mm mod. 35 mortars
  - 17th Artillery Regiment "Sforzesca"
    - Command Unit
    - I Group
      - 3 × Batteries — 4 × 105/28 cannons per battery
      - Group Ammunition and Supply Unit
    - II Group
      - 3 × Batteries — 4 × 75/18 mod. 35 howitzers per battery
    - III Group
      - 3 × Batteries — 4 × 75/18 mod. 35 howitzers per battery
    - Regimental Ammunition and Supply Unit
    - 53rd Anti-aircraft Battery — 8 × 20/65 mod. 35 anti-aircraft guns
    - 70th Anti-tank Battery — 6 × Pak 97/38 anti-tank guns
    - 302nd Anti-aircraft Battery — 8 × 20/65 mod. 35 anti-aircraft guns
  - II Mortar Battalion — 81mm mod. 35 mortars
  - 2nd Anti-tank Company — 8 × 47/32 anti-tank guns
  - 121st Anti-tank Company — 8 × 47/32 anti-tank guns
  - 2nd Telegraph and Radio Operators Company
  - 16th Engineer Company
  - 8th Searchlight Section
  - 2nd Autocarrette Section
  - 124th Heavy Transport Section
  - 192nd Heavy Transport Section
  - 11th Mobile Auto Workshop - Type 37
  - 6th Medical Section
    - 5th Field Hospital
    - 6th Field Hospital
    - 7th Field Hospital
    - 805th Field Hospital
    - 27th Surgical Unit
  - 1st Supply Section

==== 3rd Infantry Division "Ravenna" ====
- 3rd Infantry Division "Ravenna" — Generale di Divisione Eduardo Nebbia (until 3 October 1942, then Generale di Divisione Francesco Dupont)
  - Headquarters
    - 7th Mixed Carabinieri Section
    - 8th Motorized Carabinieri Section
    - 53rd Field Post Office
    - 3rd Auto Squad for Infantry Division Command
  - 37th Infantry Regiment "Ravenna"
    - Command Company
    - Support Weapons Battery — 65/17 mod. 13 mountain guns
    - Mortar Company — 81mm mod. 35 mortars
    - 3 × Fusilier battalions
      - Command Company
      - 3 × Fusilier companies
      - Support Weapons Company — Breda M37 machine guns and 45mm mod. 35 mortars
  - 38th Infantry Regiment "Ravenna"
    - Command Company
    - Support Weapons Battery — 65/17 mod. 13 mountain guns
    - Mortar Company — 81mm mod. 35 mortars
    - 3 × Fusilier battalions
      - Command Company
      - 3 × Fusilier companies
      - Support Weapons Company — Breda M37 machine guns and 45mm mod. 35 mortars
  - 121st Motorized Artillery Regiment
    - Command Unit
    - I Group
      - 3 × Batteries — 4 × 75/18 mod. 35 howitzers per battery
    - II Group
      - 3 × Batteries — 4 × 75/18 mod. 35 howitzers per battery
    - XXVIII Group
      - 3 × Batteries — 4 × 105/28 cannons per battery
      - Group Ammunition and Supply Unit
    - Regimental Ammunition and Supply Unit
    - 51st Anti-aircraft Battery — 8 × 20/65 mod. 35 anti-aircraft guns
    - 71st Anti-tank Battery — 6 × Pak 97/38 anti-tank guns
    - 303rd Anti-aircraft Battery — 8 × 20/65 mod. 35 anti-aircraft guns
  - III Mortar Battalion — 81mm mod. 35 mortars
  - 3rd Anti-tank Company — 8 × 47/32 anti-tank guns
  - 154th Anti-tank Company — 8 × 47/32 anti-tank guns
  - 3rd Telegraph and Radio Operators Company
  - 18th Engineer Company
  - 10th Searchlight Section
  - 3rd Autocarrette Section
  - 7th Supply Section
  - 128th Heavy Transport Section
  - 247th Heavy Transport Section
  - 12th Mobile Auto Workshop - Type 37
  - 18th Medical Section
    - 16th Field Hospital
    - 201st Field Hospital
    - 202nd Field Hospital
    - 438th Field Hospital
    - 37th Surgical Unit

==== 5th Infantry Division "Cosseria" ====
- 5th Infantry Division "Cosseria" — Generale di Divisione Enrico Gazzale
  - Headquarters
    - 13th Mixed Carabinieri Section
    - 14th Motorized Carabinieri Section
    - 42nd Field Post Office
    - 5th Auto Squad for Infantry Division Command
  - 89th Infantry Regiment "Cosseria"
    - Command Company
    - Support Weapons Battery — 65/17 mod. 13 mountain guns
    - Mortar Company — 81mm mod. 35 mortars
    - 3 × Fusilier battalions
      - Command Company
      - 3 × Fusilier companies
      - Support Weapons Company — Breda M37 machine guns and 45mm mod. 35 mortars
  - 90th Infantry Regiment "Cosseria"
    - Command Company
    - Support Weapons Battery — 65/17 mod. 13 mountain guns
    - Mortar Company — 81mm mod. 35 mortars
    - 3 × Fusilier battalions
      - Command Company
      - 3 × Fusilier companies
      - Support Weapons Company — Breda M37 machine guns and 45mm mod. 35 mortars
  - 108th Artillery Regiment "Cosseria"
    - Command Unit
    - I Group
      - 3 × Batteries — 4 × 75/18 mod. 35 howitzers per battery
    - II Group
      - 3 × Batteries — 4 × 75/18 mod. 35 howitzers per battery
    - IV Group
      - 3 × Batteries — 4 × 105/28 cannons per battery
      - Group Ammunition and Supply Unit
    - Regimental Ammunition and Supply Unit
    - 72nd Anti-tank Battery — 6 × Pak 97/38 anti-tank guns
    - 87th Anti-aircraft Battery — 8 × 20/65 mod. 35 anti-aircraft guns
    - 305th Anti-aircraft Battery — 8 × 20/65 mod. 35 anti-aircraft guns
  - CV Mortar Battalion — 81mm mod. 35 mortars
  - 135th Anti-tank Company — 8 × 47/32 anti-tank guns
  - 355th Anti-tank Company — 8 × 47/32 anti-tank guns
  - 5th Telegraph and Radio Operators Company
  - 23rd Engineer Company
  - 53rd Searchlight Section
  - 5th Autocarrette Section
  - 134th Heavy Transport Section
  - 248th Heavy Transport Section
  - 13th Mobile Auto Workshop - Type 37
  - 47th Medical Section
    - 118th Field Hospital
    - 119th Field Hospital
    - 513th Field Hospital
    - 515th Field Hospital
    - 105th Surgical Unit
  - 48th Supply Section

==== CC.NN. Grouping "23 Marzo" ====
- CC.NN. Grouping "23 Marzo" — Generale di Divisione Enrico Francisci (from November 1942 Generale di Divisione Luigi Martinesi)
  - CC.NN. Battalions Group "Valle Scrivia" — Console Mario Bertoni
    - Command Company
    - V CC.NN. Assault Battalion "Tortona"
    - XXXIV CC.NN. Mountain Battalion "Savona"
    - XLI CC.NN. Support Weapons Battalion "Trento"
  - CC.NN. Battalions Group "Leonessa" — Console Graziano Sardu
    - Command Company
    - XIV CC.NN. Assault Battalion "Bergamo"
    - XV CC.NN. Assault Battalion "Brescia"
    - XXXVIII CC.NN. Support Weapons Battalion "Asti"

=== XXXV Army Corps ===
XXXV Army Corps organization during the campaign in the Soviet Union

- XXXV Army Corps — Generale di Corpo d'Armata Giovanni Messe (until 31 October 1942), Generale Corpo d'Armata Francesco Zingales (from 1 November 1942)
  - XXXV Army Corps Headquarters — Chief of Staff: Colonel Umberto Utili (until 31 October 1942, then from 1 November 1942 Colonel Gaetano Vargas)
    - Photo-cinematographic Unit
    - 193rd Motorized Carabinieri Section
    - 194th Motorized Carabinieri Section
    - 684th Motorized Carabinieri Section
    - 33rd Photo Section
    - 33rd Topographic Section for Artillery
    - 33rd Topographic Section
    - 1st Fuel Section
    - 88th Field Post Office
    - 13th Road Movement Squad
    - 35th Transport Squad for Army Corps Command
  - XXXV Army Corps Infantry
    - II Anti-tank Battalion
      - Command Company
      - 3 × Anti-tank companies — 8 × 47/32 anti-tank guns per company
    - XV Infantry Sappers Battalion
      - Command Platoon
      - 2 × Infantry Sappers companies
    - CIV Army Corps Machine Gunners Battalion (Auto-transported)
      - Command Company
      - 3 × Machine Gunners companies
    - 1st Bersaglieri Motorcyclists Company
  - XXXV Army Corps Artillery — Generale di Brigata Francesco Dupont (from 2 October 1942 Generale di Brigata Adriano Perrod)
    - 30th Army Corps Artillery Grouping
      - LX Group
        - 3 × Batteries — 4 × 105/32 heavy field guns per battery
      - LXI Group
        - 3 × Batteries — 4 × 105/32 heavy field guns per battery
      - LXII Group
        - 3 × Batteries — 4 × 105/32 heavy field guns per battery
      - CXXIV Group
        - 3 × Batteries — 4 × 149/13 heavy howitzers per battery
      - 30th Army Corps Artillery Specialists Unit
      - 95th Anti-aircraft Battery — 8 × 20/65 mod. 35 anti-aircraft guns
      - 97th Anti-aircraft Battery — 8 × 20/65 mod. 35 anti-aircraft guns
  - XXXV Army Corps Engineers — Generale di Brigata Mario Tirelli
    - IV Engineer Battalion
      - Command Company
      - 3 × Engineer companies
    - VIII Connections Battalion
      - 102nd Radio Operators Company
      - 121st Telegraph Operators Company
      - 122nd Telegraph Operators Company
      - 20th Mobile Dovecote
    - 88th Searchlight Section
    - 19th Connections Materiel Repair Workshop
  - XXXV Army Corps Chemical Troops
    - 16th Chemical Company
  - XXXV Army Corps Services
    - 27th Heavy Transport Unit
      - 222nd Heavy Transport Section
      - 223rd Heavy Transport Section
      - 224th Heavy Transport Section
      - 225th Heavy Transport Section
    - 228th Mixed Transport Unit
      - 9th Fuel Tankers Section
      - 11th Fuel Tankers Section
      - 33rd Ambulance Section
      - 118th Mixed Transport Section
    - 15th Heavy Mobile Workshop
    - 1st Special Transport Unit (for the transport the CC.NN. Grouping)
    - 2nd Special Transport Unit (for the transport the CC.NN. Grouping)
    - 5th Materiel Recovery Company
    - 82nd Train Unit (equipped with mules)
    - 87th Supply Section
    - 14th Medical Section
      - 159th Field Hospital
      - 1st Radiological Ambulatory
      - 2nd Radiological Ambulatory
      - 14th Dental Ambulatory
      - 25th Disinfection Section

==== 3rd Cavalry Division "Principe Amedeo Duca d'Aosta" ====
- 3rd Cavalry Division "Principe Amedeo Duca d'Aosta" — Generale di Divisione Mario Marazzani (until 1 November 1942, then from 3 November Generale di Divisione Ettore de Blasio)
  - Headquarters
    - Command Squadron
    - 355th Motorized Carabinieri Section
    - 356th Motorized Carabinieri Section
    - 40th Field Post Office
    - 7th Street Movement Squad
    - 3rd Transport Squad for Cavalry Division Command
  - 3rd Bersaglieri Regiment
    - Command Company
    - 172nd Anti-tank Company — 8 × 47/32 anti-tank guns
    - XVIII Auto-transported Battalion
      - Command Company
      - 3 × Bersaglieri companies
      - Support Weapons Company — Breda M37 machine guns and 45mm mod. 35 mortars
    - XX Auto-transported Battalion
      - Command Company
      - 3 × Bersaglieri companies
      - Support Weapons Company — Breda M37 machine guns and 45mm mod. 35 mortars
    - XXV Auto-transported Battalion
      - Command Company
      - 3 × Bersaglieri companies
      - Support Weapons Company — Breda M37 machine guns and 45mm mod. 35 mortars
  - 6th Bersaglieri Regiment
    - Command Company
    - 173rd Anti-tank Company — 8 × 47/32 anti-tank guns
    - VI Auto-transported Battalion
      - Command Company
      - 3 × Bersaglieri companies
      - Support Weapons Company — Breda M37 machine guns and 45mm mod. 35 mortars
    - XIII Auto-transported Battalion
      - Command Company
      - 3 × Bersaglieri companies
      - Support Weapons Company — Breda M37 machine guns and 45mm mod. 35 mortars
    - XIX Auto-transported Battalion
      - Command Company
      - 3 × Bersaglieri companies
      - Support Weapons Company — Breda M37 machine guns and 45mm mod. 35 mortars
  - 120th Motorized Artillery Regiment
    - Command Unit
    - I Group
      - 3 × Batteries — 4 × 100/17 mod. 14 howitzers per battery
    - II Group
      - 3 × Batteries — 4 × 75/27 mod. 11 field guns per battery
    - III Group
      - 3 × Batteries — 4 × 75/27 mod. 11 field guns per battery
    - Ammunition and Supply Unit
    - 75th Anti-tank Battery — 6 × Pak 97/38 anti-tank guns
    - 93rd Anti-aircraft Battery — 8 × 20/65 mod. 35 anti-aircraft guns
    - 101st Anti-aircraft Battery — 8 × 20/65 mod. 35 anti-aircraft guns
  - XIII Self-propelled Anti-tank Squadrons Group Regiment "Cavalleggeri di Alessandria"
    - Command Platoon
    - 2 × Self-propelled squadrons — L40 47/32 self-propelled guns
  - XLVII Bersaglieri Motorcyclists Battalion
    - Command Platoon
    - 3 × Bersaglieri Motorcyclists companies
  - LXVII Armored Bersaglieri Battalion
    - Command Platoon
    - 2 × Armored Bersaglieri companies — L6/40 tanks
  - IC Mortar Battalion — 81mm mod. 35 mortars
  - 272nd Anti-tank Company — 8 × 47/32 anti-tank guns
  - 103rd Telegraph and Radio Operators Company
  - 105th Engineer Company
  - XIV Heavy Transport Group
    - 122nd Light Transport Unit
    - 213th Mixed Transport Unit
    - 218th Heavy Transport Unit
    - 219th Heavy Transport Unit
  - 3rd Mobile Transport Workshop - Type 37
  - 73rd Medical Section
    - 46th Field Hospital
    - 47th Field Hospital
    - 148th Field Hospital
    - 20th Surgical Unit
  - 93rd Supply Section

==== 9th Infantry Division "Pasubio" ====
- 9th Infantry Division "Pasubio" — Generale di Divisione Vittorio Giovanelli (until 4 December 1942, then Generale di Divisione Guido Boselli)
  - Headquarters
    - Command Company
    - 25th Motorized Carabinieri Section
    - 26th Motorized Carabinieri Section
    - 91st Fuel Section
    - 83rd Field Post Office
    - 8th Street Movement Squad
    - 9th Roadside Assistance Squad
    - 9th Transport Squad for Infantry Division Command
  - 79th Infantry Regiment "Pasubio"
    - Command Company
    - Support Weapons Battery — 65/17 mod. 13 mountain guns
    - Mortar Company — 81mm mod. 35 mortars
    - 3 × Fusilier battalions
      - Command Company
      - 3 × Fusilier companies
      - Support Weapons Company — Breda M37 machine guns and 45mm mod. 35 mortars
  - 80th Infantry Regiment "Pasubio"
    - Command Company
    - Support Weapons Battery — 65/17 mod. 13 mountain guns
    - Mortar Company — 81mm mod. 35 mortars
    - 3 × Fusilier battalions
      - Command Company
      - 3 × Fusilier companies
      - Support Weapons Company — Breda M37 machine guns and 45mm mod. 35 mortars
  - 8th Artillery Regiment "Pasubio"
    - Command Unit
    - I Group
      - 3 × Batteries — 4 × 100/17 mod. 14 howitzers per battery
    - II Group
      - 3 × Batteries — 4 × 75/27 mod. 11 field guns per battery
    - III Group
      - 3 × Batteries — 4 × 75/27 mod. 11 field guns per battery
    - Ammunition and Supply Unit
    - 73rd Anti-tank Battery — 6 × Pak 97/38 anti-tank guns
    - 85th Anti-aircraft Battery — 8 × 20/65 mod. 35 anti-aircraft guns
    - 309th Anti-aircraft Battery — 8 × 20/65 mod. 35 anti-aircraft guns
  - V Mortar Battalion — 81mm mod. 35 mortars (detached from the 5th Infantry Division "Cosseria")
  - IX Mortar Battalion — 81mm mod. 35 mortars
  - 9th Anti-tank Company — 8 × 47/32 anti-tank guns
  - 141st Anti-tank Company — 8 × 47/32 anti-tank guns
  - 9th Telegraph and Radio Operators Company
  - 30th Engineer Company
  - 95th Searchlight Section
  - 190th Heavy Transport Unit
    - 813th Heavy Transport Section
    - 814th Heavy Transport Section
  - 9th Mobile Transport Workshop - Type 37
  - 5th Medical Section
    - 825th Field Hospital
    - 826th Field Hospital
    - 836th Field Hospital
    - 874th Field Hospital
    - 25th Surgical Unit
  - 11th Supply Section

==== 52nd Infantry Division "Torino" ====
- 52nd Infantry Division "Torino" — Generale di Divisione Roberto Lerici
  - Headquarters
    - Command Company
    - 56th Motorized Carabinieri Section
    - 66th Motorized Carabinieri Section
    - 52nd Fuel Section
    - 152nd Field Post Office
    - 5th Street Movement Squad
    - 52nd Roadside Assistance Squad
    - 52nd Transport Squad for Infantry Division Command
  - 81st Infantry Regiment "Torino"
    - Command Company
    - Support Weapons Battery — 65/17 mod. 13 mountain guns
    - Mortar Company — 81mm mod. 35 mortars
    - 3 × Fusilier battalions
      - Command Company
      - 3 × Fusilier companies
      - Support Weapons Company — Breda M37 machine guns and 45mm mod. 35 mortars
  - 82nd Infantry Regiment "Torino"
    - Command Company
    - Support Weapons Battery — 65/17 mod. 13 mountain guns
    - Mortar Company — 81mm mod. 35 mortars
    - 3 × Fusilier battalions
      - Command Company
      - 3 × Fusilier companies
      - Support Weapons Company — Breda M37 machine guns and 45mm mod. 35 mortars
  - 52nd Artillery Regiment "Torino"
    - Command Unit
    - I Group
      - 3 × Batteries — 4 × 100/17 mod. 14 howitzers per battery
    - II Group
      - 3 × Batteries — 4 × 75/27 mod. 11 field guns per battery
    - III Group
      - 3 × Batteries — 4 × 75/27 mod. 11 field guns per battery
    - Ammunition and Supply Unit
    - 74th Anti-tank Battery — 6 × Pak 97/38 anti-tank guns
    - 352nd Anti-aircraft Battery — 8 × 20/65 mod. 35 anti-aircraft guns
    - 361st Anti-aircraft Battery — 8 × 20/65 mod. 35 anti-aircraft guns
  - XXVI Mortar Battalion — 81mm mod. 35 mortars (detached from the 26th Infantry Division "Assietta")
  - LII Mortar Battalion — 81mm mod. 35 mortars
  - 52nd Anti-tank Company — 8 × 47/32 anti-tank guns
  - 171st Anti-tank Company — 8 × 47/32 anti-tank guns
  - 52nd Telegraph and Radio Operators Company
  - 57th Engineer Company
  - 69th Searchlight Section
  - 185th Heavy Transport Unit
    - 815th Heavy Transport Section
    - 834th Heavy Transport Section
  - 52nd Mobile Transport Workshop - Type 37
  - 52nd Medical Section
    - 89th Field Hospital
    - 90th Field Hospital
    - 117th Field Hospital
    - 578th Field Hospital
    - 52nd Surgical Unit
  - 52nd Supply Section

==== CC.NN. Grouping "3 Gennaio" ====
- CC.NN. Grouping "3 Gennaio" — Generale di Divisione Filippo Diamanti
  - CC.NN. Battalions Group "Tagliamento" — Console Nicolò Nicchiarelli (from 1 October 1942 Console Domenico Mittica)
    - Command Company
    - LXIII CC.NN. Mountain Battalion "Udine"
    - LXXIX CC.NN. Assault Battalion "Reggio Emilia"
    - LXIII Support Weapons Battalion (Royal Italian Army)
  - CC.NN. Battalions Group "Montebello" — Console Italo Vianini
    - Command Company
    - VI CC.NN. Assault Battalion "Vigevano"
    - XXX CC.NN. Assault Battalion "Novara"
    - XII CC.NN. Support Weapons Battalion "Aosta"

=== Alpine Army Corps ===
Alpine Army Corps organization during the campaign in the Soviet Union

- Alpine Army Corps — Generale di Corpo d'Armata Gabriele Nasci
  - Alpine Army Corps Headquarters — Chief of Staff: Colonel Giulio Martinat
    - 422nd Carabinieri Section
    - 425th Carabinieri Section
    - 20th Photo Section
    - 20th Telephoto Section
    - 27th Topographic Section
    - 108th Field Post Office
    - Auto Squad for Alpine Army Corps Command
  - Alpine Army Corps Artillery
    - 11th Army Corps Artillery Grouping
      - LI Group
        - 3 × Batteries — 4 × 105/32 heavy field guns per battery
      - LII Group
        - 3 × Batteries — 4 × 105/32 heavy field guns per battery
      - LIII Group
        - 3 × Batteries — 4 × 105/32 heavy field guns per battery
      - CXVII Group
        - 3 × Batteries — 4 × 149/13 heavy howitzers per battery
      - 11th Army Corps Artillery Specialists Unit
      - 39th Anti-aircraft Battery — 8 × 20/65 mod. 35 anti-aircraft guns
      - 41st Anti-aircraft Battery — 8 × 20/65 mod. 35 anti-aircraft guns
  - Alpine Army Corps Engineers
    - I Engineer Battalion
      - 3 × Engineer companies
    - IX Mixed Engineer Battalion
      - 109th Telegraph Operators Company
      - 117th Radio Operators Company
      - 2nd Searchlight Company
      - 19th Mobile Dovecote
    - XXX Sappers Battalion
      - Command Platoon
      - 2 × Sappers companies
    - 21st Connections Materiel Repair Workshop
  - Alpine Army Corps Chemical Troops
    - 1st Chemical Company
  - Alpine Army Corps Services
    - 200th Mixed Transport Unit
      - 129th Mixed Transport Section
      - 727th Heavy Transport Section
      - 728th Heavy Transport Section
      - Autocarrette Section
    - 57th Heavy Mobile Workshop
    - 6th Materiel Recovery Company
    - 113th Alpine Supply Section
    - 307th Medical Section
      - 23rd Field Hospital
      - 24th Field Hospital
      - 466th Field Hospital
      - 467th Field Hospital
      - 483rd Field Hospital
      - 484th Field Hospital
      - 7th Dental Ambulatory
      - 9th Disinfection Section

==== 2nd Alpine Division "Tridentina" ====
- 2nd Alpine Division "Tridentina" — Generale di Brigata Luigi Reverberi
  - Headquarters
    - Command Company
    - 402nd Carabinieri Section
    - 417th Carabinieri Section
    - 201st Field Post Office
    - 2nd Alpine Division Command Transport Squad
  - 5th Alpini Regiment
    - Command Company
    - Alpini Battalion "Morbegno"
      - Command Company
      - 3 × Alpini companies
      - 107th Support Weapons Company — Breda M37 machine guns, 45mm mod. 35 and 81mm mod. 35 mortars
    - Alpini Battalion "Tirano"
      - Command Company
      - 3 × Alpini companies
      - 109th Support Weapons Company — Breda M37 machine guns, 45mm mod. 35 and 81mm mod. 35 mortars
    - Alpini Battalion "Edolo"
      - Command Company
      - 3 × Alpini companies
      - 110th Support Weapons Company — Breda M37 machine guns, 45mm mod. 35 and 81mm mod. 35 mortars
    - 82nd Cannons Company — 8 × 47/32 anti-tank guns
    - 5th Medical Section
      - 618th Field Hospital
    - 5th Supply Section
    - 25th Train Section (equipped with mules)
  - 6th Alpini Regiment
    - Command Company
    - Alpini Battalion "Vestone"
      - Command Company
      - 3 × Alpini companies
      - 111th Support Weapons Company — Breda M37 machine guns, 45mm mod. 35 and 81mm mod. 35 mortars
    - Alpini Battalion "Val Chiese"
      - Command Company
      - 3 × Alpini companies
      - 112th Support Weapons Company — Breda M37 machine guns, 45mm mod. 35 and 81mm mod. 35 mortars
    - Alpini Battalion "Verona"
      - Command Company
      - 3 × Alpini companies
      - 113th Support Weapons Company — Breda M37 machine guns, 45mm mod. 35 and 81mm mod. 35 mortars
    - 216th Cannons Company — 8 × 47/32 anti-tank guns
    - 6th Medical Section
      - 621st Field Hospital
    - 6th Supply Section
    - 26th Train Section (equipped with mules)
  - 2nd Alpine Artillery Regiment "Tridentina"
    - Command Unit
    - Group "Bergamo"
      - 3 × Batteries — 4 × 75/13 mod. 15 mountain guns per battery
      - Ammunition and Supply Unit
    - Group "Vicenza"
      - 3 × Batteries — 4 × 75/13 mod. 15 mountain guns per battery
      - Ammunition and Supply Unit
    - Group "Val Camonica"
      - 2 × Batteries — 4 × 105/11 mod. 28 mountain guns per battery
      - Ammunition and Supply Unit
    - 56th Anti-aircraft Battery — 8 × 20/65 mod. 35 anti-aircraft guns
    - 59th Anti-aircraft Battery — 8 × 20/65 mod. 35 anti-aircraft guns
    - 76th Anti-tank Battery — 6 × Pak 97/38 anti-tank guns
  - II Mixed Engineer Battalion
    - 112th Telegraph and Radio Operators Company
    - 122nd Engineer Company
    - 102nd Searchlight Section
  - 5th Train Unit (equipped with mules)
  - 206th Mixed Transport Unit
    - 126th Mixed Transport Section
    - 721st Heavy Transport Section
    - 722nd Heavy Transport Section
    - 946th Heavy Transport Section
    - Fuel Tankers Section
  - 302nd Medical Section
    - 619th Field Hospital
    - 620th Field Hospital
    - 622nd Field Hospital
    - 623rd Field Hospital
  - 110th Supply Section
  - 61st Bakers Section

==== 3rd Alpine Division "Julia" ====
- 3rd Alpine Division "Julia" — Generale di Brigata Umberto Ricagno
  - Headquarters
    - Command Company
    - 415th Carabinieri Section
    - 416th Carabinieri Section
    - 202nd Field Post Office
    - 3rd Alpine Division Command Transport Squad
  - 8th Alpini Regiment
    - Command Company
    - Alpini Battalion "Tolmezzo"
      - Command Company
      - 3 × Alpini companies
      - 114th Support Weapons Company — Breda M37 machine guns, 45mm mod. 35 and 81mm mod. 35 mortars
    - Alpini Battalion "Cividale"
      - Command Company
      - 3 × Alpini companies
      - 115th Support Weapons Company — Breda M37 machine guns, 45mm mod. 35 and 81mm mod. 35 mortars
    - Alpini Battalion "Gemona"
      - Command Company
      - 3 × Alpini companies
      - 116th Support Weapons Company — Breda M37 machine guns, 45mm mod. 35 and 81mm mod. 35 mortars
    - 41st Cannons Company — 8 × 47/32 anti-tank guns
    - 308th Medical Section
      - 814th Field Hospital
    - 8th Supply Section
    - 28th Train Section (equipped with mules)
  - 9th Alpini Regiment
    - Command Company
    - Alpini Battalion "Vicenza"
      - Command Company
      - 3 × Alpini companies
      - 117th Support Weapons Company — Breda M37 machine guns, 45mm mod. 35 and 81mm mod. 35 mortars
    - Alpini Battalion "Val Cismon"
      - Command Company
      - 3 × Alpini companies
      - 118th Support Weapons Company — Breda M37 machine guns, 45mm mod. 35 and 81mm mod. 35 mortars
    - Alpini Battalion "L'Aquila"
      - Command Company
      - 3 × Alpini companies
      - 119th Support Weapons Company — Breda M37 machine guns, 45mm mod. 35 and 81mm mod. 35 mortars
    - 83rd Cannons Company — 8 × 47/32 anti-tank guns
    - 309th Medical Section
      - 630th Field Hospital
    - 9th Supply Section
    - 29th Train Section (equipped with mules)
  - 3rd Alpine Artillery Regiment "Julia"
    - Command Unit
    - Group "Conegliano"
      - 3 × Batteries — 4 × 75/13 mod. 15 mountain guns per battery
      - Ammunition and Supply Unit
    - Group "Udine"
      - 3 × Batteries — 4 × 75/13 mod. 15 mountain guns per battery
      - Ammunition and Supply Unit
    - Group "Val Piave"
      - 3 × Batteries — 4 × 105/11 mod. 28 mountain guns per battery
      - Ammunition and Supply Unit
    - 45th Anti-aircraft Battery — 8 × 20/65 mod. 35 anti-aircraft guns
    - 47th Anti-aircraft Battery — 8 × 20/65 mod. 35 anti-aircraft guns
    - 77th Anti-tank Battery — 6 × Pak 97/38 anti-tank guns
  - III Mixed Engineer Battalion
    - 113th Telegraph and Radio Operators Company
    - 123rd Engineer Company
    - 103rd Searchlight Section
  - 8th Train Unit (equipped with mules)
  - 207th Mixed Transport Unit
    - 127th Mixed Transport Section
    - 725th Heavy Transport Section
    - 726th Heavy Transport Section
    - 950th Heavy Transport Section
    - Fuel Tankers Section
  - 303rd Medical Section
    - 628th Field Hospital
    - 629th Field Hospital
    - 633rd Field Hospital
    - 813th Field Hospital
  - 111th Supply Section
  - 62nd Bakers Section

==== 4th Alpine Division "Cuneense" ====
- 4th Alpine Division "Cuneense" — Generale di Divisione Emilio Battisti
  - Headquarters
    - Command Company
    - 413th Carabinieri Section
    - 414th Carabinieri Section
    - 203rd Field Post Office
    - 4th Alpine Division Command Transport Squad
  - 1st Alpini Regiment
    - Command Company
    - Alpini Battalion "Ceva"
      - Command Company
      - 3 × Alpini companies
      - 101st Support Weapons Company — Breda M37 machine guns, 45mm mod. 35 and 81mm mod. 35 mortars
    - Alpini Battalion "Pieve di Teco"
      - Command Company
      - 3 × Alpini companies
      - 102nd Support Weapons Company — Breda M37 machine guns, 45mm mod. 35 and 81mm mod. 35 mortars
    - Alpini Battalion "Mondovì"
      - Command Company
      - 3 × Alpini companies
      - 103rd Support Weapons Company — Breda M37 machine guns, 45mm mod. 35 and 81mm mod. 35 mortars
    - 84th Cannons Company — 8 × 47/32 anti-tank guns
    - 1st Medical Section
      - 612th Field Hospital
    - 1st Supply Section
    - 21st Train Section (equipped with mules)
  - 2nd Alpini Regiment
    - Command Company
    - Alpini Battalion "Borgo San Dalmazzo"
      - Command Company
      - 3 × Alpini companies
      - 104th Support Weapons Company — Breda M37 machine guns, 45mm mod. 35 and 81mm mod. 35 mortars
    - Alpini Battalion "Dronero"
      - Command Company
      - 3 × Alpini companies
      - 105th Support Weapons Company — Breda M37 machine guns, 45mm mod. 35 and 81mm mod. 35 mortars
    - Alpini Battalion "Saluzzo"
      - Command Company
      - 3 × Alpini companies
      - 106th Support Weapons Company — Breda M37 machine guns, 45mm mod. 35 and 81mm mod. 35 mortars
    - 14th Cannons Company — 8 × 47/32 anti-tank guns
    - 2nd Medical Section
      - 615th Field Hospital
    - 2nd Supply Section
    - 22nd Train Section (equipped with mules)
  - 4th Alpine Artillery Regiment "Cuneense"
    - Command Unit
    - Group "Pinerolo"
      - 3 × Batteries — 4 × 75/13 mod. 15 mountain guns per battery
      - Ammunition and Supply Unit
    - Group "Mondovì"
      - 3 × Batteries — 4 × 75/13 mod. 15 mountain guns per battery
      - Ammunition and Supply Unit
    - Group "Val Po"
      - 2 × Batteries — 4 × 105/11 mod. 28 mountain guns per battery
      - Ammunition and Supply Unit
    - 64th Anti-aircraft Battery — 8 × 20/65 mod. 35 anti-aircraft guns
    - 78th Anti-tank Battery — 6 × Pak 97/38 anti-tank guns
    - 116th Anti-aircraft Battery — 8 × 20/65 mod. 35 anti-aircraft guns
  - IV Mixed Engineer Battalion
    - 114th Telegraph and Radio Operators Company
    - 124th Engineer Company
    - 104th Searchlight Section
  - 2nd Train Unit (equipped with mules)
  - 201st Mixed Transport Unit
    - 121st Mixed Transport Section
    - 701st Heavy Transport Section
    - 702nd Heavy Transport Section
    - 947th Heavy Transport Section
    - Fuel Tankers Section
  - 306th Medical Section
    - 613th Field Hospital
    - 614th Field Hospital
    - 616th Field Hospital
    - 617th Field Hospital
  - 107th Supply Section
  - 63rd Bakers Section

=== 8th Army Services ===
- 8th Army Services — Generale di Brigata Carlo Biglino
  - Administrative Directorate
  - Artillery Directorate
    - 8th Artillery Depot
  - Engineer Directorate
    - 8th Engineer Depot
    - 33rd Engineer Company
  - Chemical Directorate
    - 8th Chemical Depot
    - Chemical Field Laboratory
  - Horse and Veterinary Directorate
    - 8th Veterinary and Farriery Depot
    - Quadrupeds harness Depot
    - Quadrupeds infirmaries: 2nd, 3rd, 6th, 13th, 17th, 120th, 121st
  - Automobilistic Directorate
    - 6th Automobile Motor Pool
    - 7th Automobile Motor Pool
    - 6 × Workshops for Auto Groups
    - 1 × Special FIAT workshops
  - Post and Telegraph Directorate
    - Field post offices: 6th, 57th, 89th, 90th, 102nd, 113th, 116th, 117th, 122nd, 126th, 127th, 128th, 129th, 147th
  - Recovery Directorate
    - 7th Materiel Recovery Company
  - Road Directorate
  - War Economy Directorate
  - Timber Directorate
    - Forestry companies: 91st, 131st, 133rd

==== Medical Service ====
- Medical Directorate
  - 8th Medical Depot
  - Field hospitals: 25th, 32nd, 40th, 42nd, 44th, 52nd, 60th, 64th, 93rd, 159th, 163rd, 164th, 211th, 235th, 238th, 239th, 248th, 249th, 250th, 251st, 256th, 257th, 311th, 463rd, 512th, 514th, 566th, 567th, 820th, 827th, 828th, 829th, 830th, 831st, 832nd, 837th, 873rd
  - Reserve hospitals: 1st, 2nd, 3rd, 6th, 7th, 8th
  - 1st Convalescence hospitals: 1st, 2nd
  - 252nd Mixed Carabinieri Section
  - 2nd Gassed Personnel Cleaning Section
  - 104th Gassed Personnel Cleaning Section
  - 22nd Disinfection Section
  - 31st Disinfection Section
  - Chemical, Bacteriological, Toxicological Laboratory
  - Hospital Trains:
    - Royal Italian Army: 3rd, 5th, 6th, 7th, 10th, 12th, 23rd, 24th, 35th, 36th, 41st
    - Italian Red Cross: 13th, 14th, 15th, 16th, 17th, 18th
    - Sovereign Military Order of Malta: 1st, 4th

==== Quartermaster Service ====
- Quartermaster Directorate
  - 8th Supply and Oats Depot
  - 8th Fodder, Straw and Wood Depot
  - 8th Clothing and Equipment Depot
  - 1st Butcher Company
  - Supply sections: 57th, 84th, 96th, 97th
  - 175th Bakers Section with drivable ovens
  - Baker sections without mobile ovens: 166th, 169th, 171st, 176th, 181sy, 191st
  - Baker sections with rotatable ovens: 6th, 8th, 19th, 28th
  - Baker squads with rotatable ovens: 2nd, 23rd, 26th, 49th, 53rd, 59th, 65th, 104th
  - 1st Mixed Bakers Squad

==== Transport Service ====
- Transport Directorate
  - 2nd Army Auto Grouping
    - 46th Auto Workshop
    - 8th Roadside Assistance Unit
    - II Mixed Auto Group
      - 26th Heavy Auto Unit
        - Heavy Transport Sections: 251st, 252nd, 253rd, 254th
      - 91st Heavy Auto Unit
        - Heavy Transport Sections: 541st, 542nd, 543rd, 544th
      - 51st Ambulance Auto Unit
        - Ambulance sections: 23rd, 37th, 54th, 73rd, 74th
      - 32nd Fuel Trucks Auto Unit
        - Fuel trucks sections: 132nd, 217th, 219th, 277th, 278th
      - Auto Workshop (detached from the 116th Light Auto Unit)
    - XXIX Heavy Auto Group
      - 34th Heavy Auto Unit
        - Heavy Transport Sections: 283rd, 284th, 285th, 286th
      - 97th Heavy Auto Unit
        - Heavy Transport Sections: 565th, 566th, 567th, 568th
      - 115th Heavy Auto Unit
        - Heavy Transport Sections: 733rd, 734th, 735th, 736th
      - 139th Mixed Auto Unit
        - Light Transport Sections: 74th, 75th
        - Heavy Transport Sections: 766th, 767th
      - Auto Workshop (detached from the 33rd Heavy Auto Unit)
      - Auto Workshop (detached from the 96th Heavy Auto Unit)
    - LI Heavy Auto Group
      - 25th Heavy Auto Unit
        - Heavy Transport Sections: 715th, 716th, 717th, 718th
      - 127th Heavy Auto Unit
        - 110th Mixed Transport Sections
        - Heavy Transport Sections: 749th, 750th, 751st, 752nd, 813th
      - 187th Heavy Auto Unit
        - Heavy Transport Sections: 801st, 802nd, 803rd, 804th
      - 188th Heavy Auto Unit
        - Heavy Transport Sections: 805th, 806th, 807th, 888th
      - Auto Workshop (detached from the 135th Heavy Auto Unit)
      - Auto Workshop (detached from the 140th Heavy Auto Unit)
  - 7th Army Auto Grouping
    - 7th Auto Workshop
    - XVIII Heavy Auto Group
      - 29th Heavy Auto Unit
        - Heavy Transport Sections: 263rd, 264th, 265th, 266th
      - 117th Heavy Auto Unit
        - Heavy Transport Sections: 741st, 742nd, 843rd, 844th
      - 126th Heavy Auto Unit
        - Heavy Transport Sections: 54th, 745th, 746th, 747th, 748th
      - 129th Heavy Auto Unit
        - Heavy Transport Sections: 753rd, 754th, 755th, 756th
    - XXX Heavy Auto Group
      - 165th Heavy Auto Unit
        - Heavy Transport Sections: 651st, 652nd, 665th, 666th
      - 241st Heavy Auto Unit
        - Heavy Transport Sections: 1st, 2nd, 3rd, 4th
      - 242nd Heavy Auto Unit
        - Heavy Transport Sections: 15th, 16th, 17th, 18th
      - 134th Ambulance Auto Unit
        - Ambulance sections: 761st, 762nd, 763rd, 764th
  - 8th Army Auto Grouping
    - 8th Auto Workshop
    - LVII Heavy Auto Group
      - 243rd Heavy Auto Unit
        - Heavy Transport Sections: 910th, 911th, 912th, 913th
      - 244th Heavy Auto Unit
        - Heavy Transport Sections: 914th, 915th, 916th, 917th
      - 245th Heavy Auto Unit
        - Heavy Transport Sections: 918th, 919th, 920th, 921st
      - 246th Heavy Auto Unit
        - Heavy Transport Sections: 922nd, 923rd, 924th, 925th
    - LVIII Heavy Auto Group
      - 247th Heavy Auto Unit
        - Heavy Transport Sections: 926th, 927th, 928th, 929th
      - 248th Heavy Auto Unit
        - Heavy Transport Sections: 930th, 931st, 932nd, 933rd
      - 249th Heavy Auto Unit
        - Heavy Transport Sections: 934th, 935th, 936th, 937th
      - 250th Heavy Auto Unit
        - Heavy Transport Sections: 938th, 939th, 940th, 941st
  - 10th Army Auto Grouping
    - 10th Auto Workshop
    - LX Heavy Auto Group
      - 251st Heavy Auto Unit
        - Heavy Transport Sections: 953rd, 954th, 955th, 956th
      - 252nd Heavy Auto Unit
        - Heavy Transport Sections: 957th, 958th, 959th, 960th
      - 253rd Heavy Auto Unit
        - Heavy Transport Sections: 961st, 962nd, 963rd, 964th
      - 254th Heavy Auto Unit
        - Heavy Transport Sections: 965th, 966th, 967th, 968th
    - LXI Heavy Auto Group
      - 255th Heavy Auto Unit
        - Heavy Transport Sections: 969th, 970th, 971st, 972nd
      - 256th Heavy Auto Unit
        - Heavy Transport Sections: 973rd, 974th, 975th, 976th
      - 257th Heavy Auto Unit
        - Heavy Transport Sections: 977th, 978th, 979th, 980th
      - 258th Heavy Auto Unit
        - Heavy Transport Sections: 981st, 982nd, 983rd, 984th
  - VI Road Movement Battalion
    - Command Company
    - 3x Road movement companies
    - Roadside Assistance Unit
  - XXVI Road Movement Battalion
    - Command Company
    - 3x Road movement companies
    - Roadside Assistance Unit
  - 350th Heavy Auto Unit
    - 2x Heavy Transport Sections
  - 6th Road Militia Company
  - 8th Road Militia Company

==== Rear Areas ====
- Rear Areas Directorate
  - 3x Principal rear area commands
  - 6x Secondary rear area commands
  - 11x Special rear area commands
  - 4x Principal rear area office
  - Mobile territorial battalions with 4x Companies: CCXV, CCXVII, CCXLVII, CCXLI
  - Mobile territorial battalions with 3x Companies: CCXVIII, CDL, CDLIV
  - Dismounted artillery groups with 4x batteries (without artillery pieces): CCIX, CDXLIX, CDLI, CDLII, CDLIII, CDLV, CDLVI, CDLVII
  - 63rd Garrison Company
  - 249th Mixed Carabinieri Section
  - 250th Mixed Carabinieri Section
