= 356th Carabinieri Section =

356th Celere Section
- 356ª Sezione Celere
- Active: 1939 - 1943
- Country: Kingdom of Italy
- Branch: Royal Italian Army
- Role: Military police
- Size: 65 troops
- Part of: 3rd Cavalry Division "Principe Amedeo Duca d'Aosta"
- Engagements: Balkans campaign Eastern Front

Commanders
- Notable commanders: S.TEN. Enzo Anceschi

The 356th Celere Section of the Royal Carabinieri (Italian: 356ª Sezione Celere CC.RR.) was an Italian Royal Carabinieri military police unit during World War II. The unit served within the 3rd Cavalry Division "Principe Amedeo Duca d'Aosta" on the Eastern Front for the whole duration of the campaign.

== History ==
Since September 1939, within the general framework of mobilization of the Armed Forces, the Royal Carabinieri had been called upon to establish a certain number of sections to be put into service within the Formations of the Royal Italian Army. The sections were created to carry out the institutional and military police tasks within the fighting units and formations.

The Royal Carabinieri mobilized around 4,000 men for the Eastern Front, distributed in 45 Sections made up of about 65 men each (7/8 subofficers and around 60 troops), led by junior officers (second lieutenants or lieutenants) integrated into the various army commands, army corps, headquarters and division commands of the Royal Italian Army.

Each Section was equipped with Fiat-SPA 38R trucks and Benelli 250 motorcycles.

For each division command there were two CC.RR Sections, one for the divisional command and the other for the divisional Regiments. The 356th Celere Section CC.RR and the 171st were assigned to the 3rd Cavalry Division. Later, the 171st Section was replaced by the 355th Section. The overall commander of divisional Carabinieri was Captain Raffaele Aversa.

=== Establishment and early operations ===
The 356th Section was formed by the Carabinieri Verona Legion on 15 December 1939. Placed under the command of Lieutenant Alfredo Vituzzi, it was based in Verona until June 1940. In middle June 1940, it was transferred to Chiusa di Pesio, and, following the 3rd Cavalry Division, was moved to Cividale del Friuli on 7 July. Between April and the first days of July 1941, the Section was deployed in Bihać, taking part in the operations of the Balkans campaign, then returning to Verona.

=== March to the Eastern Front ===
On the night of 23 July 1941, the Section left for Eastern Europe from Verona to be deployed on the Russian front, always following the 3rd Cavalry Division. The march to reach the Eastern Front lasted more than a month. In the late afternoon of 26 July the Section arrived in Borša, and then reached Gura Humorului, to attend the arrival of the Division. Together with its parent Formation, the Section moved to various locations in Romania from 6 to 20 August. After a few days necessary for the reorganization, on 29 August, the 356th Section left Lissaja Gora to reach the Russian city of Adschanka traveling about 140 kilometers by train.

In the following month of September, the 356th Section moved to Mogila Osstraja, following the tactical command of the Division Headquarters. The 3rd Division was entrusted with the defence of a stretch of the front line of approximately 45 kilometres. At the beginning of October, having crossed the Dnieper, the Section reached Sciwotilowka on 5 October and Bolschaj Senissoj on 16 of the same month, after crossing Nikolayevka.

On 21 October a task force of 30 men belonging to both 356th and 355th Sections, together with other divisional troops pushed to Yossovo where the railway station serving Stalino was located. Five days later they were joined by the rest of the remaining personnel of the 356th Section. Until 13 November 1941, the 356th Section was located in Orlovka, then in Olkovicik and, from 26 October, in Kotik.

In October, Lieutenant Alfredo Vituzzi was promoted and handed over command to Second Lieutenant Enzo Anceschi. In the winter months between 1941 and 1942, the Section moved between the inhabited centers of Voroshilovgrad, Ueskow and Kusmenkov, in the bend of the Don, and the resumption of the bloodiest fighting saw the unit engaged in the battles of Faschiewka, Prerowenski, Schinkitow and Millerovo.

During these months, the 356th Section operated in order to counter dispersion of troops during intense fighting.

=== The tide turns ===
Between 4 and 8 December 1942, a good part of the Section's staff was again replaced by 50 soldiers who had left Bologna a few days earlier. The replaced personnel returned to Verona in January 1943. Shortly afterwards, in the second half of December 1942, the front was breached by Soviet forces. To avoid encirclement and capture, the Section participated in the bitter and bloody fighting together with the line units of the Royal Italian Army. The 356th was used as a line unit in Meschkoff together with the Croatian Light Transport Brigade and the 3rd Bersaglieri Regiment.

The greater part of the 356th Section reached Kamensk, while a group of 12 carabinieri found themselves incorporated into a company of volunteers formed in Millerovo, in a precarious and desperate attempt to reorganize the surviving forces. From the end of December 1942 to mid-January 1943 the soldiers of the Italian Volunteer Company of Millerovo resisted in a trench, which on 17 January they abandoned together with the German troops to try to open a gap in the Soviet lines who were surrounding and besieging the city. The fighting was fierce and bloody. Twenty-one Carabinieri of the 356th Section, almost a third of the authorised strength, fell or went missing. Only thanks to the intervention of Italian and German armoured vehicles it was possible to break the encirclement and open a passage to reach Voroshilovgrad. From Voroshilovgrad, after three days of forced marching, they reunited with the rest of the 356th Section in Korssunj.

=== Retreat and disestablishment ===
The 356th Section reached Dnipropetrovsk on 24 January 1943. In February 1943, the Section moved to Gomel. In late March, the 356th Section moved to Babruysk and then to Brest Litovsk. There, they moved by train toward Vienna and arrived on 30 March in Udine. Returned to Verona, the 356th Section was disestablished and its troops assigned to territorial police services.

=== Reestablishment and dissolution ===
On 16 July 1943, the Section was reestablished and its carabinieri were recalled to its ranks. On 13 August the unit reached Imola, where other units of the 3rd Cavalry Division were being concentrated, settling in barracks. After settling in Imola, Second Lieutenant Anceschi handed over command to Marshal Major Luigi Uberti.

Following the Italian capitulation, the 356th Celere Section of the Royal Carabinieri was definitively dissolved.

== List of commanders ==
The 356th Celere Section of the Royal Carabinieri was led, through its history, by three commanders:

- TEN. Alfredo Vituzzi (1939-1941)
- S.TEN. Enzo Anceschi (1941 - 1942)
- MAR.MAGG. Luigi Uberti (1943)

== Individual decorations ==
Out of 203 carabinieri who were part of the 356th Celere Section of the Royal Carabinieri, some were decorated for their actions during their service within the unit. Two carabinieri (Enzo Anceschi and Ignazio Mangiafico) were solemnly commendated and there were 14 promotions in rank for war merit.

=== Bronze Medal of Military Valor ===
Ribbon bar of the Bronze Medal of Military Valor

Two members of the 356th Celere Section were awarded the Bronze Medal of Military Valor:

- S.TEN. Enzo Anceschi
- CAR. Orazio Frasson

=== War merit cross ===
Ribbon bar for the War Merit Cross

Three members of the 356th Celere Section were awarded the War Merit Cross:

- MAR. Enzo Bianchini
- CAR. Ugo Focarelli
- CAR. Giovanni Pinochi

=== Promotions in rank for war merit ===
For actions performed during the campaign, 14 Carabinieri were promoted for merits:

2 August 1942

- CAR. Nicolò Haller promoted to Appuntato
- CAR. Giuseppe Gasparet promoted to Appuntato
- CAR. Ottorino Lambertini promoted to Appuntato
- CAR. Fortunato Romagnoli promoted to Appuntato
- CAR. Eusebio Lilliu promoted to Appuntato
- CAR. Antonio Malecore promoted to Appuntato
- CAR. Giuseppe Granieri promoted to Appuntato

20 August to 1 September 1942

- APP. Michelangelo Stradiotto promoted to Vicebrigadiere
- CAR. Michelangelo Scavo promoted to Appuntato
- CAR. Giuseppe Gallo promoted to Appuntato
- CAR. Francesco Blazic promoted to Appuntato
- CAR. Natale Garofolin promoted to Appuntato
- CAR. Ettore Ghion promoted to Appuntato
- CAR. Paolino Giovinazzi promoted to Appuntato

== See also ==
- 3rd Cavalry Division "Principe Amedeo Duca d'Aosta"
