= Mario Marazzani =

Italian general

- Born: 28 July 1887; Vercelli, Kingdom of Italy
- Died: 15 January 1969 (aged 81); Novara, Italy
- Military career
- Allegiance: Kingdom of Italy; Italy
- Branch: Royal Italian Army; Italian Army
- Service years: 1908–1955
- Rank: Lieutenant General
- Commands: "Piemonte Reale" Cavalry Regiment; 3rd Cavalry Division Principe Amedeo Duca d'Aosta; 3rd Territorial Defence Command; Milan Army Corps
- Conflicts: World War I; Italian Front; World War II; Axis invasion of Yugoslavia; Italian campaign on the Eastern Front; Italian occupation of France
- Awards: Bronze Medal of Military Valor; War Merit Cross (twice); Military Order of Savoy; Order of the Crown of Italy; Order of Merit of the Italian Republic

Mario Marazzani (Vercelli, 28 July 1887 – Novara, 15 January 1969) was an Italian general during World War II. After the war he became first aide-de-camp to the President of the Italian Republic.

== Biography ==
Born in Piedmont, he attended the Military Academy of Modena, graduating in 1908 as cavalry second lieutenant, assigned to the "Lancers of Novara" Cavalry Regiment. During the First World War he distinguished himself on the Pasubio, earning a Bronze Medal of Military Valor; in the postwar period he attended the Army War School and from 1928 to 1932 he taught military history at the same War School. Between 1933 and 1937 he was military attaché in Poland, Latvia, Estonia and Finland, and in 1937, having returned to Italy, he assumed command of the "Piemonte Reale" Cavalry Regiment. In 1939 he was made honorary aide-de-camp to King Victor Emmanuel III. After promotion to brigadier general in August 1939, he became deputy commander of the 3rd Cavalry Division Principe Amedeo Duca d'Aosta on the following September, and on 10 June 1940, the day of Italy’s entry into the Second World War, he assumed command of the Division, replacing General Giovanni Messe.

Marazzani led the division in the invasion of Yugoslavia in April 1941 and then on the Eastern Front from July 1941 to November 1942, when he was replaced by General Ettore De Blasio; on 28 April 1942 he was promoted to major general for war merit, and in November he was awarded the Military Order of Savoy. After returning to Italy he was attached to the Fourth Army from November 1942 to April 1943 and to the Ministry of War from April to June, after which he was appointed inspector of cavalry troops. After the armistice of Cassibile in September 1943 and the German occupation of Italy he went into hiding until April 1945; after the liberation he resumed service and was assigned to the Ministry of War. In 1947 he became commander of the 3rd Territorial Defence Command and the Milan Army Corps, and in May 1948 he was appointed first aide-de-camp to the President of the Republic Luigi Einaudi, being promoted to Lieutenant General on the following August. In 1955 he was transferred to the Army reserve, receiving a letter of thanks from the President of the Republic for his seven years as a military adviser; he was also awarded the Order of Merit of the Italian Republic. He died in Novara on 15 January 1969.
