= Christmas battle =

Christmas battle may refer to:

- Christmas Battles – Battles on the Eastern Front of WWI (1916−1917)
- Christmas Battle (1941) – Battle in World War II (1941−1942)
- Battle of Christmas Island – 1942 battle in the Pacific during WWII (1942)

== See also ==
- Christmas controversies – Christmas ideological, political and religious disputes; commonly associated with the phrase "War on Christmas"
- Christmas Offensive – Battle of the Second Italo-Ethiopian War (1935−1936)
- Christmas Rebellion (disambiguation)
- Christmas War, an alternative name for the Agacher Strip War (1985)
