= 120th Motorized Artillery Regiment =

Inactive Italian Army artillery unit

- 120° Reggimento Artiglieria Motorizzato
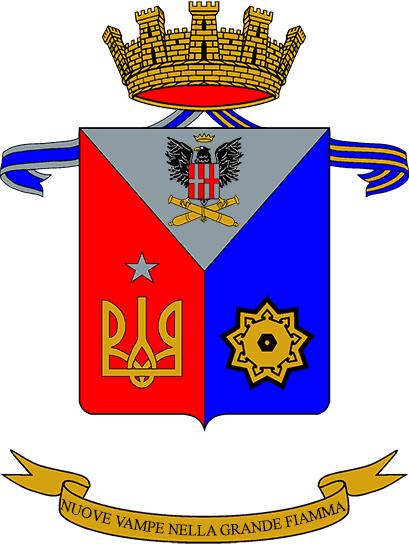
- Regimental coat of arms
- Active: 15 Aug. 1941 — 8 Sept. 1943; 1 Oct. 1975 — 31 March 1991
- Country: Italy
- Branch: Italian Army
- Type: Artillery
- Role: Field artillery
- Part of: Armored Brigade "Pozzuolo del Friuli"
- Garrison/HQ: Palmanova
- Motto: "Nuove vampe nella grande fiamma"
- Anniversaries: 15 June 1918 - Second Battle of the Piave River
- Decorations: 1x Silver Medal of Military Valor; 1x Bronze Medal of Army Valor

Insignia
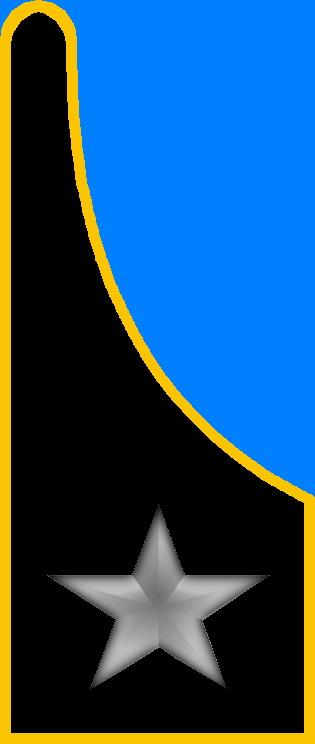
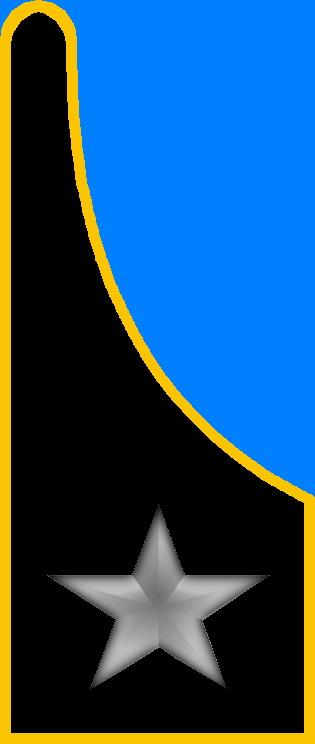
- Regimental gorget patches

The 120th Motorized Artillery Regiment (Italian: 120° Reggimento Artiglieria Motorizzato) is an inactive field artillery regiment of the Italian Army, which was based in Palmanova in Friuli-Venezia Giulia. Originally an artillery regiment of the Royal Italian Army, the regiment was assigned in World War II to the 3rd Cavalry Division "Principe Amedeo Duca d'Aosta", with which the regiment was deployed to the Eastern Front, where division and regiment were destroyed during Operation Little Saturn. The unit was reformed in 1975 and disbanded 1991. The regimental anniversary falls, as for all Italian Army artillery regiments, on June 15, the beginning of the Second Battle of the Piave River in 1918.

== History ==
=== World War II ===
On 15 August 1941 the depot of the 20th Artillery Regiment "Piave" in Padua formed the 120th Motorized Artillery Regiment. The regiment consisted of a command, a command unit, the I Group with 100/17 mod. 14 howitzers, and the II and III groups with 75/27 mod. 11 field guns. The regiment also received the 220th Anti-aircraft Battery with 20/65 mod. 35 anti-aircraft guns. On 15 March 1942 the regiment was assigned to the 3rd Cavalry Division "Principe Amedeo Duca d'Aosta", which also included the 3rd Bersaglieri Regiment and 6th Bersaglieri Regiment. The division was part of the Italian Expeditionary Corps in Russia, which in July 1942 entered the Italian 8th Army. On 16 December 1942 the Red Army commenced Operation Little Saturn, which destroyed most of the Italian 8th Army. The remnants of the 120th Motorized Artillery Regiment were repatriated in April 1943.

For its conduct in the Soviet Union the regiment was awarded a Silver Medal of Military Valor, which was affixed to the regiment's flag and is depicted on the regiment's coat of arms. The regiment was still in the process of being rebuilt when it was disbanded by invading German forces after the announcement of the Armistice of Cassibile on 8 September 1943.

=== Cold War ===
During the 1975 army reform the army disbanded the regimental level and newly independent battalions and groups were granted for the first time their own flags. On 30 September 1975 the 8th Self-propelled Field Artillery Regiment of the Cavalry Brigade "Pozzuolo del Friuli" was disbanded and the next day the regiment's I Self-propelled Field Artillery Group in Visco was reorganized and renamed 120th Self-propelled Field Artillery Group "Po". The group was named for the Po river, which had already lent its name to the 8th Motorized Division "Po", which was active from 1934 to 1939. The group was assigned to the Armored Brigade "Pozzuolo del Friuli" and consisted of a command, a command and services battery, and three batteries with M109G 155 mm self-propelled howitzers.

After its formation the group moved from Visco to Palmanova. On 12 November 1976 the group was assigned the flag and traditions of the 120th Motorized Artillery Regiment by decree 846 of the President of the Italian Republic Giovanni Leone. At the time the group fielded 477 men (38 officers, 62 non-commissioned officers, and 377 soldiers).

For its conduct and work after the 1976 Friuli earthquake the group was awarded a Bronze Medal of Army Valor, which was affixed to the group's flag and added to the group's coat of arms.

On 31 March 1991 the 120th Self-propelled Field Artillery Group "Po" was disbanded and on 8 May the flag of the 120th Motorized Artillery Regiment was returned to the Shrine of the Flags in the Vittoriano in Rome.
