= Christmas Battle (1941) =

Battle in World War II

- Part of Italian participation on Eastern Front of World War II
Date	25 December 1941 – 28 December 1941
Location	Petropavlivka, Soviet Union
Result	Italian victory

Belligerents
Italy; Germany	Soviet Union

Commanders and leaders
(Kingdom of Italy) Giovanni Messe	(Soviet Union) Unknown

Strength
Elements of 3 divisions	1 rifle division 2 cavalry divisions at least 128 tanks

Casualties and losses
168 dead 207 missing	2,000+ dead 1,200 captured 24 artillery pieces captured

The Christmas Battle (Italian: La battaglia di natale) was fought between forces of the Soviet Red Army and the Italian Expeditionary Corps in Russia from 25 December to 28 December, 1941, during the Eastern Front of World War II, when the Soviets launched a multi-division attack in the gap between the Italian expeditionary force and the German XLIX Mountain Corps. The goal of the attack was to open the path to Stalino and threaten vital Axis railway junctures.

The attack was conducted on Christmas day by the Soviet 35th and 68th Cavalry divisions plus the 136th Rifle Division, and was primarily aimed at the Italian 3rd Cavalry Division "Principe Amedeo Duca d'Aosta", later reinforced by parts of the Italian 9th Infantry Division "Pasubio" and 52nd Infantry Division "Torino". Bearing the brunt of the attack against numerically-superior forces, the 3rd Cavalry Division held their sector. The limited Soviet gains were rolled back by Dec 27, when formations from the "Pasubio" and "Torino" divisions, plus the German 318th Infantry Regiment (with supporting armor), counterattacked and regained the lost ground. In the end, for the cost of 168 dead and 207 missing, the Italians had defeated the Soviets, who lost over 2,000 dead; the Italians also took 1,200 Soviet troops prisoner and captured 24 76mm guns, 9 anti-tank guns, and large stockpiles of machine guns and vehicles. The Italian victory was partly due to close collaboration between their infantry and artillery.

The 3rd Bersaglieri Regiment played a decisive part in the fighting, defending against ten-fold superior forces before falling back, and participating in the counterattack.
