= Christmas Rebellion =

Christmas Rebellion may refer to:

- Baptist War, also known as the "Christmas Uprising" and the "Great Jamaican Slave Revolt of 1831"
- Christmas Uprising - occurred in Montenegro after the First World War

== See also ==
- Christmas battle (disambiguation)
