= Bruno Malaguti =

Italian general of World War II

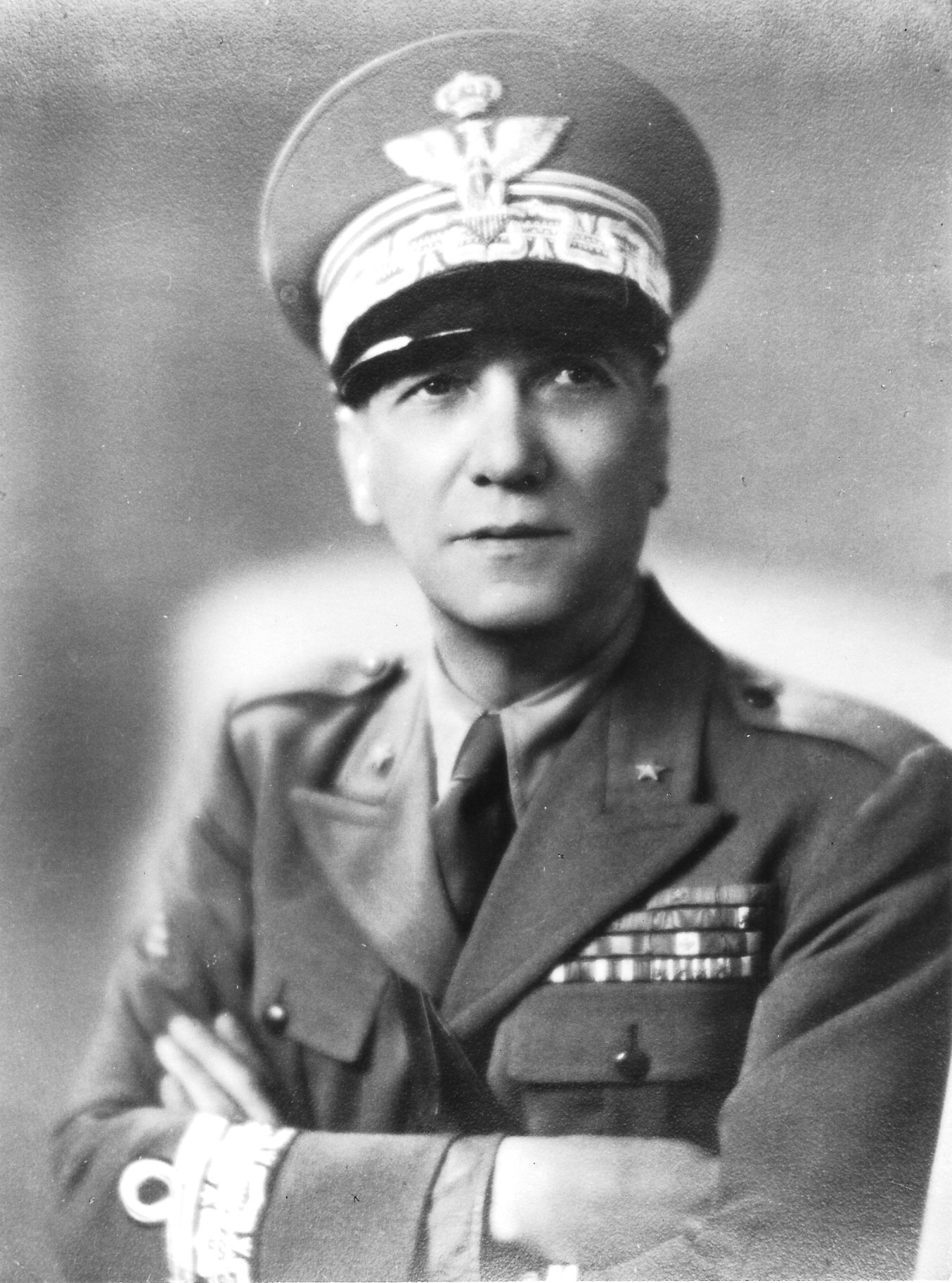
- Born: 5 December 1887; Finale Emilia, Kingdom of Italy
- Died: 2 December 1945 (aged 57); Rome, Italy
- Military career
- Allegiance: Kingdom of Italy
- Branch: Royal Italian Army
- Service years: 1909–1945
- Rank: Major General
- Commands: 6th Bersaglieri Regiment; 52nd Infantry Division "Torino"
- Conflicts: World War I; White War; Western Front; World War II; North African campaign; Italian campaign on the Eastern Front; Operation Achse
- Awards: Silver Medal of Military Valour (three times); Bronze Medal of Military Valour; War Cross for Military Valor; War Merit Cross (three times); Military Order of Savoy; Order of the Crown of Italy; Legion of Honour; Order of the Crown of King Zvonimir; Croix de guerre 1914–1918

Bruno Malaguti (5 December 1887 – 2 December 1945) was an Italian general during World War II.

== Biography ==
After attending the Military Academy of Modena and graduating in 1909, Malaguti participated in the First World War with the rank of Second Lieutenant with the 5th Bersaglieri Regiment, fighting on the Col di Lana from 1915 to 1917. In the last year of the war, he was part of the II Army Corps, deployed alongside the French Army on the Western Front on the Meuse river and in the Argonne region. During the war, Malaguti was repeatedly wounded and promoted for war merit; after the war, he was assigned to the Inter-Allied Commission in Germany with control and liaison functions.

In April 1928, he was promoted to lieutenant colonel and in 1934 he assumed command of the 6th Bersaglieri Regiment; in 1937, he became Deputy Chief of Staff of Army Corps. In November 1940, after promotion to brigadier general, he became Chief of Staff of the Army of the Po, and in May 1941, he was sent to North Africa and appointed Deputy Chief of Staff of the North Africa General Headquarters. In April 1942, after promotion to Major General, he was appointed Chief of Staff of the 8th Army (ARMIR), deployed on the Eastern Front.

Following the destruction of the ARMIR in early 1943, Malaguti was repatriated and given command of the 52nd Infantry Division "Torino", which was being reformed in Italy after its near-total destruction in Russia. The division was stationed in the Julian March near Gorizia; following the Armistice of Cassibile in September 1943, it resisted German attacks from 9 to 11 September, until ordered to withdraw on 12 September by the Corps commander, General Licurgo Zannini. Before being dismissed, General Malaguti ordered the release of all political prisoners from prisons and concentration camps. He was then arrested by the Germans and imprisoned in Stalag XX-A in Toruń, Poland.

In March 1944 Malaguti was handed over to the Italian Social Republic and detained in the prisons of Verona, Venice and Brescia; in January 1945 he was tried by the Special War Tribunal and sentenced to death, but before the sentence was carried out he was liberated on 25 April 1945 by the partisans following the insurrection in Northern Italy and the collapse of the Italian Social Republic. He was transferred to Rome by order of the Allied command and placed at the disposal of the Ministry of Defence, but his health had been compromised by the hardships endured in captivity, and he died in a hospital in Rome on 2 December 1945.
