= Italian participation on the Eastern Front =

- Part of the Eastern Front of World War II
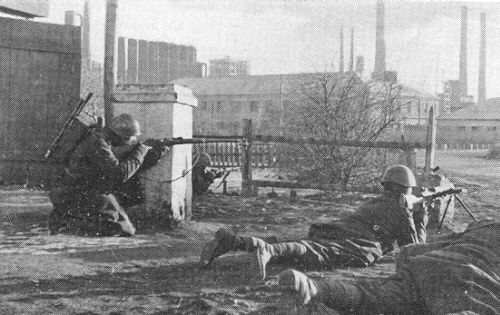
- Italian troops near Stalino in 1941
Date	August 1941 – 20 January 1943
Location	Regions of Dnestr, Southern Bug, Dnieper, Donets and Don rivers
Result	Italian defeat

Belligerents
Kingdom of Italy	Soviet Union

Commanders and leaders
(Kingdom of Italy) Giovanni Messe (CSIR); (Kingdom of Italy) Italo Gariboldi; (ARMIR)	(Soviet Union) Nikolai Vatutin; (Soviet Union) Filipp Golikov

Strength
CSIR : 65,000 ARMIR : 230,000	455,000 personnel; 1,170 tanks; 590 military aircraft

Casualties and losses
CSIR : 1,792 dead and missing; 7,858 injured; ARMIR : 75,000 dead and missing; 32,000 injured	No specific data available on the Red Army's casualties caused by the Italian forces alone

The Italian participation on the Eastern Front represented the military intervention of the Kingdom of Italy in the Operation Barbarossa, launched by Nazi Germany against the Soviet Union in 1941. The commitment to actively take part in the German offensive was decided by Benito Mussolini a few months before the beginning of the operation, when he became aware of Adolf Hitler's intention to invade, but it was confirmed only on the morning of 22 June 1941, as soon as the Italian dictator was informed that same day the German armies had invaded the Soviet Union.

An expeditionary force quickly became operational, with three divisions, previously put on alert: called the "Italian Expeditionary Corps in Russia" (Corpo di Spedizione Italiano in Russia, CSIR), it arrived on the eastern front in mid-July 1941. Initially integrated into the 11th German Army and then in the 1st Panzer Army, the CSIR participated in the campaign until April 1942, when the needs of the front required the sending of two other Italian corps which together with the CSIR were reunited into the 8th Italian Army or "Italian Army in Russia" (Armata Italiana in Russia, ARMIR). Deployed to the south, in the Don river sector, the 8th Italian Army together with the 2nd Hungarian Army and the 3rd Romanian Army were assigned to cover the left flank of the German forces that were advancing towards Stalingrad at the time.

Rapid reversals at the front changed the course of the battle; after the encirclement of the German forces in Stalingrad, the subsequent Soviet offensive that began on 16 December 1942 overwhelmed the 2nd and 35th Italian Army Corps (former CSIR), which were part of the southern deployment of the 8th Army, and six Italian divisions together with German and Romanian forces were forced to a hasty retreat. On 13 January 1943, a second major Soviet offensive north of the Don overwhelmed the Alpini troops still in line, poorly equipped and short of supplies, who retreated along the steppes. The retreat cost the Italian forces tens of thousands of men and ended on 31 January, when the 2nd Alpine Division Tridentina reached the first German outposts in Shebekino. The repatriating operations lasted from 6 to 15 March and ended on 24 March, putting an end to the Italian military operations in the Soviet Union.

== Italian Expeditionary Corps in Russia ==
Constituted on 10 July 1941, the Italian Expeditionary Corps in Russia (CSIR) arrived in the southern Soviet Union between July and August 1941. The CSIR was initially subordinated to German General Eugen Ritter von Schobert's 11th Army. On 14 August 1941, the CSIR was transferred to the control of General Ewald von Kleist's 1st Panzer Group. On 25 October, 1st Panzer Group was redesignated as the 1st Panzer Army. The CSIR remained under von Kleist's command until 3 June 1942, when it was subordinated to German General Richard Ruoff's 17th Army.

CSIR's original commander, General Francesco Zingales, fell ill in Vienna during the early stages of transport to the Soviet Union. On 14 July 1941, Zingales was replaced by General Giovanni Messe.

The CSIR had three divisions: the 3rd Cavalry Division "Principe Amedeo Duca d'Aosta", the 9th Infantry Division "Pasubio" and the 52nd Infantry Division "Torino".

=== August 1941 – July 1942, CSIR Operations ===
The CSIR was sent to the southern sector of the German advance in Ukraine in July 1941. In August 1941, as part of the German 11th Army, the CSIR made its first contact with the enemy. The CSIR pursued retreating Soviet troops between the Bug River and Dniestr River. While the 11th Army besieged Odessa, the CSIR was attached to 1st Panzer Group under General Ewald von Kleist.

In its early encounters it was successful, taking a number of towns and cities and creating a favourable impression on its German allies. Its most notable early victory came at the Battle of Petrikowka in September 1941, where the Italians encircled some sizable Red Army units, inflicting unknown combat casualties on them and capturing over 10,000 prisoners of war as well as significant numbers of weapons and horses. Petrikowka was part of a larger independently-executed maneuver that opened the way for German armour and contributed to the encirclement of five Soviet divisions. The pincer movement was executed jointly between the Pasubio, Torino, and Celere divisions, which united at Petrikowka to block the Soviet exit route. This cost them only 291 casualties of their own: 87 killed, 190 wounded, and 14 missing. On 20 October, the CSIR together with the German XXXXIX Mountain Corps captured the major industrial center of Stalino (now Donetsk) after heavy resistance from the Soviet defenders. While the CSIR did not participate in the siege of Odessa, Italian troops assisted in the occupation of the Odessa area after the city fell on 16 October 1941. Units from the Pasubio motorised division attacked the neighboring city of Gorlovka on 2 November.

The Capture of Gorlovka (a city of 120,000 inhabitants) was preceded by the "Pasubio" division carefully clearing out the minefields around the city's outskirts in the previous week. The "Duca d'Aosta" cavalry division meanwhile captured the industrial town of Rukovo after heavy fighting. On 2 November, the "Pasubio" division threatened Gorlovka from the west, while the "Duca d'Aosta" division threatened the southeast. The city's defenders included the Soviet 296th Rifle Division. The "Pasubio" division's 80th Regiment engaged in close house-to-house fighting with the defenders, while the 79th Regiment (supported by "Duca d'Aosta" artillery units) swept through the downtown district with little resistance. Soviet combat casualties were unknown, but about 600 soldiers were taken prisoner. The Soviet 296th Rifle Division withdrew, and fighting continued for the next few days as the Italians cleared enemy remnants from the city and the surrounding area.

With the onset of winter, the CSIR units began consolidating their occupation zone and preparing defensive works. In the last week of December, the "Duca d'Aosta" division was hit with a fierce counterattack by Soviet forces. They managed to beat back the attacks long enough for the German 1st Panzer Army to provide back-up to their sector and subsequently defeat the Soviet offensive. The "Christmas Battle" grew in size and eventually consisted of several Soviet divisions, including the 35th and 68th Cavalry and the 136th Rifle Divisions. The Soviet offensive failed. In total, the Christmas Battle cost the Italians 168 dead, 715 wounded, and 207 missing; the Italians had defeated superior Soviet forces, which suffered over 2,000 dead, and had captured 1,200 prisoners, 24 76 mm guns and 9 AT guns as well as hundreds of machine guns and vehicles. Subsequently, forces from the First Panzer Army counterattacked and rolled backed the few Soviet gains.

The CSIR subsequently weathered the 1941–1942 winter well in its relatively quiet occupation zone. Up to this point, the CSIR had taken 8,700 casualties.

== Italian 8th Army or Italian Army in Russia ==
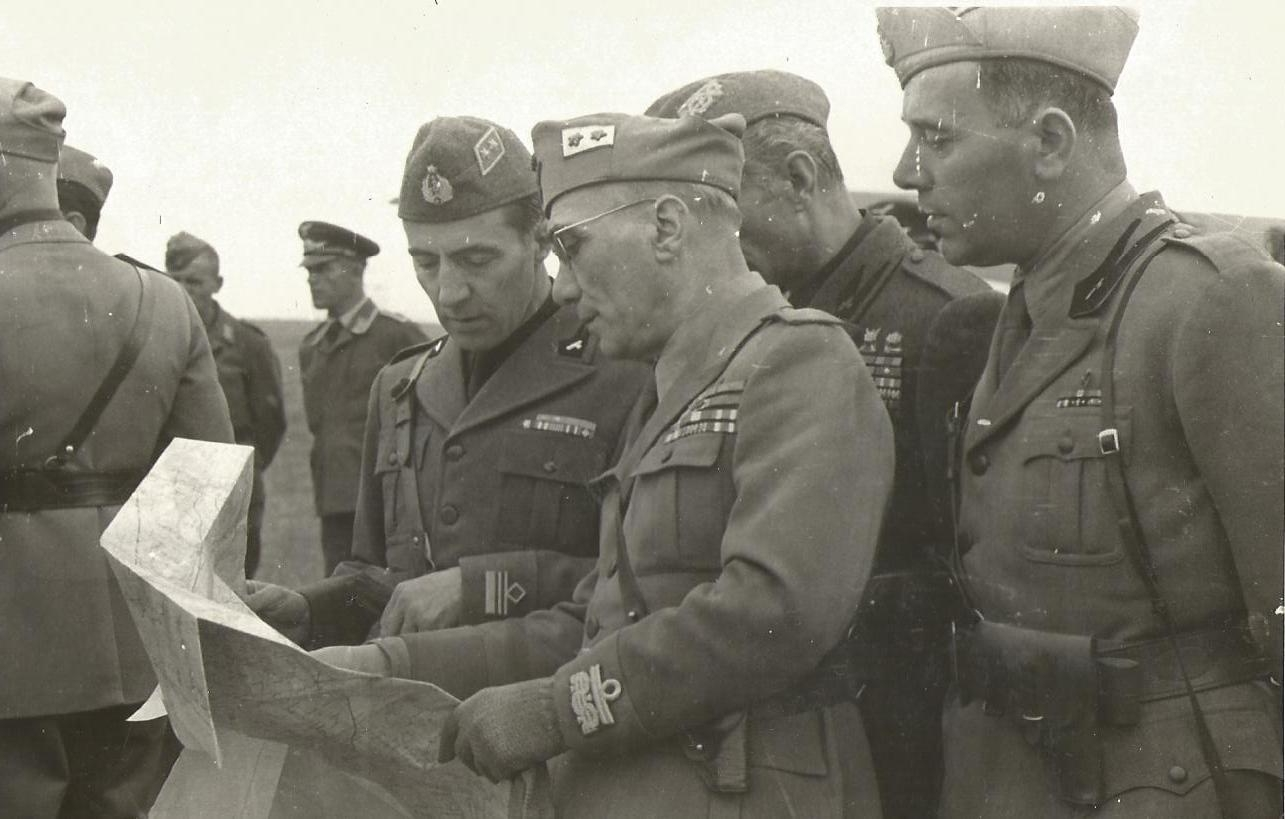
General Bruno Malaguti, Chief of Staff of the 8th Army (ARMIR), and Italian officers intently study a map during the invasion of Russia, 1942

In July 1942, Mussolini scaled up the Italian effort on the Eastern Front and the CSIR became the 8th Italian Army. The 8th Italian Army was also known as the Italian Army in Russia (ARMIR). The ARMIR was subordinated to German General Maximilian von Weichs' Army Group B. His justifications were the Italian duty to fight Soviet Bolshevism and the requests by his German allies for additional forces, Operation Barbarossa having been longer and costlier than they expected. General Messe and many other traditional officers opposed further commitments to the Eastern Front, seeing it as of little importance and cautioning further subordination to Germany, but Mussolini overruled them.

Italian General Italo Gariboldi took command of the newly formed ARMIR from General Messe. As commander of the CSIR, Messe had opposed an enlargement of the Italian contingent in Russia until it could be properly equipped. As a result, he was dismissed. Just prior to commanding the ARMIR, Gariboldi was the Governor-General of Italian Libya.

Mussolini sent seven new divisions to Russia for a total of ten divisions. Four new infantry divisions were sent and included: the 2nd Infantry Division Sforzesca, the 3rd Infantry Division Ravenna, the 5th Infantry Division Cosseria, and the 156th Infantry Division Vicenza. In addition to the infantry divisions, three new Alpini divisions were sent: the 2nd Alpine Division Tridentina, the 3rd Alpine Division Julia, and the 4th Alpine Division Cuneense. These new divisions were added to the Torino, Pasubio, and Prince Amedeo Duke of Aosta divisions already in Russia. Italian forces in Russia would eventually total 229,000 men, 22,000 vehicles, and 1,340 artillery pieces.

=== ARMIR Operations ===
The ARMIR advanced toward the right bank of the Don River which was reached by July 1942. From 17 to 20 July 1942, the Italians fought for and captured the important coal-mining basin of Krasny Lutsch (southeast of Kharkov) with a rapid enveloping maneuver. This cost the army 90 killed and 540 wounded, while inflicting over 1,000 combat casualties on the Soviets and taking 4,000 Soviet troops as prisoners. On 6 July, the 3rd Cavalry Division captured Ivanovka at the cost of 400 killed and wounded; the Soviets suffered at least as many killed and wounded, plus another 1,000 troops taken prisoner. On 30 July, the highly-mobile riflemen (Bersaglieri) of the 3rd Cavalry Division Amedeo Duca d'Aosta rushed to relieve the German 587th Regiment, which was clashing with the enemy near the Soviet bridgehead at Serafimovich.

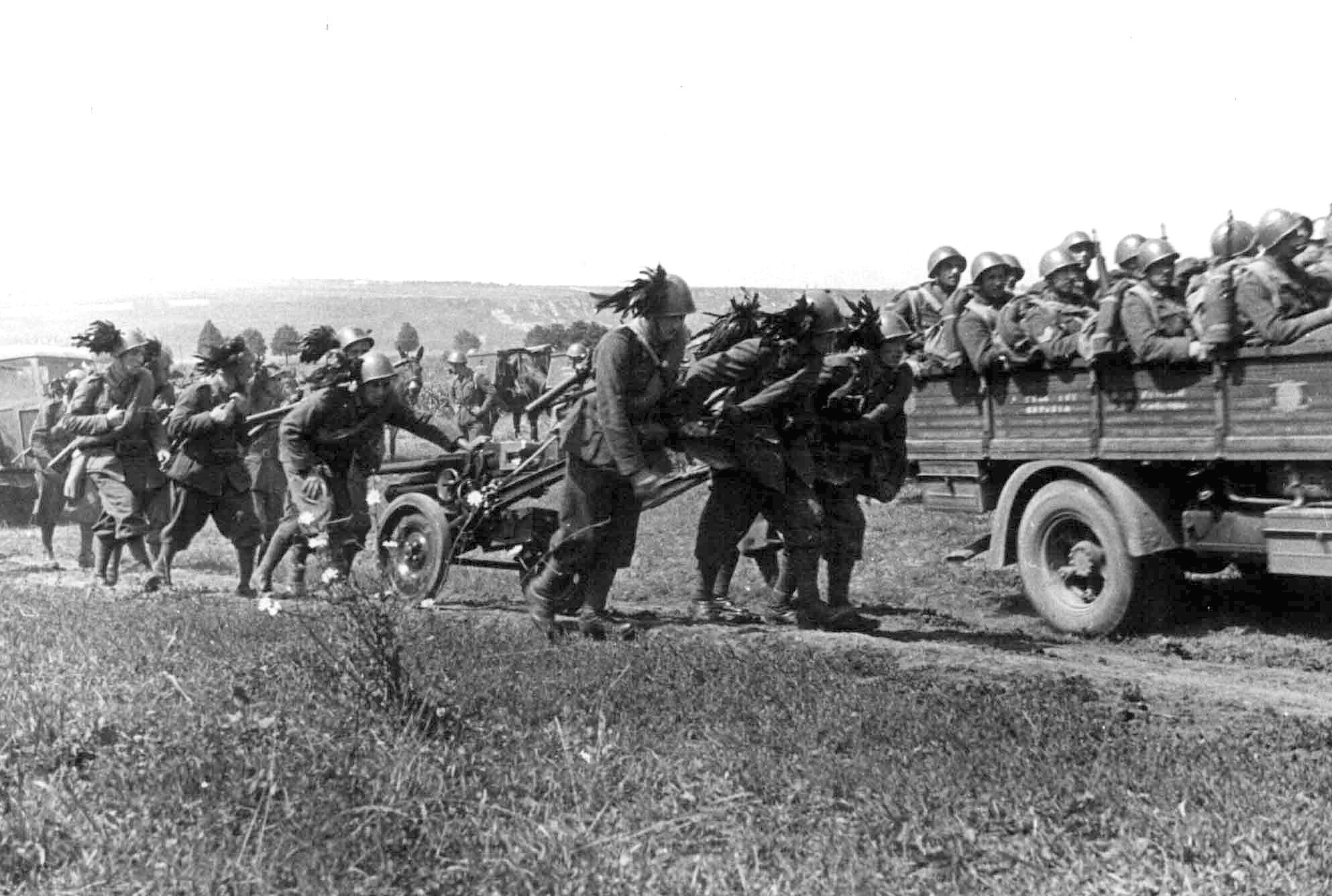
Italian bersaglieri with artillery advancing towards Serafimovich

The 3rd Division arrived on 30 July, by which time the 587th Regiment had been reduced to only a few hundred men. Initial Soviet strength in and around the area (including the towns of Bobrovskiy and Baskovskiy) was 3,000 men and 40 tanks, but was increased soon after the Italians arrived. On 30 July and 1 August, the Soviets attempted to stop the Italians as they were crossing the river to relieve the remnants of the 587th, but failed and lost several dozen tanks (primarily T-34s) in the process. The Soviets and Bersaglieri fought for the next two days, primarily in and around the town of Bobrovskiy, until 3 August, when the Soviets were forced back to their bridgehead at Serafimovich. The Italians then assaulted Serafimovich, which they took. Sporadic fighting continued around this area until 14 August. The 3rd Division's losses from 30 July to 14 August were 1,700 killed and 200 wounded; Soviet combat casualties are unknown, but the Italians reportedly took 5,800 Soviet troops prisoner and captured 10 artillery pieces.

On 12 August, three Soviet divisions totaling about 30,000 troops and many tanks crossed the Don River to launch a counterattack on the Italian sector. They successfully took the 2nd Mountain Infantry Division Sforzesca by surprise and, with no tanks at its disposal and outnumbered four to one, the Sforzesca division was routed in two days. It subsequently withdrew to Yagodny, which was attacked by the Soviets on 20 August. From 20–24 August, the remnants of the division beat back several Soviet attacks and even launched some small scale counterattacks, until they mostly ran out of ammunition and were down to repelling the last Soviet probes with bayonets. Bersaglieri reinforcements arrived on 24 August, and defeated the Soviets, sending the survivors retreating. The Italians refer to this as the First Defensive Battle of the Don. Italian losses were 900 killed, 4,200 wounded, and 1,700 missing or captured.

On 13 August, the Italian Army in Russia reached its assigned sector on the Don on the left flank of the Sixth Army's XVII Corps. The II Corps had mounted a foot march of 1100 kilometers (on average 32 kilometres per day) during which supply problems and partisans had caused minor delays, but the Italians' advance had been mostly calm.

The Charge of the Savoia Cavalleria at Izbushensky was a clash between the Italian cavalry Regiment "Savoia Cavalleria" (3rd) and the Soviet 812th Rifle Regiment (304th Rifle Division) that took place on 24 August 1942, near the hamlet (khutor) of Izbushensky (Избушенский), close to the junction between the Don and Khopyor rivers. Though a minor skirmish in the theatre of operation of the Eastern Front, the Izbushensky charge had great propaganda resonance in Italy and it is still remembered as one of the last significant cavalry charges in history.

By late autumn 1942, the ARMIR was placed on the left flank of the German 6th Army between Hungarian and Romanian forces. The German 6th Army was then investing Soviet General Vasily Chuikov's 62nd Army in Stalingrad. The Italian line stretched along the River Don for more than 250 km from the positions of the Hungarian 2nd Army in Kalmiskowa to the positions of the Romanian 3rd Army in Veshenskaja, a village 270 km northwest of Stalingrad. The Italians threw up a thin screen along the river. No trench lines had been dug nor effective defensive positions set up. Heavy snow and severe frost were hampering troop movements.

The situation for the German troops in Stalingrad remained stable until the Soviets launched Operation Uranus on 19 November 1942. The aim of this operation was the complete encirclement and isolation of the German 6th Army. To accomplish this, the Soviets struck at the weak Romanian armies to the north and south of Stalingrad. The Soviets planned Operation Uranus as a double envelopment. The twin attacks smashed through portions of the Romanian 3rd Army and the Romanian 4th Army and successfully met at Kalach four days after the operation began.

In October 1942, it was declared that all officers and men that had served in Russia since 13 December 1941 or earlier could ask for repatriation. The Germans estimated that around 60 per cent of the XXXV Corps' infantry was substituted in October and December.

=== Stalingrad and Little Saturn ===
The situation for the Italian troops along the Don River remained stable until the Soviets launched Operation Little Saturn on 16 December 1942. The aim of this operation was the annihilation of Axis troops along the Don and Chir River, mainly the Italian 8th Army.

The Soviet 63rd Army, backed by T-34 tanks and fighter-bombers, first attacked the weakest Italian sector. This sector was held on the right by the Ravenna and Cosseria infantry divisions. From the Soviet bridgehead at Mamon, 15 divisions—supported by at least 100 tanks—attacked these two divisions. Although outnumbered nine-to-one, the Italians resisted until 19 December, when ARMIR headquarters finally ordered the battered divisions to withdraw. By Christmas both divisions were driven back and defeated after bloody fighting.

Meanwhile, on 17 December 1942, the Soviet 21st Army and the Soviet 5th Tank Army attacked and defeated what remained of the Romanians to the right of the Italians. At about the same time, the Soviet 3rd Tank Army and parts of the Soviet 40th Army hit the Hungarians to the left of the Italians.

The Soviet 1st Guards Army then attacked the Italian center which was held by the 298th German, the Pasubio, the Torino, the Prince Amedeo Duke of Aosta, and the Sforzesca divisions. After eleven days of bloody fighting against overwhelming Soviet forces, these divisions were surrounded and defeated. A Russian air raid resulted in the death of General Paolo Tarnassi, commander of the Italian armoured force in Russia. General Enrico Pezzi, commander of the Italian Air Force in Russia, was also killed during an airlift to a besieged Italian garrison in Chertkovo.

On 14 January 1943, after a short pause, the 6th Soviet Army attacked the Alpini divisions of the Italian Mountain Corps. These units had been placed on the left flank of the Italian army and were until then still relatively unaffected by the battle. However, the Alpini position had turned critical after the collapse of the Italian center and right flank and the simultaneous collapse of the Hungarian troops to the left of the Alpini. The Julia and Cuneense Divisions were destroyed. Members of the 1 Alpini Regiment, part of Cuneese Division, burned the regimental flags to keep them from being captured. Part of the Tridentina Division and other troops managed to escape the encirclement.

On 21 January, Italians caused a friendly fire incident when, northwest of Stalingrad, they encountered a retreating party of the German 385th Infantry Division, during which some of their troops blew up with hand grenades the command vehicle of Generalmajor Karl Eibl, having mistaken it for a Soviet armoured car, killing the general.

On 26 January, after heavy fighting which resulted in the Battle of Nikolayevka, the Alpini remnants breached the encirclement and reached new defensive positions set up to the west by the Germans. But, by this time, the only operational fighting unit was the Tridentina Division, and even it was not fully operational. The Tridentina Division had led the final breakout assault at Nikolajewka. Many of the troops who managed to escape were frostbitten, critically ill, and deeply demoralized.

Overall, about 130,000 Italians had been surrounded by the Soviet offensive. According to Italian sources, about 20,800 soldiers died in the fighting, 64,000 were captured, and 45,000 were able to withdraw.

== Aftermath ==
Since the beginning of the Italian campaign in Russia, about 30,000 Italians had been killed and another 44,000 would die in captivity. By the end of February 1943, the rout of the ARMIR was complete. Mussolini then withdrew what remained of his 8th Army from Russian soil. The Italian forces in Russia had been reduced to less than 150,000 men, and 34,000 of these were wounded. The disaster in Russia was a fierce blow to the power and popularity of the dictator when the gloomy news soon reached the public in Italy. Survivors blamed the Fascist political elite and the army generals. The survivors said they both had acted irresponsibly by sending a poorly prepared, ill-equipped, and inadequately armed military force to the Russian Front. According to veterans, weapons in Italian service were awful: hand grenades rarely went off and rifles and machine guns had to be warmed for a long time over a fire to work properly in the extreme cold, thus often being incapable of firing in the midst of battle. The German commanders were accused of sacrificing the Italian divisions, whose withdrawal was supposedly delayed after the Soviet breakthrough, in order to rescue their own troops.

Throughout 1943, Italy's fortunes worsened. On 25 July 1943, Benito Mussolini and his Fascist government were removed from power by King Victor Emmanuel III. On 8 September, the new Italian government led by the King and Marshal Pietro Badoglio signed an armistice with the Allies.

Soon, competing Italian armed forces were being raised to fight for both the Allies and the Axis. Forces of the Royalist Co-Belligerent Army (Esercito Cobelligerante Italiano, or ECI) were formed in southern Italy, while those of the Fascist National Republican Army (Esercito Nazionale Repubblicano, or ENR) formed in northern Italy. The ECI was the army of what was known as "Badoglio's government." The ENR was the army of Mussolini's Italian Social Republic (Repubblica Sociale Italiana, or RSI).

Even after the evacuation of the Italian troops from Russia and even after the armistice in 1943, some ENR units remained on the Eastern Front fighting for the Axis. There were five specialized 'smoke cover' battalions defending the Baltic ports of Swinemünde, Gotenhafen, Pillau and Stettin, plus one at the Grossborn proving ground. In addition, the 834th Field Hospital continued to operate in Russia, as well as the battalion "IX Settembre"; a small unit that fought alongside the Brandenburgers in East Prussia for a brief period.

== War crimes allegations ==
In 1949, a Soviet commission of inquiry produced a report entitled On the misdeeds of the Italo-Fascist troops on the territory of the Soviet Union, which detailed alleged war crimes committed by the Italian army on the Eastern Front. These allegations, including the execution of civilians and prisoners of war, forced labour, and the destruction of towns and villages, were largely ignored in Italy during the Cold War. Motivated by a desire to protect the army's reputation and distance it from the actions of the German occupiers, the Italian government prioritised preventing the extradition of accused officers over investigating the Soviet allegations. This contributed to a long-standing narrative, derived from war memoirs and early historiographical studies, that cultivated the myth of the Italian army's innocence of war crimes on the Eastern Front. The cliché of "Italians, good people" went largely unchallenged, despite evidence of Italian involvement in the German occupation and repression apparatus, war crimes against the civilian population and the exploitation of prisoners of war for forced labour.

== See also ==
- Italian prisoners of war in the Soviet Union
- Military history of Italy during World War II
