= 3rd Cavalry Division "Principe Amedeo Duca d'Aosta" =

WW2 Royal Italian Army formation

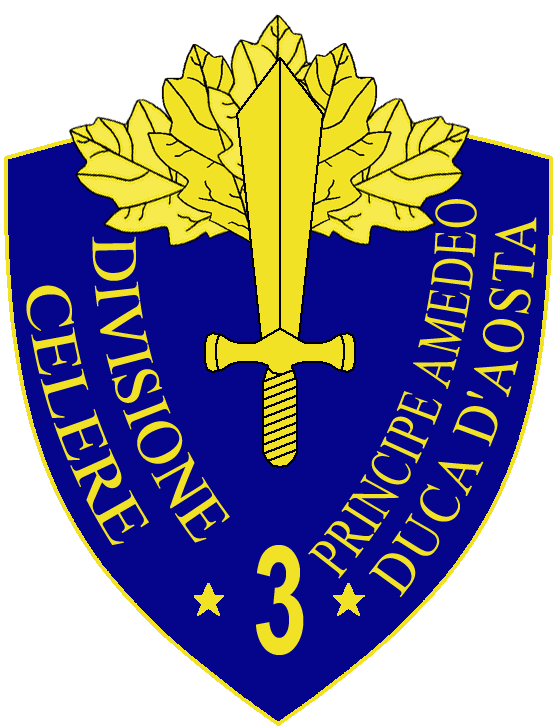
- 3rd Cavalry Division "Principe Amedeo Duca d'Aosta" insignia
- Active: 1934 – 1943
- Country: Kingdom of Italy
- Branch: Royal Italian Army
- Type: Cavalry
- Size: Division
- Part of: Italian Expeditionary Corps in Russia; 8th Army
- Garrison/HQ: Milan
- Engagements: World War II: Yugoslavia; Stalino; Nikolayevka

Insignia
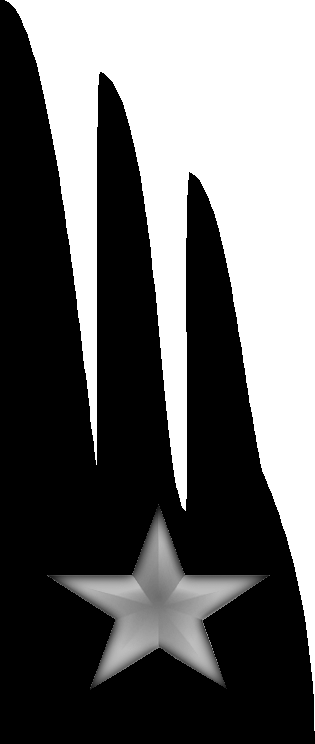
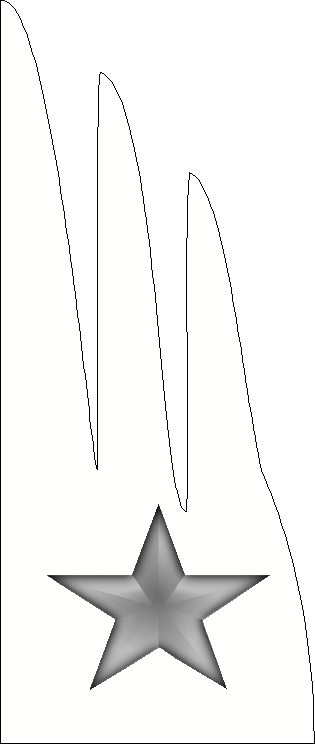
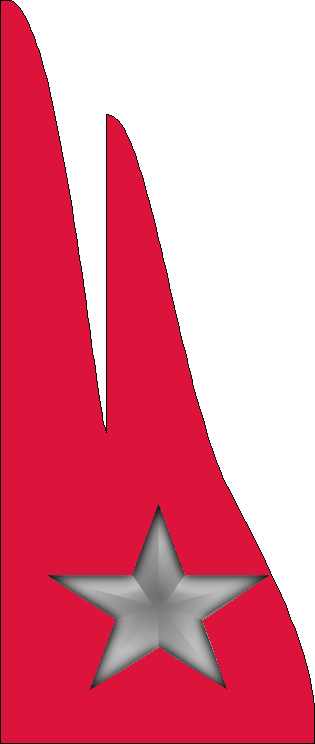
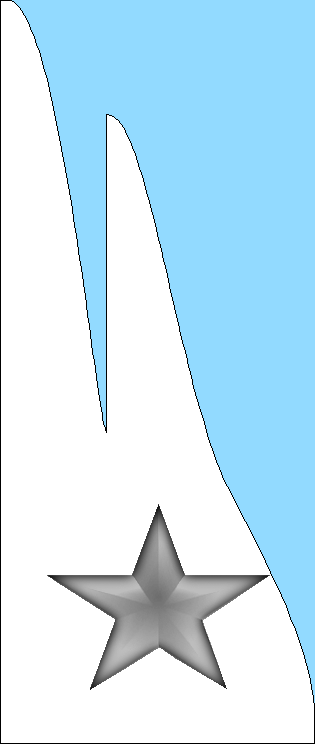
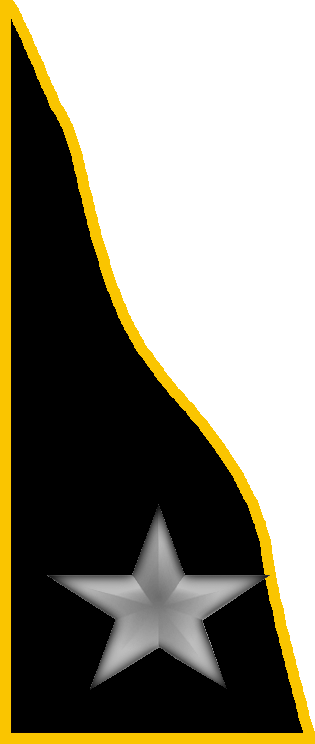
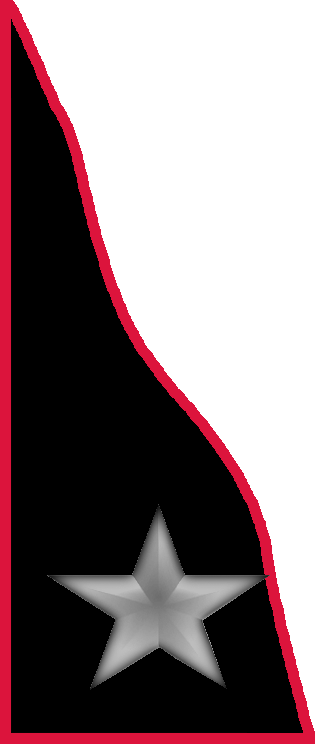
- Identification symbol: Principe Amedeo Duca d'Aosta Division gorget patches

The 3rd Cavalry Division "Principe Amedeo Duca d'Aosta" (Italian: 3ª Divisione celere "Principe Amedeo Duca d'Aosta") was a Cavalry or "Celere" (Fast) division of the Royal Italian Army during World War II. The division was formed in 1934, and during World War II was mobilized in June 1940. As a cavalry division it took part in the Invasion of Yugoslavia and was part of the Italian Expeditionary Corps in Russia. Annihilated during the Red Army's Operation Little Saturn in December 1942, the survivors returned to Italy in spring 1943.

== History ==
The division was formed on 1 November 1934 as 3rd Cavalry Division "Principe Amedeo Duca d'Aosta" in Milan. Although not officially sanctioned the division is considered to be the heir of the 3rd Cavalry Division of Lombardy, which fought in World War I and consisted of the V and VI cavalry brigades and was based in Milan. The division consisted of the III Cavalry Brigade "Principe Amedeo Duca d'Aosta" and the 3rd Artillery Regiment for Cavalry Division. The cavalry brigade consisted of the cavalry regiments Regiment "Savoia Cavalleria" and Regiment "Lancieri di Novara", the 8th Bersaglieri Regiment, and the III Light Tanks Group "San Giorgio". On 1 February 1938 the III Cavalry Brigade "Principe Amedeo Duca d'Aosta" was dissolved and its units came under direct command of the division.

=== World War II ===
In March 1941 the division had to transfer its 3rd Fast Artillery Regiment "Principe Amedeo Duca d'Aosta" with the II and III motorized groups to Libya, where it was assigned to the 17th Infantry Division "Pavia" to replace the 26th Artillery Regiment, which had been destroyed by British forces during the Battle of Beda Fomm on 6–7 February 1941. The division participated in the Invasion of Yugoslavia and returned to Milan on 31 May 1941. There the division received on 23 June the two remaining horse artillery groups of its two sister divisions 1st Cavalry Division "Eugenio di Savoia" and 2nd Cavalry Division "Emanuele Filiberto Testa di Ferro", which allowed the "Principe Amedeo Duca d'Aosta" to form the 3rd Horse Artillery Regiment for the division's upcoming deployment to the Eastern front.

=== Eastern Front ===
On 13 August 1941 the division reached Dniprodzerzhynsk (today Kamianske on the Dnipro in central Ukraine, where the division took up position to the right of the 9th Infantry Division "Pasubio". On 28 September the Pasubio forced the river and the division's of the Italian Expeditionary Corps in Russia went on the offensive, which brought them to Stalino (today Donetsk) by 13 October. After a month of fierce combat Stalino and nearby Horlivka were taken. The divisions continued their slowing offensive until 25 December, when the Soviets launched a determined counterattack in the Christmas Battle. The Italians repulsed the attack and the front stabilized afterwards for January.

On 15 March 1942 the division was radically reorganized: it received the 6th Bersaglieri Regiment from the 2nd Cavalry Division "Emanuele Filiberto Testa di Ferro", the 120th Motorized Artillery Regiment, the LXVII Armored Bersaglieri Battalion (two companies of L6/40 light tanks), the IC Mortar Battalion, the XIII Squadrons Group/ Regiment "Cavalleggeri di Alessandria", with two squadrons of Semovente da 47/32 self-propelled guns, and an expanded complement of mortars and anti-tank weapons. The division's two cavalry regiments, the horse artillery regiment and the III Light Tanks Group "San Giorgio" were removed from the division and formed the independent Horse Troops Grouping under direct command of the 8th Italian Army. With the new units and equipment the 3rd Cavalry Division was now structured similar to Italian motorized divisions.

In April 1942, the division was further reinforced when the Croatian Light Transport Brigade arrived at the front and was attached to the "Principe Amedeo Duca d'Aosta". From 30 July to 9 August the two Bersaglieri regiments eliminated the Soviet bridgehead at Serafimovich and later that month, with the support of German tanks, the Bersaglieri repelled a Soviet attack during the first defensive battle of the Don.

By late autumn 1942, the 8th Italian Army was placed on the left flank of the German 6th Army between the Hungarian and Romanian forces. The German 6th Army was then investing Soviet General Vasily Chuikov's 62nd Army in Stalingrad. The Italian front line stretched along the Don river for more than 250 kilometres (160 mi) from the positions of the Hungarian 2nd Army in Kalmiskowa to the positions of the Romanian 3rd Army in Veshenskaya.

=== Operation Little Saturn ===
On 17 December the Soviets began Operation Little Saturn and under immense pressure of superior Soviet armored forces the Italian divisions had to retreat from the Don the next day, but the motorized Soviet formations overtook the Italians and therefore repeatedly the Italians had to fight their way through Soviet defensive lines on their way towards Poltava and Dnipropetrovsk. After three weeks in the icy desert of the Steppe the survivors crossed the Donets river. The few remaining troops formed a Kampfgruppe and continued to fight until February 1943. The last troops were withdrawn to Italy in March 1943 and garrisoned in Bologna and Imola, where the process of rebuilding the division began.

After the announcement of the Armistice of Cassibile on 8 September 1943 the division and its units were disbanded on 15 September 1943 after brief resistance against the invading German forces.

== Organization ==
=== August 1940 ===
3rd Cavalry Division "Principe Amedeo Duca d'Aosta" organization in 1940

The division had undergone a level of mechanization and fielded two cavalry regiments, a Bersaglieri regiment, a motorized artillery regiment, and a light tanks group. The squadrons of the cavalry regiments were horse-mounted and, other than a motorcycle company, the Bersaglieri were issued with bicycles. The light tanks group had a total of 61 L3/35s and L6/40 tanks.

- 3rd Cavalry Division "Principe Amedeo Duca d'Aosta", in Milan
  - Headquarters
    - Command Squadron
    - 355th Carabinieri Section
    - 356th Carabinieri Section
    - 40th Field Post Office
    - 3rd Cavalry Division Command Transport Squad
  - Regiment "Savoia Cavalleria", in Milan
    - Command Squadron
    - I Squadrons Group
    - II Squadrons Group
    - 5th Machine Gun Squadron
  - Regiment "Lancieri di Novara", in Verona
    - Command Squadron
    - I Squadrons Group
    - II Squadrons Group
    - 5th Machine Gun Squadron
  - 3rd Bersaglieri Regiment, in Milan
    - Command Company
    - XVIII Bersaglieri Battalion
    - XX Bersaglieri Battalion
    - XXV Bersaglieri Battalion
    - 2nd Motorcyclists Company (detached from the 2nd Bersaglieri Regiment)
    - 3rd Motorcyclists Company
    - 3rd Cannons Company (47/32 mod. 35 anti-tank guns)
  - 3rd Fast Artillery Regiment "Principe Amedeo Duca d'Aosta", in Milan (replaced by the 3rd Horse Artillery Regiment for the campaign in the Soviet Union)
    - Command Unit
    - I Group (75/27 mod. 12 horse-drawn guns)
    - II Group (75/27 mod. 11 field guns)
    - III Group (75/27 mod. 11 field guns)
    - 1 × Anti-aircraft battery (20/65 mod. 35 anti-aircraft guns)
    - Ammunition and Supply Unit
  - 3rd Horse Artillery Regiment
    - Command Unit
    - I Group (75/27 mod. 12 horse-drawn guns)
    - II Group (75/27 mod. 12 horse-drawn guns)
    - III Group (75/27 mod. 12 horse-drawn guns)
    - 1 × Anti-aircraft battery (20/65 mod. 35 anti-aircraft guns)
    - Ammunition and Supply Unit
  - III Light Tanks Group "San Giorgio", in Verona (L3/35 tankettes and L6/40 tanks)
  - IC Mortar Battalion (81mm mod. 35 mortars; formed for the campaign in the Soviet Union)
  - 172nd Anti-tank Company (47/32 mod. 35 anti-tank guns; detached from the 2nd Cavalry Division "Emanuele Filiberto Testa di Ferro" for the campaign in the Soviet Union)
  - 173rd Anti-tank Company (47/32 mod. 35 anti-tank guns)
  - 103rd Mixed Engineer Company (split 1941 into the 103rd Telegraph and Radio Operators Company and 105th Engineer Company)
  - 103rd Telegraph and Radio Operators Company
  - 105th Engineer Company
  - 73rd Medical Section
    - 46th Field Hospital
    - 47th Field Hospital
    - 148th Field Hospital
    - 159th Field Hospital (detached from the 2nd Cavalry Division "Emanuele Filiberto Testa di Ferro" for the campaign in the Soviet Union)
    - 30th Surgical Unit
  - 93rd Supply Section
  - 213th Mixed Transport Unit
    - 36th Transport Section
    - 872nd Transport Section
    - 873rd Transport Section
    - 874th Transport Section

Attached during the Invasion of Yugoslavia in 1941:

- Regiment "Genova Cavalleria"
  - Command Squadron
  - I Squadrons Group
  - II Squadrons Group
  - 5th Machine Gun Squadron

=== August 1942 ===
3rd Cavalry Division "Principe Amedeo Duca d'Aosta" organization after August 1942

After the reorganization in August 1942 the division consisted of the following units:

- 3rd Cavalry Division "Principe Amedeo Duca d'Aosta"
  - Headquarters
    - Command Squadron
    - 355th Carabinieri Section
    - 356th Carabinieri Section
    - 40th Field Post Office
    - 3rd Cavalry Division Command Transport Squad
  - 3rd Bersaglieri Regiment
    - Command Company
    - XVIII Auto-transported Battalion
    - XX Auto-transported Battalion
    - XXV Auto-transported Battalion
    - 172nd Anti-tank Company (47/32 mod. 35 anti-tank guns)
  - 6th Bersaglieri Regiment
    - Command Company
    - VI Auto-transported Battalion
    - XIII Auto-transported Battalion
    - XIX Auto-transported Battalion
    - 173rd Anti-tank Company (47/32 mod. 35 anti-tank guns)
  - 120th Motorized Artillery Regiment
    - Command Unit
    - I Motorized Group (100/17 mod. 14 howitzers)
    - II Motorized Group (75/27 mod. 11 field guns)
    - III Motorized Group (75/27 mod. 11 field guns)
    - 75th Anti-tank Battery (75/39 anti-tank guns)
    - 101st Anti-aircraft Battery (20/65 mod. 35 anti-aircraft guns)
    - 220th Anti-aircraft Battery (20/65 mod. 35 anti-aircraft guns)
  - IC Mortar Battalion (81mm mod. 35 mortars)
  - XIII Self-propelled Anti-tank Squadrons Group "Cavalleggeri di Alessandria" (Semovente da 47/32 self-propelled guns)
  - XLVII Bersaglieri Motorcyclists Battalion
  - LXVII Armored Bersaglieri Battalion (L6/40 tanks)
  - 272nd Anti-tank Company (47/32 mod. 35 anti-tank guns)
  - 103rd Telegraph and Radio Operators Company
  - 105th Engineer Company
  - XIV Transport Group
    - 122nd Light Transport Unit
    - 213th Mixed Transport Unit
    - 218th Heavy Transport Unit
    - 219th Heavy Transport Unit
  - 73rd Medical Section
    - 46th Field Hospital
    - 47th Field Hospital
    - 148th Field Hospital
    - 30th Surgical Unit
  - 93rd Supply Section

== Military honors ==
For their conduct during the campaign in the Soviet Union the President of Italy awarded the division's units six Gold Medals of Military Valor - Italy's highest military honor. This makes the 3rd Cavalry Division "Principe Amedeo Duca d'Aosta" together with the 3rd Alpine Division "Julia" the two highest decorated Italian divisions of World War II.

- 3rd Bersaglieri Regiment on 31 December 1947
- 3rd Bersaglieri Regiment on 30 January 1948
- Regiment "Savoia Cavalleria" on 13 December 1948
- Regiment "Lancieri di Novara" on 13 December 1948
- 6th Bersaglieri Regiment on 26 May 1956
- 6th Bersaglieri Regiment on 13 December 1958

== Commanding officers ==
The division's commanding officers were:

- Generale di Divisione Francesco Guidi (20 September 1934 – 12 November 1935)
- Generale di Divisione Sebastiano Murari della Corte Brà (13 November 1935 - ?)
- Generale di Divisione Mario Berti (? - 31 March 1938)
- Generale di Divisione Giovanni Messe (1 April 1938 – 16 May 1940)
- Generale di Divisione Mario Marazzani (10 June 1940 – 1 November 1942)
- Generale di Divisione Ettore de Blasio (3 November 1942 – 15 September 1943)

== See also ==
- List of military units named after people
