= Giovanni Messe =

Italian field marshal and politician (1883–1968)

Marshal of Italy Giovanni Messe
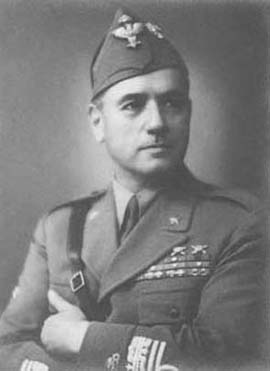
- Messe in 1941

Chief of the Italian General Staff
- In office 18 November 1943 – 1 May 1945
- Preceded by: Vittorio Ambrosio
- Succeeded by: Claudio Trezzani

Personal details
- Born: 10 December 1883 Mesagne, Kingdom of Italy
- Died: 18 December 1968 (aged 85) Rome, Italian Republic

Military service
- Allegiance: Kingdom of Italy; Italian Republic
- Branch/service: Royal Italian Army
- Years of service: 1901–1947
- Rank: Marshal of Italy
- Commands: First Army; German-Italian Panzer Army; Italian Expeditionary Corps in Russia
- Battles/wars: Italo-Turkish War; World War I; Solstice; Col Moschin; Second Italo-Abyssinian War; World War II; Balkans Campaign (World War II); Greco-Italian War; Invasion of Albania; Battle of Ponte Perati; German invasion of Greece; Italian–Soviet War; Operation Barbarossa; Battle of Petrikowka; Capture of Stalino; Capture of Gorlovka; Battle of Chazepetovka; Battle of Nikitovka; Christmas Battle (1941); Battles of Izyum; First Battle of Don; Tunisian Campaign; Battle of the Mareth Line; Battle of El Guettar; Battle of Medenine; Battle of Wadi Akarit; Operation Vulcan; Battle of Enfidaville; Operation Strike (POW); Italian Campaign (World War II)

Giovanni Messe (10 December 1883 – 18 December 1968) was an Italian field marshal and politician. In the Second World War, he was captured in Tunisia but made chief of staff of the Italian Co-belligerent Army after the armistice of September 1943. Later, he was an elected representative in the Italian Senate. He is considered by many to have been the best Italian general of the war.

== Early life and career ==
Messe was born in Mesagne, in the Province of Brindisi in the Apulia region of Italy on 10 December 1883. Giovanni Messe pursued a military career in 1901. He saw action in the Italian conquest of Libya and in the First World War. During this conflict, he gave an important contribution to the creation and training of the "Arditi", elite infantry units, and with the rank of maggiore was the commander of the IX Nono Reparto Arditi that fought in the zone of Monte Grappa. Emerging considerably decorated from these conflicts, he became aide-de-camp to King Victor Emmanuel III, holding this post from 1923 to 1927. From this date until 1935, Messe commanded a unit of Bersaglieri and held the rank of colonel.

=== Abyssinia ===
In September 1935, Messe assumed command of a motorised brigade in Verona, with the rank of brigadier general. Following a successful period of service with this unit in the Second Italo-Abyssinian War, Messe was promoted to rank of major general and he became commander of the 3rd Cavalry Division.

== World War II ==
In April 1939, following the Italian invasion of Albania, Messe was appointed to serve under Albania's governor, General Ubaldo Soddu.

=== Greece ===
From 19 December 1940, after Greek forces had launched a counterattack and moved into the southern parts of Italian-controlled Albania, Messe commanded the Special Army Corps. He achieved success in stopping the Greek counter-offensive toward the port of Valona, and the campaign turned into trench warfare.

In April 1941, with the help of the German Armed Forces (Wehrmacht), the Battle of Greece ended in an Axis victory.

=== Russia ===
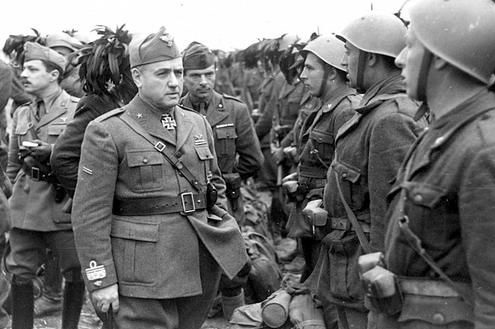
Giovanni Messe inspecting his troops in Russia

In other circumstances, the armoured warfare experience Messe possessed might have caused him to be given a command alongside Erwin Rommel in North Africa. But, instead, he was chosen to be the commander of the Italian Expeditionary Corps in Russia (Corpo di Spedizione Italiano in Russia, or CSIR). The CSIR was a mobile infantry and cavalry unit of the Italian army that took part in Operation Barbarossa, the Axis invasion of the Soviet Union.

Initially, the number of Italian troops in southern Russia numbered around 60,000. Messe never thought that this force was properly outfitted or supplied for the extreme conditions of the "Russian Front". By July 1942, the far larger Italian Army in Russia (Armata Italiana in Russia, or ARMIR) replaced the CSIR and General Italo Gariboldi replaced Messe. On 1 November 1942 Messe left Russia.

The number of Italian troops in Russia had grown to about 200,000. Although the troops fought well during the initial summer campaign, they lacked anti-tank weaponry suitable in winter conditions. During the German defeat at Stalingrad, the campaign in the Soviet Union turned heavily against the Axis powers. Alongside Romanian, Hungarian and German forces, the Italian army was severely mauled during Operation Saturn on the flanks of Stalingrad while trying to hold back the Soviet forces.

=== Tunisia ===
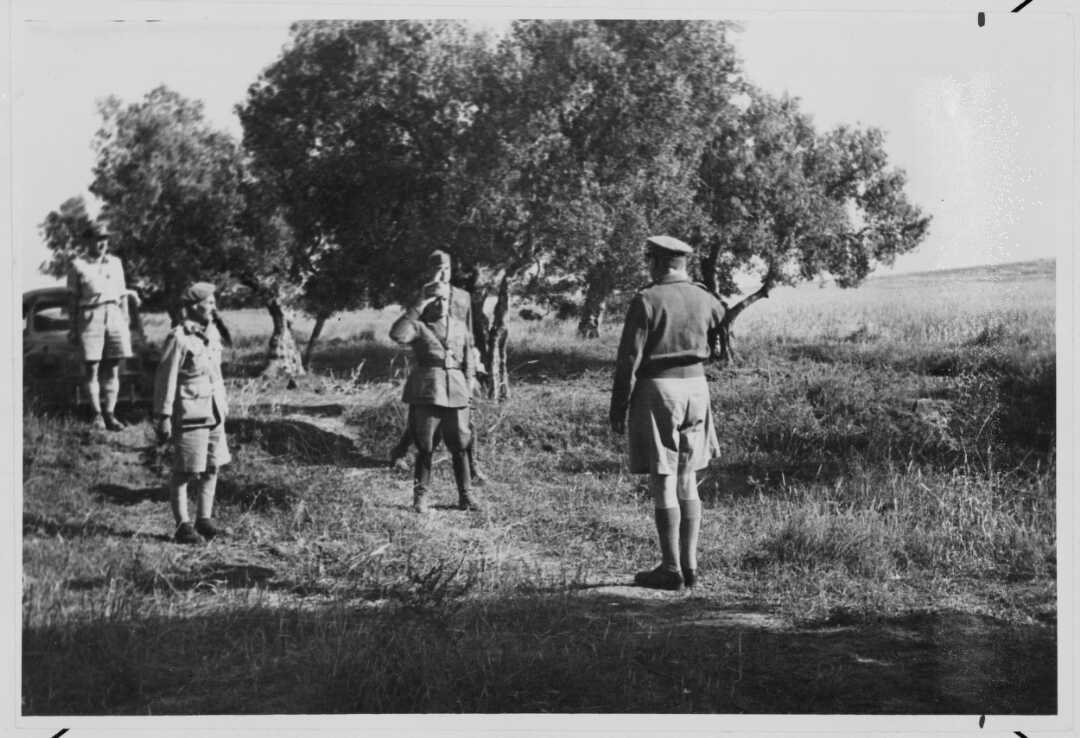
Messe surrenders to Lieutenant-General Sir Bernard Freyberg and Major General Douglas Graham on 13 May 1943

In February 1943, Messe was appointed as the new commander of the Italo-German Tank Army (Deutsch-Italienische Panzerarmee) formerly commanded by Erwin Rommel. The name was changed to 1st Italian Army in recognition of the fact that the army consisted of one German and three Italian corps. Rommel was promoted to the command of the new Army Group Africa (Heeresgruppe Afrika).

Messe fought a defensive campaign against the advancing British and allied forces, and was defeated at the Mareth Line. The lack of resources available to the general Messe could not prevent the inevitable defeat of the Axis in North Africa.

On 12 May 1943 Messe was promoted to the rank of marshal of Italy (Maresciallo d'Italia). The following day, the 5th German Tank Army collapsed with the fall of Tunis and the 1st Italian Army was surrounded, still holding the line at Enfidaville. Messe along with Kurt Freiherr von Liebenstein formally surrendered to British and New Zealand forces under General Bernard Freyberg.

=== Post-armistice ===
As a loyal supporter of the Royalist cause, like many Italian officers Messe soon found himself re-employed, when after the Italian armistice in September 1943, he was made chief of staff of the Italian Co-Belligerent Army (Esercito Cobelligerante Italiano), consisting of those units loyal to King Victor Emmanuel, many of which were reconstituted from Italian POWs and armed by the Allies. He served in this post with distinction until the war's end and then retired from the military in 1947 after 46 years of distinguished service.

== Life after the army ==
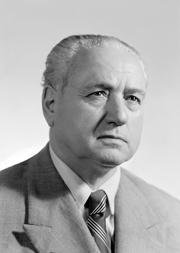
Giovanni Messe in 1953

After the war, Messe was one of the founders of "Armata Italiana della Libertà" (Italian Army of Liberty), an anti-Communist paramilitary that was joined by some fifty generals and admirals.

Messe wrote a book about his experiences, titled Come finì la guerra in Africa. La mia armata in Tunisia (How the war in Africa ended. My army in Tunisia). His military popularity remained with him in civilian life and from 1953 to 1955, Messe was a democratically elected representative in the Italian Senate. He was also president of the Italian Veterans Association, a post which he held until his death. His life was profiled in a biography written by Luigi Argentieri titled Messe—soggetto di un'altra storia (Messe—subject of another history) published in 1997.

Giovanni Messe died on 18 December 1968, at the age of eighty-five.

== Awards and decorations ==
Silver Medal of Military Valor – Gorizia, 21–23 May 1917

War Merit Cross – Albania, 19 June 1920

Promotion for War Merits – to Lieutenant General, Valona – Kalamas, 1940–1941

Promotion for War Merits – to Lieutenant Colonel, 1918

=== Foreign honors ===
Croce di Cavaliere della Croce di Ferro - ribbon for ordinary uniform

Knight's Cross of the Iron Cross
— 23 January 1942

Military offices
| Preceded by Ettore Bastico | Commander-in-Chief of Italian North Africa; 2 February 1943 – 13 May 1943 | Succeeded by No successor |
Government offices
| Preceded by Ettore Bastico | Governor-General of Italian Libya; 2 February 1943 – 4 February 1943 | Succeeded by No successor |
