= Light Transport Brigade (Independent State of Croatia) =

Light Transport Brigade Laki prijevozni zdrug Legione Croata Autotrasportabile
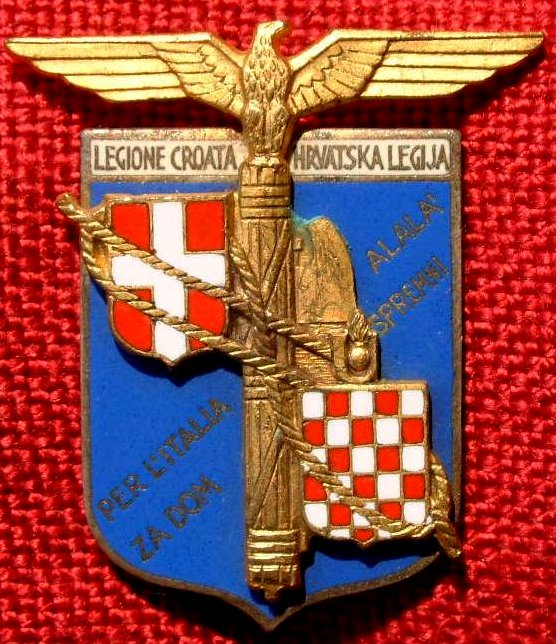
- Croatian Legion Badge
- Active: 26 July 1941–13 April 1943 (Destroyed in December 1942)
- Country: Independent State of Croatia
- Allegiance: Kingdom of Italy
- Branch: Royal Italian Army
- Size: ~1,200
- Mottos: hr: Za dom spremni it: Per l'Italia alalà
- Engagements: Case Blue; Battle of Stalingrad

Commanders
- Commander: Stjepan Neuberger (1941); Egon Žitnik (1941-1942)

The Light Transport Brigade (Croatian: Laki prijevozni zdrug, Italian: Legione Croata Autotrasportabile) was a military unit of the Independent State of Croatia's Croatian Home Guard which fought alongside the Royal Italian Army on the Eastern Front. It was attached to the 3rd Cavalry Division of the 8th Italian Army, which was in turn subordinate to the German Army Group B.

The legion was composed of about 1,215 volunteers divided into a battalion with three infantry Companies and a machine gunners company, as well as a mortar company with 81mm mod. 35 mortars and an anti-tank company with 47/32 anti-tank guns.

The unit was formed by Italian request in July 1941, after a meeting between Italian General Antonio Oxilio, delivering a letter from the Italian High Command, and Poglavnik Ante Pavelić. However, it remained in the Independent State of Croatia until December when it was finally moved to Italy. Upon completion of their training the unit was visited by Croatian field marshal Slavko Kvaternik in early 1941. By 16 April 1942 it arrived on the Eastern Front. It fought until December 1942 when it was destroyed by the Red Army around the Don River in the Battle of Stalingrad. The unit was commemorated with a stamp featuring a soldier in the Don region. Proceeds went to the families of legionnaires.

In 2008, 16 soldiers' remains were returned to Croatia.
