= Italian Expeditionary Corps in Russia =

World War 2 Italian Expeditionary forces in Russia

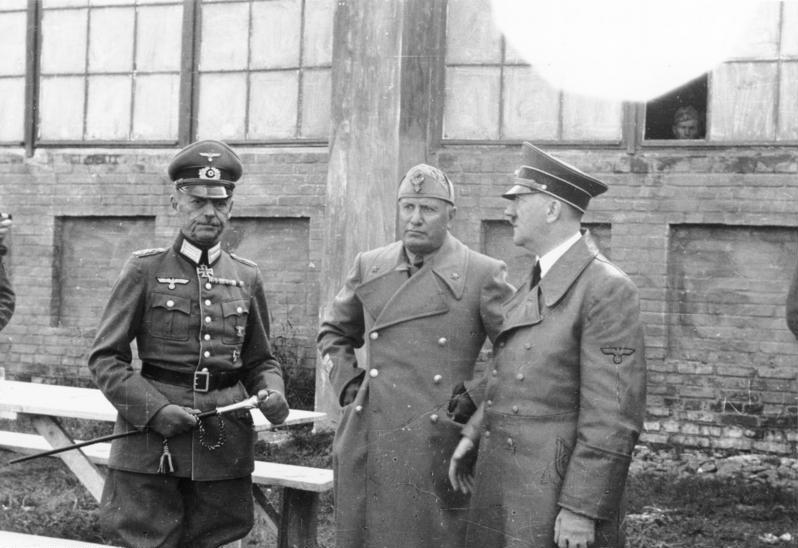
Gerd von Rundstedt, Commander-in-Chief of Army Group South, with Benito Mussolini and Adolf Hitler on the Eastern Front, 28 August 1941

During World War II, the Italian Expeditionary Corps in Russia (Italian: Corpo di Spedizione Italiano in Russia; CSIR) was a corps-sized expeditionary unit of the Regio Esercito (Royal Italian Army) that fought on the Eastern Front. In July 1942 the CSIR entered the newly formed Italian Army in Russia as XXXV Army Corps.

== Formation ==
The CSIR was formed in an attempt to provide a somewhat mobile unit to fight on a front where mobility was key. Two of the divisions were truck-moveable and one was a celere (fast) division, drawn from the reserve Army of the Po but this was more on paper than in reality. The CSIR was created by Italian dictator Benito Mussolini to show solidarity with Nazi Germany after German dictator Adolf Hitler launched Operation Barbarossa and attacked the Soviet Union. Mussolini created the CSIR, despite the lack of enthusiasm shown by Hitler, on 10 July 1941 and between July and August 1941, the units of the CSIR arrived in southern Russia. The CSIR included an Aviation Command (Comando Aviazione) with a limited number of fighters, bombers and transport aircraft. This command was part of the Regia Aeronautica (Italian Royal Air Force) and was also known as the Expeditionary Air Corps in Russia (Corpo Aereo Spedizione in Russia).

The CSIR was initially subordinated to the German 11th Army (General Eugen Ritter von Schobert). On 14 August 1941, the CSIR was transferred to the control of German Panzer Group 1 (General Ewald von Kleist). On 25 October 1941, Panzer Group 1 was renamed the 1st Panzer Army. The CSIR remained under von Kleist's command until 3 June 1942 when it was subordinated to the German 17th Army (General Richard Ruoff).

== Composition ==
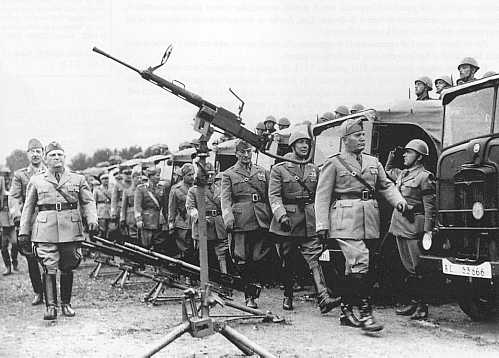
Mussolini inspecting members of the Italian Expeditionary Corps in Russia

The CSIR was composed of three divisions: 3rd Cavalry Division "Principe Amedeo Duca d'Aosta", 9th Infantry Division "Pasubio", and 52nd Infantry Division "Torino". Torino and Pasubio were semi-motorised divisions, with an assortment of commercial vehicles, with company logos intact, pressed into service. The Prince Amedeo Duke of Aosta Division was a combination of traditional saber wielding horse cavalry and motorized units, with much of the division's artillery horse-drawn. The highly-mobile riflemen (Bersaglieri) in this unit made use of motorcycles or bicycles.

The initial strength of the CSIR stood at about 3,000 officers and 59,000 men, 5,500 motor vehicles, 220 artillery pieces, 92 anti-tank guns, 83 aeroplanes and 4,600 horses and mules. The units of the CSIR were primarily lightly armed infantry, horse cavalry and mobile riflemen. The Torino and Pasubio divisions were each composed of two infantry regiments and a regiment of artillery. The Prince Amedeo Duke of Aosta Fast Division was composed of four regiments, the Regiment "Savoia Cavalleria" (3rd), Regiment "Lancieri di Novara" (5th), the 3rd Fast Artillery Regiment and the 3rd Bersaglieri Regiment. The units of the CSIR were a mixed bag and were transported by truck, horse, car, motorcycle, bicycle or as was the case all too often, on foot. While the Amedeo Duke of Aosta Division did include 60 obsolete tankettes and light tanks (Fiat L3 or Fiat L6/40), mostly in its one tank battalion, as well as anti-tank guns (Cannone da 47/32 M35), there was nothing in the Italian arsenal able to counter the numerous and technically superior Soviet tanks like the T-34/76 or KV I.

The Aviation Command of the CSIR had less than 100 Macchi C.200 Saetta (Lightning) fighters, Caproni Ca.311 light reconnaissance-bombers and Savoia-Marchetti SM.81 Pipistrello (Bat) tri-motor transports. The CSIR included the Special Intendancy East (Intendenza Speciale Est) which provided medical, commissariat, administration, artillery, chemical, horse and veterinary, transport, automotive, staging, mail and telegraphic services.

== Commanders ==
The CSIR's original commander was General Francesco Zingales. He fell ill in Vienna during the early stages of transport to Russia and on 14 July 1941, was replaced by General Giovanni Messe. Messe was never satisfied with the equipment and support available to the CSIR and pointed out the lack of adequate winter equipment. Therefore he was replaced in November 1942 by Francesco Zingales under whose command the Corps would be all but destroyed and returned to Italy in April 1943.

No.	Portrait	Commander	Took office	Left office	Time in office
1	Giovanni Messe	Major General; Giovanni Messe (1883–1968)	14 July 1941	1 November 1942	1 year, 110 days
2	Francesco Zingales	Lieutenant-General; Francesco Zingales (1884–1959)	1 November 1942	12 July 1943	242 days
3	Arturo Taranto	Lieutenant-General; Arturo Taranto (born 1880)	12 July 1943	27 July 1943	15 days
4	Alessandro Gloria	Lieutenant General; Alessandro Gloria (1883–1970)	27 July 1943	8 September 1943	43 days

== Operations ==
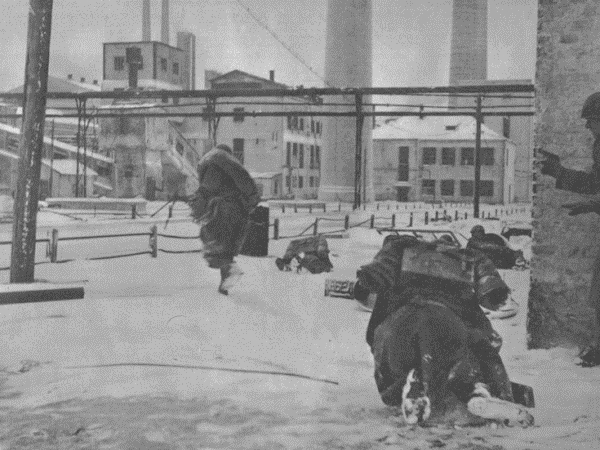
Italian soldiers of the CSIR attack Gorlovka on 2 November 1941

The CSIR was sent to the southern sector of the German advance in Ukraine in July 1941. In August, as part of the German 11th Army, the CSIR made its first contact with the Red Army. The CSIR pursued retreating Soviet troops between the Bug River and Dniester River. While the 11th Army conducted the Siege of Odessa, the CSIR was attached to Panzer Group 1. In its early encounters the CSIR was successful, taking a number of towns and cities and creating a favourable impression on its German allies. Its most notable early victory came at the Battle of Petrikowka in September 1941, where the Italians encircled some sizeable Red Army units, inflicting unknown casualties on them and capturing over 10,000 prisoners of war as well as significant numbers of weapons and horses. This cost 291 Italian casualties, 87 killed, 190 wounded and 14 missing. On October 20, the CSIR and the German XLIXth Mountain Corps captured the big industrial city of Stalino (now Donetsk) after determined resistance from the Soviet defenders. Units from the Pasubio Motorized Division captured the neighboring city of Gorlovka, an industrial town of around 100,000 inhabitants, on November 2. While the CSIR did not participate in the siege of Odessa, Italian troops assisted in the occupation of the Odessa area after the city fell on 16 October 1941.

With the onset of winter, the CSIR units began consolidating their occupation zone and preparing defensive works. In the last week of December, the 3rd Mobile Division was counter-attacked by Soviet forces and managed to repel the attacks long enough for the 1st Panzer Army to reinforce the sector and defeat the Soviet attack. The "Christmas Battle" was hailed as a great victory in Italy, though the division likely would have fallen without German support. It subsequently weathered the 1941–1942 winter quite well in its relatively quiet occupation zone.

The Charge of the Savoia Cavalleria at Izbushensky was a clash between the Italian cavalry Regiment "Savoia Cavalleria" (3rd) and the Soviet 812th Rifle Regiment (304th Rifle Division) that took place on 24 August 1942, near the hamlet (khutor) of Izbushensky (Избушенский), close to the junction between the Don and Khopyor rivers. Though a minor skirmish in the theatre of operation of the Eastern Front, the Izbushensky charge had great propaganda resonance in Italy and it is still remembered as one of the last significant cavalry charges in history.

== Italian Army in the Soviet Union ==
In July 1942, the CSIR was incorporated into the far larger Italian Army in Russia (ARMIR, Armata Italiana in Russia) when Mussolini decided to expand the Italian presence in the Soviet Union. The three divisions of the CSIR all became part of the ARMIR XXXV Army Corps.

== Bibliography ==
- Faldella, Emilio. L'Italia nella seconda guerra mondiale. Cappelli Bologna 1959 (Italian)
- Jowett, Philip S. The Italian Army 1940-45 (1): Europe 1940–1943. Osprey, Oxford - New York, 2000. ISBN 978-1-85532-864-8
- Mack Smith, Denis. Le guerre del duce. Laterza, Bari 1979 (Italian)
- Messe, Giovanni. La guerra al fronte Russo. Il Corpo di Spedizione Italian (CSIR). Milano 1947 (Italian)
- Neulen, Hans-Werner (April 2000). "Macchi dans la neige, ou l'Intermezzo ukrainien de la Regia Aeronautica" [Macchi in the Snow, or the Royal Italian Air Force's Ukrainian Intermezzo]. Avions: Toute l'Aéronautique et son histoire (in French) (85): 6–16. ISSN 1243-8650.
- Neulen, Hans-Werner (May 2000). "Macchi dans la neige, ou l'Intermezzo ukrainien de la Regia Aeronautica". Avions: Toute l'Aéronautique et son histoire (in French) (86): 35–43. ISSN 1243-8650.
- Müller, Rolf-Dieter (2014). The Unknown Eastern Front: The Wehrmacht and Hitler's Foreign Soldiers. London/New York: I.B. Tauris. ISBN 978-1-78076-890-8.
