= Bolognesi =

Bolognesi may refer to:

- BAP Coronel Bolognesi, four ships of the Peruvian Navy
- Bolognesi, Peru, Tahuanía District, Ucayali Region, Peru
- Bolognesi Airport, Tahuanía District, Ucayali Region, Peru
- Bolognesi District, Pallasca Province, Ancash Region, Peru
- Bolognesi Province, Ancash Region, Peru
- Coronel Bolognesi, Peruvian football club

== People with the surname ==
- Aureliano Bolognesi (born 1930), Italian boxer
- Francisco Bolognesi (1816–1880), Peruvian military hero
- Gaia Bolognesi (born 1980), Italian actress
- Gemma Bolognesi (1894–1983), Italian actress
- Jose Bolognesi, Brazilian footballer
- Maria Bolognesi (1924–1980), Roman Catholic Italian layperson
- Luiz Bolognesi (born 1966), Brazilian screenwriter
- Marco Bolognesi, Italian artist

== See also ==
- Bologna (disambiguation)
- Bolognese (disambiguation)
