= Boulogne (disambiguation) =

Boulogne most commonly refers to Boulogne-sur-Mer, a city in northern France by the English Channel.

Boulogne may also refer to:

== Places and geography ==
=== Argentina ===
- Boulogne Sur Mer, a town in Buenos Aires Province

=== France ===
- Boulogne (river), a river in western France
- Boulogne, Vendée, a former commune in western France now part of Essarts-en-Bocage
- Boulogne-Billancourt, a commune near Paris
  - Bois de Boulogne, a park in Paris bordering Boulogne-Billancourt
- County of Boulogne, an historic county centered on Boulogne-sur-Mer
  - Boulogne-sur-Mer, a French coastal city.

=== United States ===
- Boulogne, a small town in Florida

== Other ==
- Boulogne (surname)
- US Boulogne, a French football team in Boulogne-sur-Mer

== See also ==
- Boullogne, a French surname
- Bononia (disambiguation)
- Bologne (disambiguation)
- Bologna (disambiguation)
