= Bologna (disambiguation) =

Bologna is a city in Italy.

Bologna may also refer to:

== Places ==
- the Province of Bologna
- Bologne, Haute-Marne, France

== Surname ==
- Andrea da Bologna, Italian painter
- Antonio Beccadelli di Bologna (1475–1513), Italian aristocrat
- Bartolomeo da Bologna (1405–1427), Italian composer
- Cristoforo da Bologna, Italian painter
- David Bologna (born 1994), American actor
- Domenico Bologna (1845–1885), Italian painter
- Enrique Bologna (born 1982), Argentine footballer
- Ferdinando Bologna (1925–2019), Italian art critic
- Giambologna (1529–1608), Italian sculptor otherwise (incorrectly) known as Giovanni da Bologna
- Giuseppe Bologna (1634–1697), Italian archbishop
- Jack Bologna (1775–1846), Italian actor
- Jacopo da Bologna (fl 1340–1360), Italian composer
- Joseph Bologna (1934–2017), American actor
- Joe Bologna, American musician and member of various Beatles tribute bands, such as 1964, The Fab Four, and Rain
- Julie Bologna, American television meteorologist
- Ludovico da Bologna (1431/1454–1479), Italian diplomat and churchman
- Maria Beccadelli di Bologna (1848–1929), Italian salon-holder
- Michele de Bologna (1647–1731), Italian Roman Catholic archbishop
- Michele di Matteo da Bologna (died 1469), Italian painter
- Niccolò da Bologna (1325–1403), Italian illuminator
- Orazio Antonio Bologna (born 1945), Italian author
- Paola Bologna (1898–1960), Italian tennis player
- Paul Bologna, American politician
- Ugo Bologna (1917–1998), Italian actor
- Vitale da Bologna (1289–1361), Italian painter

== Other ==
- the 1980 Bologna massacre
- Bologna declaration
  - Bologna Process in European higher education, named for the declaration
- Bologna sausage
- Bologna (Rome Metro)
- Bologna F.C. 1909, a major association football club based in Bologna, Italy
- 25 Motorised Division Bologna an infantry division of Italy during World War II

== See also ==
- Baloney (disambiguation)
- Bologne (disambiguation)
- Bolognese (disambiguation)
- Bologa
- Balogna
- Boulogne (disambiguation)
