= Bentivoglio, Emilia-Romagna =

Bentivoglio
- Comune
- Comune di Bentivoglio
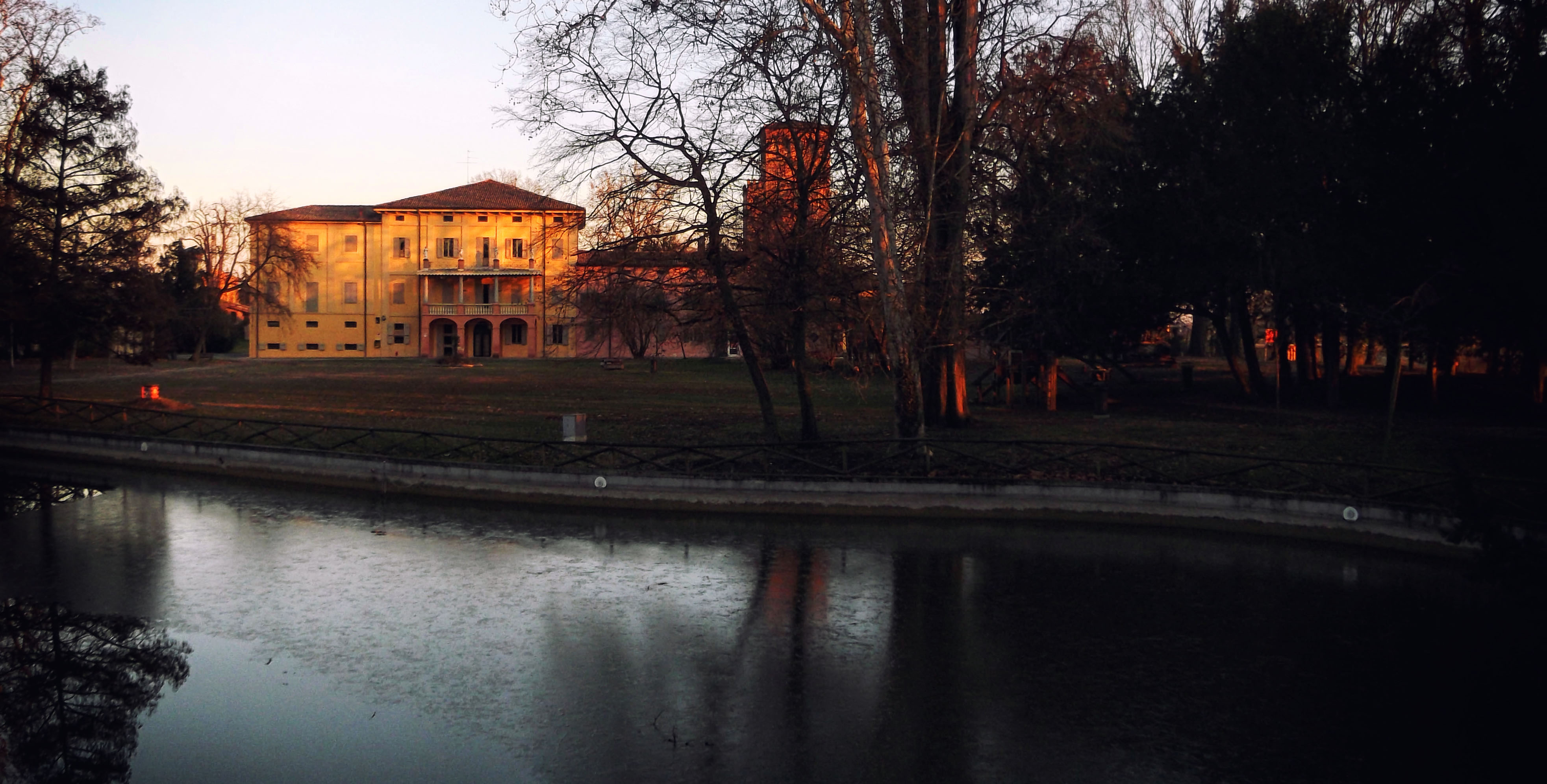
- Villa Smeraldi.

- Location within Italy Location within Emilia-Romagna
- Coordinates: 44°38′N 11°25′E
- Country: Italy
- Region: Emilia-Romagna
- Metropolitan city: Bologna (BO)

Government
  - Mayor: Erika Ferranti

Area
  - Total: 51.1 km^{2} (19.7 sq mi)
- Elevation: 19 m (62 ft)

Population (30 April 2017)
  - Total: 5,495
  - Density: 108/km^{2} (279/sq mi)
- Demonym: Bentivogliesi
- Time zone: UTC+1 (CET)
  - Summer (DST): UTC+2 (CEST)
- Postal code: 40010
- Dialing code: 051
- Website: Official website

Bentivoglio (Northern Bolognese: Bäntvói or Bentvói) is a comune (municipality) in the Metropolitan City of Bologna in the Italian region of Emilia-Romagna, located about 15 kilometres (9 mi) northeast of Bologna.

Bentivoglio borders the following municipalities: Argelato, Castel Maggiore, Granarolo dell'Emilia, Malalbergo, Minerbio, San Giorgio di Piano, San Pietro in Casale.

== History ==
=== Origins and Roman period ===
The earliest settlements in the territory of Bentivoglio date back to the Villanovan culture, as evidenced by cremation tombs from the 10th century BC and a 6th-century BC stele. During the Roman period, the first land reclamation works were undertaken.

Archaeological excavations carried out in the Interporto area have uncovered a section of a Roman road approximately 8 metres wide, tentatively identified with the Via Annia (or *Via Emilia Altinate*), which connected Bononia (modern Bologna) with Aquileia and the north-eastern regions of Italy. The continuity of settlement in the area is further attested by the discovery of a Gothic-era necropolis (6th century AD) aligned with the ancient Roman road.

=== Middle Ages ===
In the Middle Ages, the central area of the territory was known as "Ponte Poledrano" (Latin: Pons Puledri), a name derived from the passage of foals across a bridge over the Navile canal. The canal, which linked Bologna with Ferrara and the Adriatic Sea, became a key economic artery for trade.

In 1352, the construction of a hydraulic mill was authorized, and in 1390 the Comune of Bologna built a fortress (rocca) with a watchtower to defend its northern frontier against the expansion of the Este family.

=== Bentivoglio lordship ===
In 1460, Sante Bentivoglio acquired the fortress. Between 1475 and 1481, Giovanni II Bentivoglio transformed it into the *Domus Jucunditatis*, a Renaissance country residence intended for leisure and hunting.

The complex became the centre of an advanced agricultural estate, celebrated in the fresco cycle known as the "Stories of Bread", possibly inspired by the agronomic treatise of Pietro de' Crescenzi. The cycle illustrates the stages of grain production and symbolises the family's control over food supply.

In 1502, the residence hosted Lucrezia Borgia during her journey to Ferrara for her marriage to Alfonso I d'Este.

=== From decline to modernisation ===
Following the fall of the Bentivoglio family in 1506, the area experienced a long period of decline. In 1889, Marquis Carlo Alberto Pizzardi acquired the estate and initiated a programme of agricultural and industrial modernisation.

With the support of the restorer Alfonso Rubbiani, Pizzardi restored the castle and promoted the development of infrastructure, including the construction of the Consorziale Hospital (1906) and Palazzo Rosso (1889–1899), a notable example of Art Nouveau architecture in the Bologna area.

=== Contemporary period ===
In 1945, during the German retreat in World War II, the medieval tower and part of the historic mill were destroyed.

Since 1971, the castle has housed research laboratories of the Ramazzini Institute.

In 1973, the Museum of Peasant Civilisation (Museo della Civiltà Contadina) was established in the hamlet of San Marino, within Villa Smeraldi. The museum is one of the most important institutions in the region dedicated to preserving rural traditions and agricultural heritage.

From the 1990s onwards, the conversion of former rice fields led to the creation of the Oasi La Rizza, a protected natural area of over 34 hectares dedicated to biodiversity conservation and wetland birdlife.

== Main sights ==
- Villa Smeraldi, housing the Museum of Peasant Civilization (Museo della civiltà contadina).
- San Martino di Castagnolo Minore.
- Bentivoglio Castle (Castello di Bentivoglio), originally a medieval fortress and later transformed into a Renaissance residence by Giovanni II Bentivoglio.
- Palazzo Rosso, a late 19th-century building associated with the development promoted by Carlo Alberto Pizzardi.
- Navile canal, a historic waterway that played a key role in the economic development of the area.
- Oasi La Rizza, a protected wetland area dedicated to biodiversity and birdlife conservation.
