= 2nd Pontieri Engineer Regiment =

Active Italian Army bridge engineer unit

- 2° Reggimento Genio Pontieri
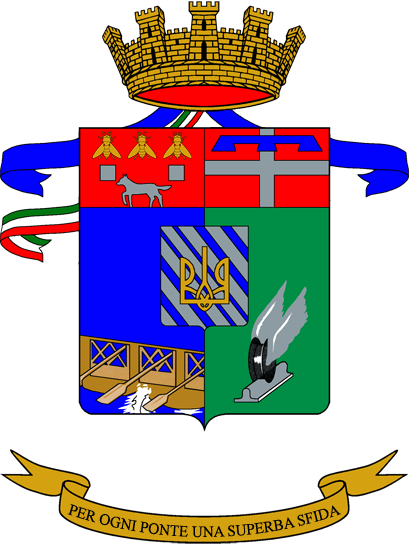
- Regimental coat of arms
- Active: 1 Jan. 1883 — 8 Sept. 1943; 15 Dec. 1949 — today
- Country: Italy
- Branch: Italian Army
- Role: Combat engineers
- Part of: Engineer Command
- Garrison/HQ: Piacenza
- Motto: "Per ogni ponte una superba sfida"
- Anniversaries: 24 June 1918 - Second Battle of the Piave River
- Decorations: 2× Bronze Medals of Military Valor; 1× Silver Medal of Civil Valor; 1× Gold Cross of Army Merit

Insignia
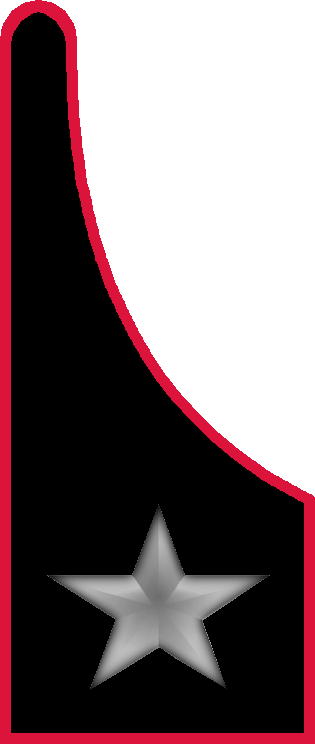
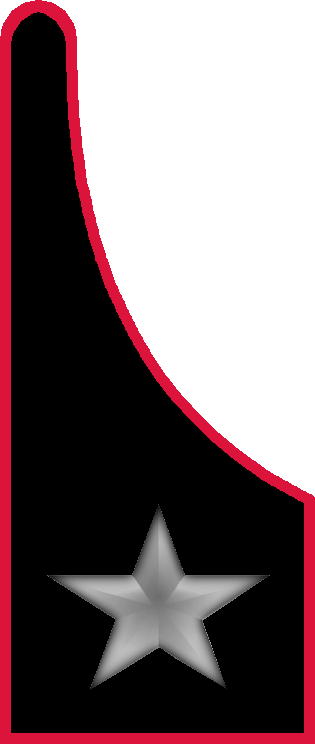
- Pontieri gorget patches

The 2nd Pontieri Engineer Regiment (Italian: 2° Reggimento Genio Pontieri) is a military engineering regiment of the Italian Army based in Piacenza in the Emilia Romagna. The regiment is assigned to the army's Engineer Command and the Italian Army's only unit focusing on operational level water crossings. The term "Pontieri" comes from the Italian word for bridge (Italian: Ponte) and is used to denote units of the Italian Army's engineer arm tasked with the construction and repair of bridges. Enlisted personnel in such units is addressed by the singular form: "Pontiere". The regiment was formed in 1883 as an engineer regiment, which united all Pontieri companies of the Royal Italian Army. During World War I the regiment formed battalions and companies, which operated along the Italian Front. In 1933, the regiment was split into the 1st Pontieri Regiment (Light Bridges) and 2nd Pontieri Regiment (Heavy Bridges). During World War II the regiment formed battalions and smaller units, which were deployed on all fronts. After the announcement of the Armistice of Cassibile on 8 September 1943, the regiment was disbanded by invading German forces. In 1949, the regiment was reformed and has been active since. The regiment's anniversary falls, as for all engineer units, on 24 June 1918, the last day of the Second Battle of the Piave River.

== History ==
On 1 January 1883, the Royal Italian Army formed the 4th Engineer Regiment in Piacenza. The 1st Engineer Regiment and 2nd Engineer Regiment transferred both four Pontieri companies and one train company to the new regiment. The 2nd Engineer Regiment also transferred its 14th Sappers Company (Lagunari), which was based in Venice and tasked with operating in the Venetian Lagoon, Marano Lagoon, and Grado Lagoon. Upon entering the new regiment the two train companies were reorganized into four train companies, while the 14th Sappers Company (Lagunari) split to form two Lagunari companies. The 1st Pontieri Company, which arrived from the 2nd Engineer Regiment, had distinguished itself during the First Italian War of Independence at the Siege of Peschiera and been awarded a Bronze Medal of Military Valor. Upon entering the new regiment the medal was affixed to the regiment's flag.

On 23 June 1887, the regiment was renamed 4th Engineer Regiment. On 1 November of the same year, the regiment transferred a train company to the 3rd Engineer Regiment, which in turn transferred its Ferrovieri brigade, which consisted of four Ferrovieri companies based in Turin, to the 4th Engineer Regiment. The 4th Engineer Regiment consisted afterwards of a staff, three Pontieri brigades (with eight companies), a Ferrovieri brigade (with four companies), a Lagunari brigade (with two companies), three train companies, and a depot.

On 1 July 1895, the Ferrovieri brigade in Turin became an autonomous unit, which, on 9 August 1910, was used to form the 6th Engineer Regiment (Ferrovieri). During the same year engineer units' brigades were renamed battalions and, on 1 November 1895, the 4th Engineer Regiment was renamed 4th Engineer Regiment (Pontieri). Also during the same year the regiment provided five officers and 15 enlisted for units deployed to Eritrea for the First Italo-Ethiopian War. In 1911-12, the regiment provided three officers and 793 enlisted for units deployed for the Italo-Turkish War.

=== World War I ===
In May 1915, shortly before Italy's entry into World War I the regiment consisted of 15 Pontieri companies, which were attached to armies and army corps along the Italian Front. During the war the regiment's depot continued to form battalions and companies, which fought in all sectors of the front. In total the regiment formed an additional six Pontieri battalion commands and 23 Pontieri companies, six Lagunari companies, two siege park companies, a river guides company, a hydraulic operators company, four bridge sections for cavalry, and three territorial militia companies. The regiment's units fought in eleven battles on the Isonzo river. After the disastrous Battle of Caporetto Pontieri units built pontoon bridges over the Torre and Tagliamento rivers to allow the Italian 3rd Army to escape the Austro-Hungarian Army's advance. During the First Battle of the Piave River and Second Battle of the Piave River, which were fought along the lower Piave river, the regiment's Pontieri and Lagunari units played a decisive role. In October and November 1918, during the decisive Battle of Vittorio Veneto the regiment's Pontieri companies built the pontoon bridges across the Piave river, which allowed the Royal Italian Army to defeat the Austro-Hungarian Army's 5th Army and 6th Army.

==== 8th Engineer Regiment (Lagunari) ====
On 28 August 1918, the 8th Engineer Regiment (Lagunari) was formed in Ferrara and all units of this engineer speciality were transferred from the 4th Engineer Regiment (Pontieri) to the new regiment. The new regiment consisted of a command, the I Lagunari Battalion in Venice with the 9th, 15th, 20th, and 23rd Lagunari companies, and the II Lagunari Battalion with the 10th, 21st, 22nd, and 24th Lagunari companies in Ferrara. In October 1918, the regiment formed the 1st Train Company and the same month the regiment's companies were heavily engaged in the Piave river delta during the decisive Battle of Vittorio Veneto. In November 1918, the regiment moved to Venice, where it was disbanded on 21 November 1919. On the same date, the regiment's only remaining Lagunari battalion with its two Lagunari companies was transferred to the 4th Engineer Regiment (Pontieri), which changed its name on the same day to Pontieri and Lagunari Engineer Regiment.

=== Interwar years ===
At the end of 1918, the 4th Engineer Regiment (Pontieri) still had six battalions and 26 companies, as well as the four four bridge sections for cavalry, deployed along the former war zone to repair damaged bridges. On 21 November 1919, the 8th Engineer Regiment (Lagunari) was disbanded and the regiment's only remaining Lagunari battalion was transferred to the 4th Engineer Regiment (Pontieri), which changed its name on the same day to Pontieri and Lagunari Engineer Regiment. Afterwards the regiment consisted of a command, three Pontieri battalions, a Lagunari battalion in Venice, and a depot.

On 1 March 1926, the regiment was renamed Pontieri and Lagunari Regiment and, on 31 December of the same year, consisted of a command, the I and III Pontieri battalions in Piacenza, the II Pontieri battalion in Verona, the IV Pontieri battalion in Rome, the V Lagunari battalion in Venice, and depot.

On 15 May 1933, the regiment was split into the 1st Pontieri Regiment (Light Bridges) and 2nd Pontieri Regiment (Heavy Bridges). The 1st Pontieri Regiment, which was based in Verona, received the II Pontieri Battalion in Verona, IV Pontieri Battalion in Rome, and V Lagunari Battalion in Venice. The 2nd Pontieri Regiment, which retained the flag and traditions of the Pontieri and Lagunari Regiment, received the I and III Pontieri battalions in Piacenza.

In 1935, the regiment formed the following units in preparation for the Second Italo-Ethiopian War:

- three special Pontieri companies (one for Somalia and two for Eritrea)
- one Pontieri Company (for Libya)
- one special Pontieri unit (for Somalia)
- one special truck-transported Pontieri unit (for Somalia)

On 10 January 1936, the regiment formed the III Mixed Pontieri Battalion, which was meant to support 32nd Motorized Division "Trento". In December of the same year, the regiment formed the 7th, 8th, 9th Pontieri companies, which were sent to augment units deployed in Ethiopia. On 1 October 1938, the regiment's two battalions were reorganized and afterwards the I Battalion consisted of two light bridges companies and a heavy bridges company, while the II Battalion consisted of a light bridges company and a heavy bridges company.

=== World War II ===
During World War II the regiment's depot in Piacenza mobilized the following units:

- I, XXXI, XXXII, and XXXVII Pontieri battalions (light bridges)
- XXXII Pontieri Battalion (heavy bridges)
- XXIII Pontieri Battalion (light truck-transported bridges)
- and dozens of autonomous Pontieri companies and sections

In summer 1941, the I Pontieri Battalion was assigned to the Italian Expeditionary Corps in Russia, with which the battalion deployed to the Eastern Front in Ukraine. In September 1941, the battalion repaired a 1,422 yd (1,300 m) long Soviet pontoon bridge over the Dnipro river at Dnipro under enemy fire. For this and its conduct during the Italian campaign in the Soviet Union the I Pontieri Battalion was awarded a Bronze Medal of Military Valor, which was affixed to the regiment's flag and added to the regiment's coat of arms.

In the evening of 8 September 1943, the Armistice of Cassibile, which ended hostilities between the Kingdom of Italy and the Anglo-American Allies, was announced by General Dwight D. Eisenhower on Radio Algiers and by Marshal Pietro Badoglio on Italian radio. Germany reacted by invading Italy and the 2nd Pontieri Regiment was disbanded soon thereafter by German forces.

=== Cold War ===
On 15 December 1949, the 2nd Pontieri Engineer Regiment was reformed in Piacenza and assigned to the Tuscan-Emilian Military Region. The reformed regiment consisted of a command, command platoon, a pontieri battalion with one training company and one operations company, a Ferrovieri battalion with two dismountable metal bridges companies based in Castel Maggiore, a railway operations company based in Turin, and a park company. The Railway Operations Company operated the Chivasso–Ivrea–Aosta railway.

In 1950, the regiment began a tradition to erect the temporary bridge for the yearly Festa del Redentore in Venice. The tradition continued until the end of obligatory military service in 2000. In 1951, the regiment expanded its command platoon to command company. In November 1951, the regiment was deployed to support the civilians population after the Polesine floods, for which the regiment was awarded a Silver Medal of Civil Valor, which was affixed to the regiment's flag.

On 1 March 1953, the regiment formed the II Pontieri Battalion in Legnano and the III Pontieri Battalion in Piacenza. On 1 January 1954, the Ferrovieri Battalion became an autonomous unit, which was expanded to Ferrovieri Engineer Regiment on 1 October 1957. On the same day, the II Pontieri Battalion in Legnano and the Railway Operations Company in Turin were transferred to the Ferrovieri Engineer Regiment. On 1 February 1964, the II Pontieri Battalion returned to the 2nd Pontieri Engineer Regiment. On 6 September 1974, the I Pontieri Battalion in Piacenza and the II Pontieri Battalion in Legnano switched numbers, and on the same day the new II Pontieri Battalion in Piacenza was reduced to a reserve unit.

During the 1975 army reform the regiment was assigned to the Engineering Inspectorate and its organization at the time was as follows:

- 2nd Pontieri Engineer Regiment, in Piacenza
  - Command and Services Platoon, in Piacenza
  - 1st Pontieri Battalion, in Legnago
  - 2nd Pontieri Battalion (Reserve), in Piacenza
  - 3rd Pontieri Battalion, in Piacenza

=== Recent times ===
On 22 September 1992, the regiment's 1st Pontieri Battalion in Legnano became an autonomous unit and was assigned to the Northeastern Military Region. The autonomous battalion was assigned the flag and traditions of the 1st Pontieri Regiment and renamed 1st Pontieri Engineer Battalion. On 31 August 1995, the battalion was renamed 5th Engineer Battalion "Bolsena" and the flag of the 1st Pontieri Regiment was returned to the Shrine of the Flags in the Vittoriano in Rome for safekkeping.

On 1 December 1997, the 2nd Pontieri Engineer Regiment was transferred from the Tuscan-Emilian Military Region to the army's Engineer Grouping, which on 10 September 2010, was reorganized as Engineer Command.

After the August 2016 earthquake in Central Italy the regiment's companies deployed to the area to assist in the recovery efforts and to provide engineering services to the affected communities. The companies returned to the regiment's base in April 2017. For its service after the earthquake the regiment was awarded a Gold Cross of Army Merit, which was affixed to the regiment's flag.

== Organization ==
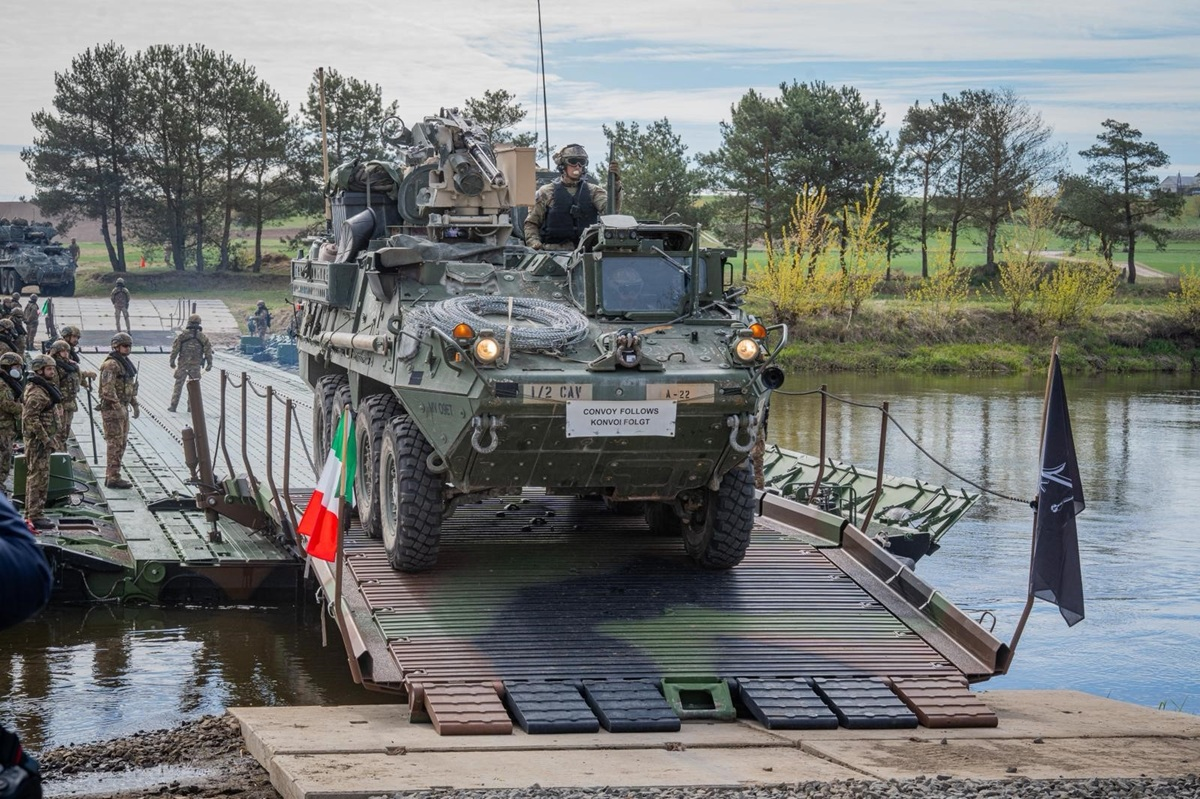
US Army 1st Squadron, 2nd Cavalry Regiment Stryker vehicles crossing a 2nd Pontieri Engineer Regiment pontoon bridge during exercise "Saber Strike 2026" in Poland

As of 2026 the 2nd Pontieri Engineer Regiment is organized as follows:

- 2nd Pontieri Engineer Regiment, in Piacenza
  - Command and Logistic Support Company
  - 1st Battalion
    - 1st Bridges Company
    - 2nd Bridges Company
    - Special Equipment and Construction Company
    - Road and Earthworks Company
  - EOD Platoon

The two bridge companies are equipped with French Motorized Floating Bridges, while the other two companies are equipped with a variety of cranes, excavators, etc.
