= Engineer Command (Italy) =

- Comando Genio
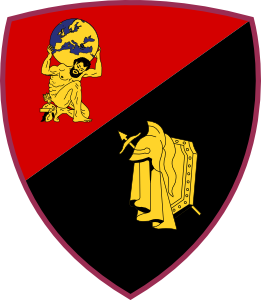
- Coat of arms of the Engineer Command
- Active: 10 September 2010 - present
- Country: Italy
- Branch: Italian Army
- Type: Engineers
- Role: Training; Doctrine elaboration Operational preparadness
- Part of: Operational Land Forces Support Command
- Garrison/HQ: Roma Cecchignola
- Anniversaries: 24 June 1918

Commanders
- Current commander: Gen. D. Gianpaolo Mirra

Insignia
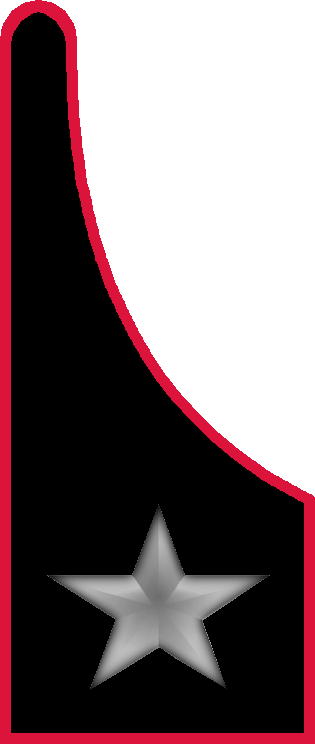
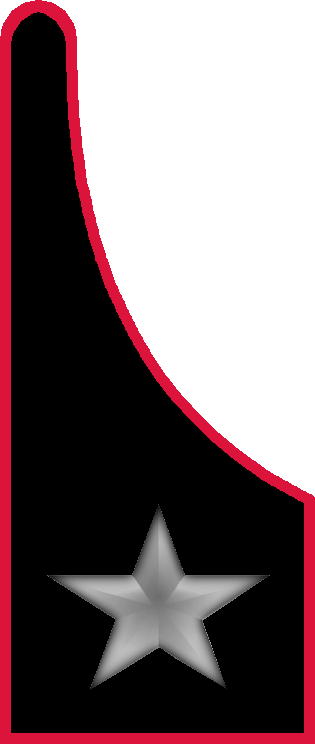
- Engineer arm gorget patches

The Engineer Command (Italian: Comando Genio) in Rome-Cecchignola commands the specialized engineer regiments of the Italian Army and it is tasked with training of all officers and troops destined for engineer units, as well as with both doctrinal and operational tasks.

The Engineer Command was established in 2010 and underwent a series of reorganizations, shifting from a Brigade-level command to a Division-level element. Nowadays, it keeps the traditions and the honours of the Arm of Engineers, and its commander is the Inspector of the Arm of the Engineers.

== History ==
The Engineer Command of the Italian Army was established on 10 September 2010, but it traces its origins back to the Engineer Brigade (based in Udine) and the Engineer School in Rome.

=== Engineer School ===
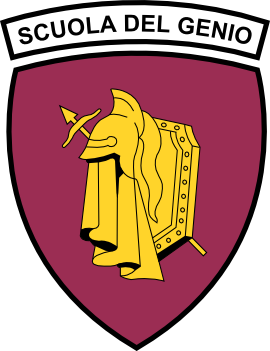
Engineers School (1950–2010) shoulder patch.

The Pioneers Engineer School was established on 10 March 1950 in Rome. However, the School was heir to two further training institutes: the Central Engineer School and the Reserve Officers School of Engineers.

The Engineers Central School was established in Manziana as a result of the decree of 18 January 1920 (moved to Civitavecchia in 1925). The School had the task of training the non-commissioned officers and training the troops in the various specialties of the Engineers: sappers, miners, cable operators, photoelectricists, telegraphers and radiotelegraphers. The School also held refresher courses for senior officers and captains about to be promoted as well as training courses for reserve officers called back in service.

The School of Engineer Reserve officer cadets of was created by decree of 1 May 1930 in Verona (moved to Pavia in 1936).

The Italian Civil War forced both two schools to suspend their activities. In 1944 three training bodies were established:

- Italian School of Radio-Telegraph Connections in Nocera Inferiore;
- Telegraph School in Francavilla Fontana;
- 232nd Workers Battalion in Bracciano.

In 1948 the School reopened the courses for Reserve officer cadets. In January 1949, a Specialized Battalion and the Reserve officer cadets Company were transferred to Rome Cecchignola in the “Ettore ROSSO” barracks, giving life to the training nucleus of the Pioneers Engineer School established there on 10 March 1950.

In March 1954 a Training Battalion based in Civitavecchia was assigned to the School. The Battalion was tasked with training conscripts. The School also had the task of training the first nuclei of the Italian special forces for the pioneering part. In November 1955, the Battalion stationed in Civitavecchia was transferred to Rome to the "Bazzani" Barracks, also to the Cecchignola, and subsequently in November 1961 to the "E. Rosso ”where it assumed the name of III Specialized Battalion.

=== Engineers Brigade ===
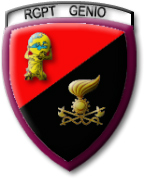
Engineers Grouping Command shoulder patch.

The Engineers Brigade was formed, as Engineers Grouping Command, on 1 December 1997, by transforming the pre-existing Engineers Command of the 5th Army Corps. Assigned to the Operational Land Forces Support Command, the Engineers Grouping Command controlled:

- 6th Pioneer Regiment;
- 11th Engineer Regiment;
- 21st Engineer Regiment;
- 2nd Pontieri Engineer Regiment;
- 5th Engineer Battalion "Bolsena".

In the nineties it took over the Ferrovieri Engineers Regiment. At the end of the decade the Brigade lost the 11th and 21st Pioneer Engineers Regiments and the 5th Battalion.

The Engineer Brigade provided disaster relief and reconstruction support in natural and man-made emergencies in Italy.

=== Engineer Command ===
The Engineer Command of the Italian Army was established on 10 September 2010 as one star-rank command under the Support Command of the Land Operational Forces (SUPPORTI FOTER). On 1 February 2011, the Obstacle Training Center was renamed to the C-IED National Center of Excellence.

On 1 January 2013, the Support Command of the Land Operational Forces was suppressed. Consequently, the Engineers Command passed directly under the Land Operational Forces Command. On 1 October 2016, the Engineers Command passed under the command of the newly established Operational Land Forces Support Command, with a simultaneous reduction in rank from division to brigade.

On 1 July 2020, the Engineer Command was reorganized. The Command was raised again to Divisional Command, with two new Brigade-level units:

- Engineer Brigade, with training and operational tasks;
- Infrastructure Command, for the execution of public works related to the Army.

== Mission ==
The Engineers Command has the task of:

- Prepare the necessary assets to support the maneuvering forces in operations;
- Ensuring the execution of emergency interventions in favor of populations affected by events of public disasters.
- Carry out specialty training activities and in the EOD and/or IEDD and Force Protection sectors.
- Provide for the development of the employment and technical doctrine, as well as for the development of studies.
- Ensure the efficiency of the infrastructural park used by the Italian Army.
- Provide the address for the qualification, specialization, updating, professionalization and employment of the personnel of the Arm of Engineer and the Corps of Engineers (infrastructure specialty).

== Structure ==
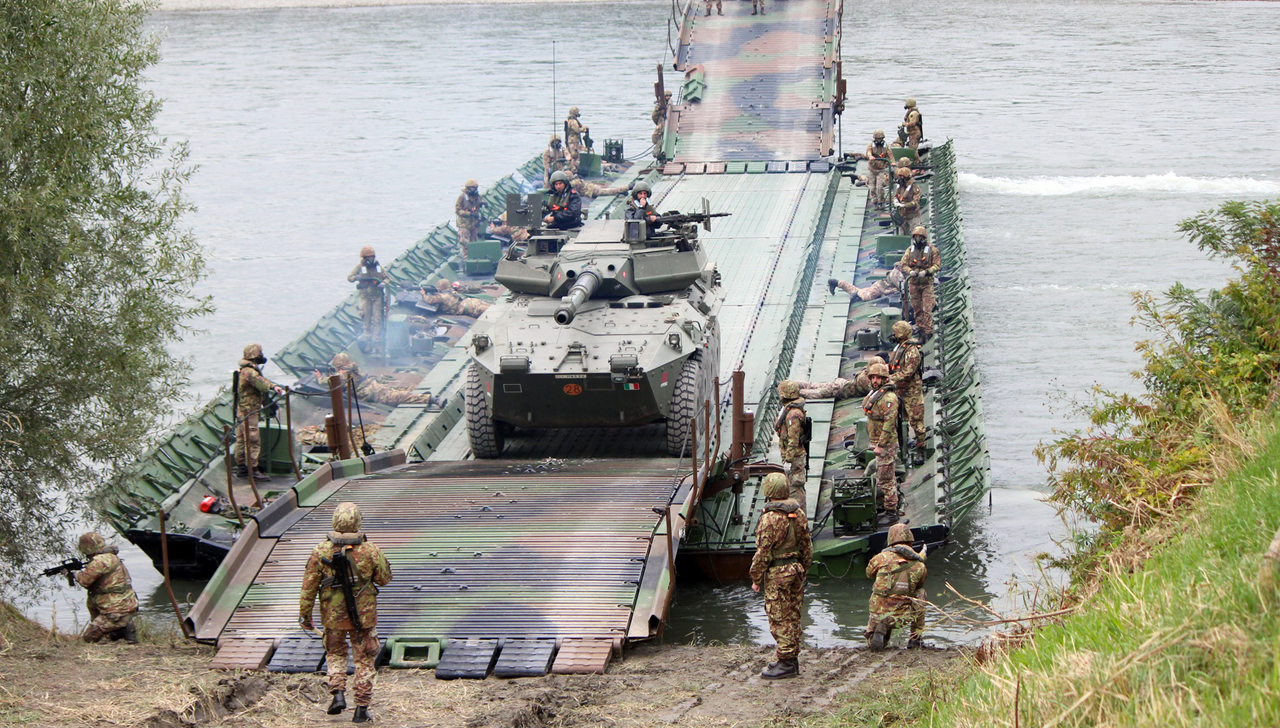
2nd Bridge Engineer Regiment ferrying a Regiment "Savoia Cavalleria" (3rd) Centauro tank destroyer across the Po

With the 2020 reorganization, the Engineer Command oversees two one-star rank commands, the Engineer Brigade and the Infrastructure Command.

- Commander, Engineer Command
  - Deputy Commander
  - Chief of Staff
  - Personnel Office
  - Doctrine, Studies and Lessons Learned Office
  - Operation, Training and Information Office
  - C4 Office
  - COBAR
  - Military chaplain
- Engineer Command, in Cecchignola (Lazio)
  - Engineer Brigade, in Cecchignola (Lazio)
    - 2nd Pontieri Engineer Regiment, in Piacenza (Emilia-Romagna)
    - 6th Pioneer Regiment, in Rome-Cecchignola (Lazio)
      - "Nemi" Battalion, in Rome-Cecchignola
      - "Trasimeno" Battalion, in Rome-Cecchignola
    - Ferrovieri Engineer Regiment, in Castel Maggiore (Emilia-Romagna)
    - Counter-IED Center of Excellence, in Cecchignola (Lazio)
    - Force Protection Engineers Support Center, in Cecchignola (Lazio)
    - Training Battalion, in Cecchignola (Lazio)
  - Infrastructure Command, in Cecchignola (Lazio)
    - 1st Infrastructure Department, in Turin (Piedmont)
      - 3rd Infrastructure Department, in Milan (Lombardy)
      - 4th Infrastructure Department, in Bolzano (South Tyrol)
    - Operational Infrastructure Engineer Unit, in Cecchignola (Lazio)
  - Historical and Cultural Institute of the Arm of Engineer

== See also ==
- Structure of the Italian Army
