= Bologne =

Bologne may refer to:

- Bologna, Italy, a city in Emilia-Romagna
- Bologne, Lombardy, a village near Redondesco in Italy
- Bologne, Haute-Marne, a commune in France
- Aimée Bologne-Lemaire (1904–1998), Belgian socialist
- Jean Bologne (1529–1608), Flemish sculptor based in Italy
- Joseph Bologne, different people

== See also ==
- Baloney (disambiguation)
- Bologna (disambiguation)
- Boulogne (disambiguation)
