= 6th Pioneer Regiment (Italy) =

Active Italian Army engineer unit

- 6° Reggimento Genio Pionieri
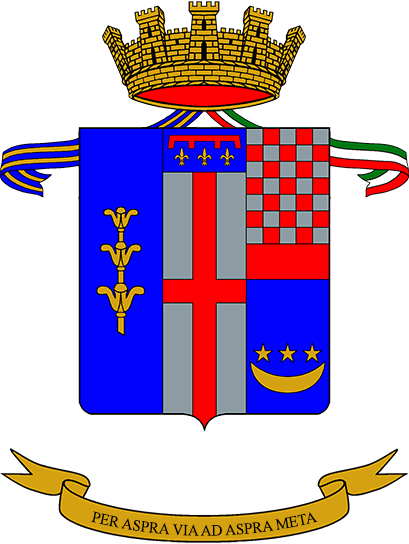
- Regimental coat of arms
- Active: 1 Nov. 1926 — 8 Sept. 1943; 1 Jan. 1976 — today
- Country: Italy
- Branch: Italian Army
- Role: Combat engineers
- Part of: Engineer Command
- Garrison/HQ: Cecchignola
- Motto(s): "Per aspra via ad aspra meta"
- Anniversaries: 24 June 1918 - Second Battle of the Piave River
- Decorations: 1× Gold Medal of Army Valor; 1× Bronze Medal of Civil Valor; 1× Silver Cross of Army Merit

Insignia
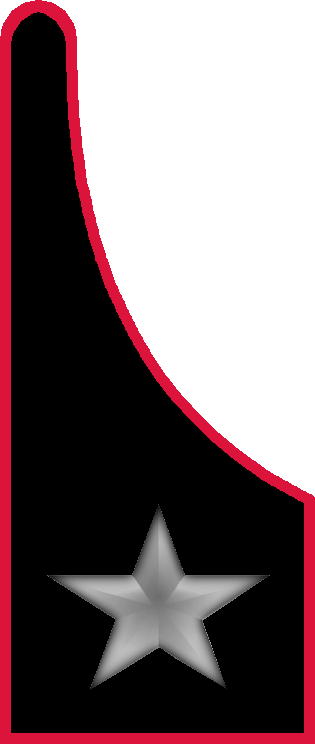
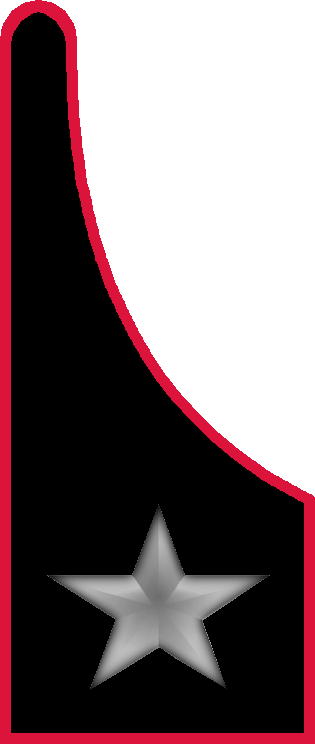
- Pioneers gorget patches

The 6th Pioneer Regiment (Italian: 6° Reggimento Genio Pionieri) is a military engineering regiment of the Italian Army based in the Cecchignola quarter of Rome. The regiment is assigned to the army's Engineer Command and the army's sole pioneer unit, whose focus, unlike the army's other engineer units, is on rear area construction tasks. In 1926, the Royal Italian Army formed the 6th Engineer Regiment in Bologna. During World War II the regiment's depot formed engineer battalions and smaller units, which deployed with divisions and corps to the fronts of the war. After the announcement of the Armistice of Cassibile on 8 September 1943 the regiment was disbanded by invading German forces.

In 1952, the Italian Army formed the Engineer Battalion "Granatieri di Sardegna" in Rome, which was assigned to the Infantry Division "Granatieri di Sardegna". In 1976, the battalion was renamed 6th Engineer Battalion "Trasimeno" and assigned the flag and traditions of the 6th Engineer Regiment. During the same year the Infantry Division "Granatieri di Sardegna" was disbanded and the battalion was transferred to the Central Military Region. In 1993, the battalion lost its autonomy and entered the reformed 6th Pioneer Regiment. In 1997, the regiment was transferred to the army's Engineer Grouping, which in 2010, was reorganized as Engineer Command. The regiment's anniversary falls, as for all engineer units, on 24 June 1918, the last day of the Second Battle of the Piave River.

== History ==
In October 1910, the Royal Italian Army formed the 6th Engineer Regiment (Ferrovieri). After the end of World War I the Royal Italian Army reorganized its forces and on 21 November 1919, the 6th Engineer Regiment (Ferrovieri) was renamed Ferrovieri Engineer Regiment. Since then the traditions of the 6th Engineer Regiment (Ferrovieri) are perpetuated by the Ferrovieri Engineer Regiment.

=== Interwar years ===
On 1 October 1922, the Royal Italian Army formed the 4th Army Corps Engineer Grouping in Bologna. The grouping received a Sappers Battalion and a Telegraphers Battalion, which had been formed on 1 April 1920 for the VI Army Corps. On the same date, 1 October 1922, the VI Army Corps was renumbered as IV Army Corps. The grouping also received a miners company from the disbanded Miners Engineer Regiment. After its formation the grouping consisted of a command, a sappers-miners battalion, a telegraphers battalion, which included two dovecotes located in Bologna and Treviso, a photo-electricians company, and a depot.

In 1926, the IV Army Corps was renumbered as VI Army Corps and consequently, on 1 November 1926, the grouping was renamed 6th Engineer Regiment. During the same year the dovecote in Treviso was transferred to the 4th Engineer Regiment and replaced by a dovecote in Ancona. In February 1928, the regiment ceded a sappers-miners company and a telegraphers company to help form the 11th Engineer Regiment. On 28 October 1932, the regiment received the II Radio-Telegraphers Battalion of the disbanded 1st Radio-Telegraphers Regiment.

At the end of 1936 the regiment consisted of a command, an engineer battalion, a telegraphers battalion, a radio-telegraphers battalion, two dovecotes, and a depot. In January 1937, the telegraphers and radio-telegraphers battalions were renamed connections battalions.

=== World War II ===
During World War II the regiment's depot in Bologna mobilized the following units:

- Command of the 3rd Engineer Grouping
- III Telegraphers Battalion
- III Marconisti Battalion
- IX Mixed Engineer Battalion (for the Alpine Army Corps)
- XI Engineer Battalion
- XVII Mixed Engineer Battalion (for the 17th Infantry Division "Pavia")
- XXIV Engineer Battalion
- CXVI Mixed Engineer Battalion (for the 16th Infantry Division "Pistoia")
- CLIII Mixed Engineer Battalion (for the 153rd Infantry Division "Macerata")
- CLV Mixed Engineer Battalion (for the 155th Infantry Division "Emilia")
- CCII Mixed Engineer Battalion (for the 2nd CC.NN. Division "28 Ottobre")
- 16th, 19th, and 30th mobile dovecotes
- and many smaller units

On 11 June 1940, the 3rd Engineer Grouping was formed. In April 1941, the grouping fought in the invasion of Yugoslavia. After the surrender of Yugoslavia, the grouping was assigned to the 2nd Army and moved to Sušak on occupation duty. The XVII Mixed Engineer Battalion, CXVI Mixed Engineer Battalion, and CCII Mixed Engineer Battalion fought in the Western Desert campaign, while the IX Mixed Engineer Battalion fought on the Eastern Front. In the evening of 8 September 1943, the Armistice of Cassibile, which ended hostilities between the Kingdom of Italy and the Anglo-American Allies, was announced by General Dwight D. Eisenhower on Radio Algiers and by Marshal Pietro Badoglio on Italian radio. Germany reacted by invading Italy and the 3rd Engineer Grouping and 6th Engineer Regiment were disbanded soon thereafter by German forces. The 54th Engineer Company, which had been formed in 1940 by the 6th Engineer Regiment for the 21st Infantry Division "Granatieri di Sardegna", was based in Rome when the Armistice of Cassibile was announced. The company fought, together with the grenadiers of the 21st Infantry Division "Granatieri di Sardegna" and the lancers of the Regiment "Lancieri di Montebello", against the Germans, who tried to occupy Rome. In the evening of 10 September 1943, the Italian units defending Rome surrendered to the Germans.

=== Cold War ===
On 1 July 1949, the Italian Army formed an Engineer Company in Rome by reorganizing the existing 8th Territorial Engineer Company. The company was assigned to the Infantry Division "Granatieri di Sardegna" and consequently, on 1 March 1950, the company was renamed Engineer Company "Granatieri di Sardegna". In 1951, the company moved from Rome to Civitavecchia. On 1 May 1952, the company joined the newly formed Engineer Battalion "Granatieri di Sardegna". The battalion consisted of a command, a command platoon, three engineer companies, and a field park company. In 1955, the battalion moved from Civitavecchia to Rome.

During the 1975 army reform the army disbanded the regimental level and newly independent battalions were granted for the first time their own flags. During the reform engineer battalions were named for a lake, if they supported an corps-level command, or a river, if they supported a division or brigade. On 1 August 1975, the Engineer Battalion "Centauro" transferred its 4th Engineer Company in Civitavecchia to the Engineer Battalion "Granatieri di Sardegna". On 30 September 1975, the 1st Engineer Company of the Engineer Battalion "Granatieri di Sardegna" moved to Sora, where the next day, the company was assigned to the newly formed Motorized Brigade "Acqui". On 1 January 1976, the Engineer Battalion "Granatieri di Sardegna" was renamed 6th Engineer Battalion "Trasimeno". The battalion was named for Lake Trasimeno, which is located in Umbria. After the reform the 6th Engineer Battalion "Trasimeno" consisted of a command, a command and park company, three engineer companies, and the Engineer Company "Granatieri di Sardegna". On 31 October 1976, the Infantry Division "Granatieri di Sardegna" was disbanded, and the next day, on 1 November 1976, the Mechanized Brigade "Granatieri di Sardegna" was formed and received the units of the disbanded division. On the same day, 1 November 1976, the 6th Engineer Battalion "Trasimeno" was assigned to the Central Military Region, and the Engineer Company "Granatieri di Sardegna" left the battalion and was assigned to the Mechanized Brigade "Granatieri di Sardegna". After these changes the 6th Engineer Battalion "Trasimeno" fielded 756 men (38 officers, 98 non-commissioned officers, and 620 soldiers).

On 12 November 1976, the President of the Italian Republic Giovanni Leone assigned with decree 846 the flag and traditions of the 6th Engineer Regiment to the battalion. The battalion also received the traditions of all engineer units, which had served with the "Granatieri di Sardegna" division and the traditions of the 54th Engineer Company.

In 1988, the battalion's Command and Park Company split into the Command and Services Company and the Special Equipment Company. Afterwards the battalion consisted of the following units:

- 6th Engineer Battalion "Trasimeno", in Rome
  - Command and Services Company
  - 1st Engineer Company
  - 2nd Engineer Company
  - 3rd Engineer Company
  - Special Equipment Company

=== Recent times ===
On 3 September 1993, the 6th Engineer Battalion "Trasimeno" lost its autonomy and the next day the battalion entered the reformed 6th Pioneer Regiment. On the same day, the flag and traditions of the 6th Engineer Regiment were transferred from the battalion to the 6th Pioneer Regiment. On 1 December 1997, the regiment was transferred from the Central Military Region to the army's Engineer Grouping. After the 1997 Umbria and Marche earthquake the regiment was deployed to the affected areas, where it remained until May 1998. For its service the regiment was awarded a Bronze Medal of Civil Valor, which was affixed to the regiment's flag and is depicted on the regiment's coat of arms.

On 24 January 2005, the regiment formed the Pioneer Battalion "Nemi". The new battalion was named for the volcanic crater Lake Nemi near Rome.

After the August 2016 earthquake in Central Italy the regiment's companies deployed to the area to assist in the recovery efforts and to provide engineering services to the affected communities. For its service after the earthquake the regiment was awarded a Gold Medal of Army Valor, which was affixed to the regiment's flag and is depicted on the regiment's coat of arms.

== Organization ==
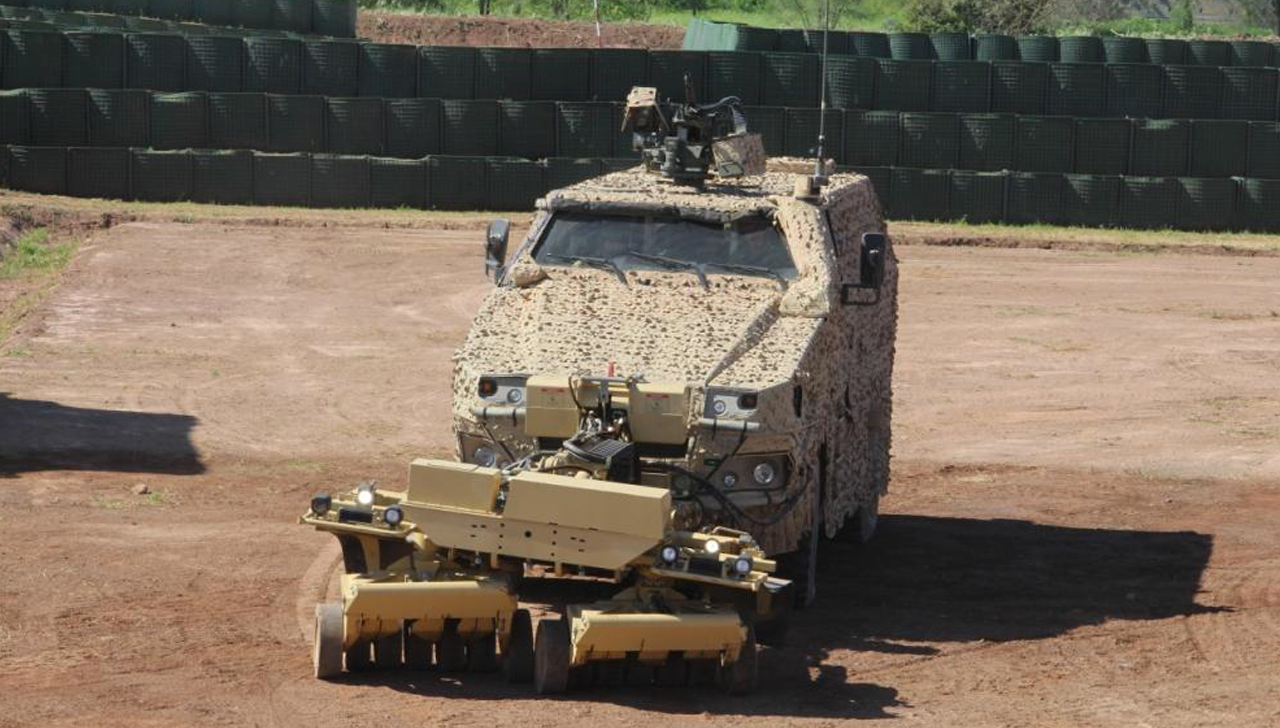
A VTMM "Orso" Route Clearing vehicle of the Italian engineer corps

As of 2024 the 6th Pioneer Regiment is organized as follows:

- 6th Pioneer Regiment, in Cecchignola
  - Command and Logistic Support Company
  - Pioneer Battalion "Trasimeno"
    - Pioneer Company "Trasimeno"
    - Road Construction and Earthworks Company "Trasimeno"
    - Buildings and Installations Construction Company "Trasimeno"
  - Pioneer Battalion "Nemi"
    - Pioneer Company "Nemi"
    - Road Construction and Earthworks Company "Nemi"
    - Buildings and Installations Construction Company "Nemi"
