= Bolognese =

Bolognese may refer to:

- Someone or something from the city of Bologna
- Bolognese sauce
- Bolognese dog
- Bolognese dialect, a dialect of Emiliano-Romagnolo, a Romance language
- Bolognese School (painting)
- Bolognese Swordsmanship
- Sant'Agata Bolognese
- Bolognese bell ringing art
- Bolognese (film), a 1975 Italian comedy
- "Bolognese" (The Bear), a 2023 episode of The Bear TV series

== People with the surname ==
- Franco Bolognese (14th century), Italian painter

== See also ==
- Bologna (disambiguation)
- Bolognesi (disambiguation)
