= San Martino di Castagnolo Minore, Bentivoglio =

Church in Bologna province, Italy

Coordinates: 44°36′26.5″N 11°22′36.8″E

San Martino di Castagnolo Minore or of Castaniolo Minore is a Roman Catholic parish church located in the town of Bentivolgio in the Province of Bologna, Italy.

A large chestnut tree near the site gave name to two parish churches, the one on higher ground next to Castel Maggiore, and this one as Minore. The church is dedicated to the Bishop Martin of Tours. A church on the site might have been present by the 10th century, and is documented by the late 12th century, through a bull of Pope Urban III in 1187. The present church was built in the 1500s.

In the 1830s, rebuilding restored the belltower and facade, and the interior was redecorated with nave frescoes by Gaetano Caponeri; and chapel frescoes by Luigi Biondi, Cammillo Mattioli, and Antonio Muzzi.
