= Oderisi da Gubbio =

Italian painter

Oderisi da Gubbio (Gubbio, circa 1240 - Rome, 1299) was an Italian painter and manuscript illuminator of the 13th century. Few details of his life are known. Documents to his activities in Bologna span from 1262 to 1271. In 1292, he was called to Rome by Pope Boniface VIII to illuminate manuscripts in the papal library.

Attributed to Oderisi are:

- Illuminated missals from the Canonica della Basilica di San Pietro of Rome;
- Digestum infortiatum of Justinian, National Library of Turin;
- Conradin Bible, Walters Art Gallery, Baltimore, Maryland, USA;
- Psalter 346, University Library of Bologna;
- A Bible, Biblioteca Apostolica Vaticana.

== Oderisi in Dante's Divine Comedy ==
Oderisi appears in Canto XI of Dante Alighieri's Purgatorio on the terrace of pride. There, souls repent for their prideful past by carrying heavy stones on their backs that force them to hunch over with their faces to the ground. Oderisi is described to represent the pride of art and fame. He recognizes Dante from beneath his burden and calls out to the poet who then remembers his face. Dante responds to Oderisi and refers to him as "the honor of Gubbio and of that art which they in Paris call illumination." Oderisi replies as an example of humility, brushing off Dante's praise stating that his pupil, Franco Bolognese, is more worthy of it. He then engages with Dante emphasizing the ills brought about by earthly vanity and the reality of fleeting earthly fame:

Oh, vain glory of all human power!
How soon the green from the summit fades,
If not rotted by the age's grossness!
Once the painter Cimabue thought
He held the field; now Giotto is all the rage,
Obscuring the fame of the former.
Also true, no sooner one man takes from another
The glory of our tongue, thereupon another
Is born, who will chase them both from that nest.
Their mundane rumors are but a gust
of wind, shifting from here to there,
changing names, because they change sides.
Even if you could age a thousand years
After the crib and breast; it would be an inch
To eternity, a blink of an eyelid compared
To the slowest of the turning spheres.
Translation from Dante, Purgatorio, XI, 79-123
