= Conradin Bible =

Illuminated manuscript produced in southern Italy

An illustrated fragment of the Conrad Bible now in the Musée des Beaux-Arts at the Château de Blois.

The Conradin Bible is an illuminated manuscript likely produced in central or southern Italy around 1265. It is usually associated with its namesake, Conradin, king of Sicily (1254–68). It was originally a large codex illustrated with 57 miniatures and numerous historiated and illuminated initials in a High Romanesque style with Byzantine influences. It was cut up and dispersed for centuries, but most of it—164 folios and some fragments—has been reassembled and is now MS W. 152 in the collection of the Walters Art Gallery in Baltimore.

In 1966, Roberto Longhi proposed that the illustrator of the Conradin Bible was Oderisi da Gubbio.

The manuscript is fully digitised and available online.
