= Baloney (disambiguation) =

Baloney is another name for bologna sausage.

Baloney may also refer to:

- Baloney (Animaniacs), a character from Animaniacs
- Baloney (album), an EP by LA Symphony
- Baloney (Henry P.), a children's picture book by Jon Scieszka and Lane Smith
- Billy Baloney, a character on the American comedy children's television series Pee-wee's Playhouse
- American slang term for something that does not make sense or fit the evidence; see nonsense

== See also ==
- Abalone
- Bologna (disambiguation)
- Bologne (disambiguation)
