= Boulogne (surname) =

Boulogne is a French surname. Notable people with the surname include:

- Anthony Boulogne (born 1993), French politician
- Christian Aaron Boulogne (1962–2023), French photographer and actor
- Étienne-Antoine Boulogne (1747–1825), French archbishop
- Geoffroy de Boulogne (died 1095), French bishop
- Georges Boulogne (1917–1999), French football player
- Guillaume Duchenne de Boulogne (1806–1875), French neurologist
- Isabelle Boulogne (born 1971), French sprint canoeist
- Chevalier de Saint-Georges also known as Joseph Boulogne, French classical composer, swordsman and equestrian
- Paul de Boulogne (1863–1938), French sailor
- Valentin de Boulogne (1591–1632), French painter
