= Boullogne =

Boullogne is a French surname. Notable people with the surname include:

- Bon Boullogne (died 1717), French painter
- Geneviève Boullogne (1645–1708), French painter
- Louis Boullogne (1609–1674), French painter
- Louis de Boullogne (1654–1733), French painter
- Madeleine Boullogne (1646–1710), French painter

== See also ==
- Boulogne (disambiguation)
