= Villa Smeraldi, Bentivoglio =

Coordinates: 44.6034°N 11.4171°E

Villa Smeraldi is a rural palace, now museum, along the Canale Navile near the town of Bentivoglio in the Province of Bologna, in the region of Emilia-Romagna of Italy. The villa is the host of the Museum of Peasant Farming Culture (in Italian: Museo della civiltà contadina), which documents the buildings, tools, routines, and daily lives of those involved in rural agriculture from landowner to peasant.

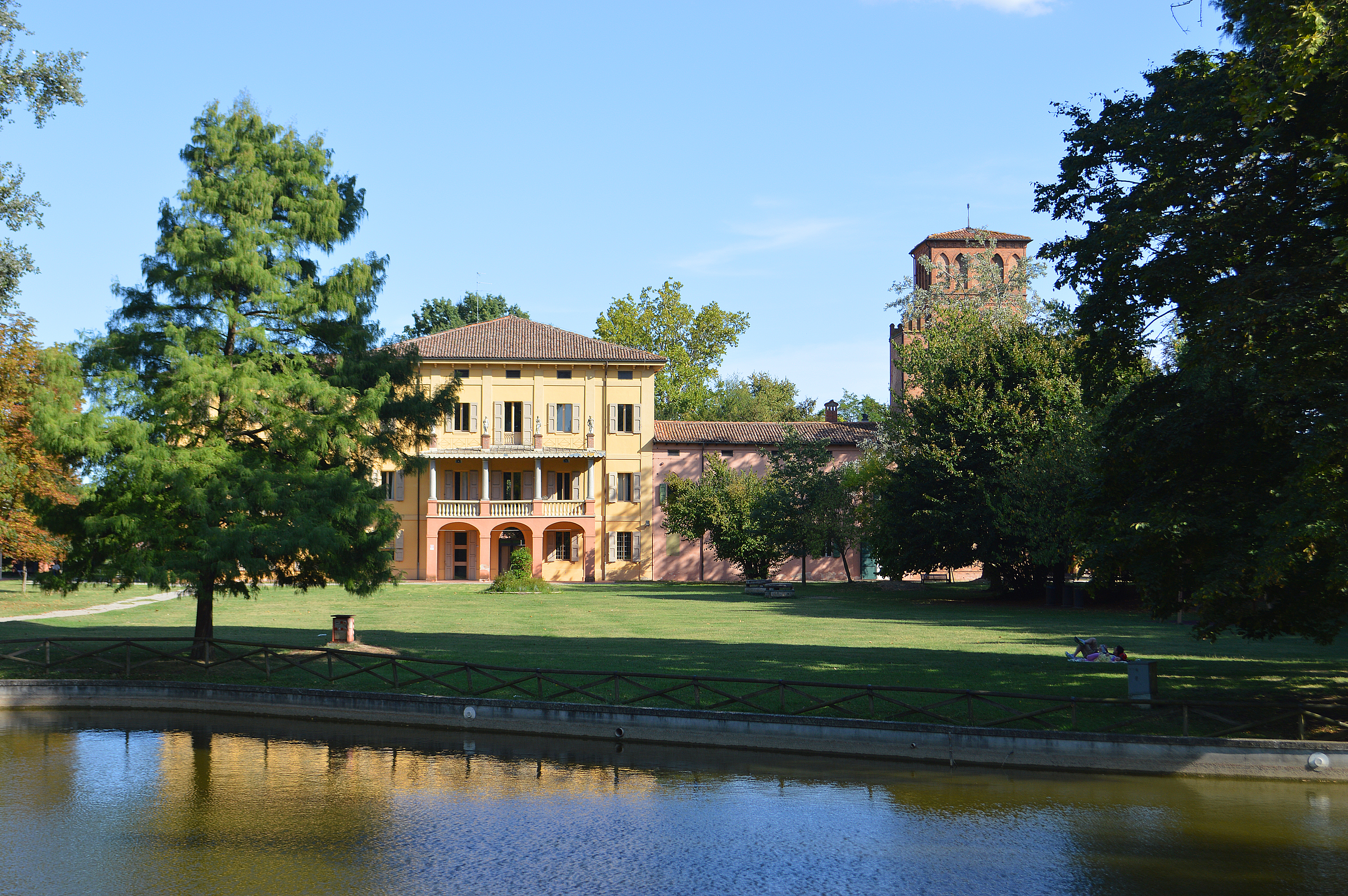
Villa from across Canal

== History ==
Built on the foundations of a series of buildings constructed in the 1700 and 1800s, the Villa Smeraldi complex is known by the surname of its most recent owners. The various structures of the property reveal the duality of its origins.

The villa, once known as a casino or rural palazzo, dates back to 1783, when it belonged to the Counts of Zambeccari. Over the following century, the buildings were expanded, a Neo-Gothic-style tower was added and some free-style gardens were made to surround the villa. In the late second half of the 19th century by Count Gaetano Zucchini and his son Antonio expanded the property. From 1922 to 1942, it was owned by Rigoberto Smeraldi, who engaged in agriculture and raised thoroughbred horses. The property was inherited by Antonio Roversi. During the Second World War the villa was mainly occupied by German army. The province of Bologna acquired the site in 1970 to create the museum.

The "Salone delle Feste" of the piano nobile of the villa was frescoed in the 19th century.

The garden of Villa Smeraldi photographed by Paolo Monti in 1973

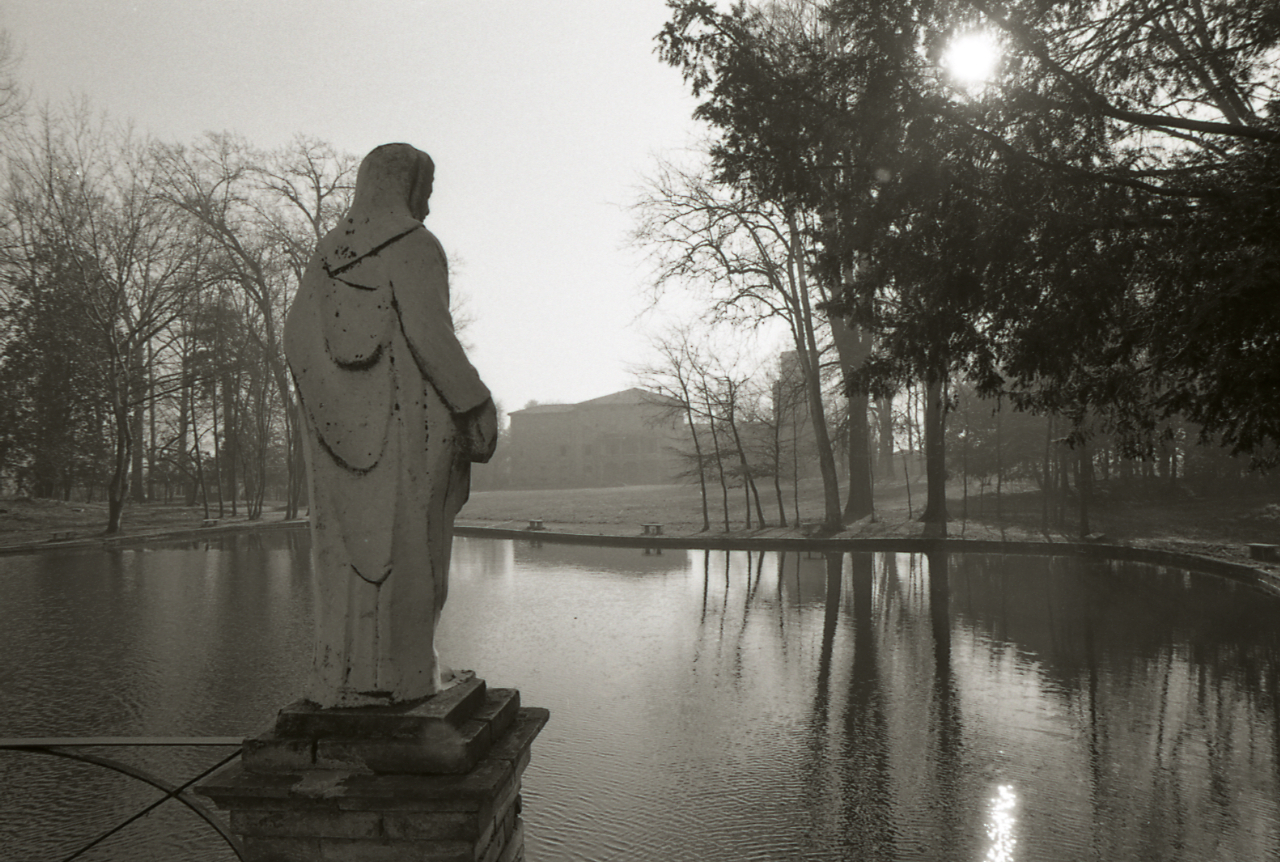

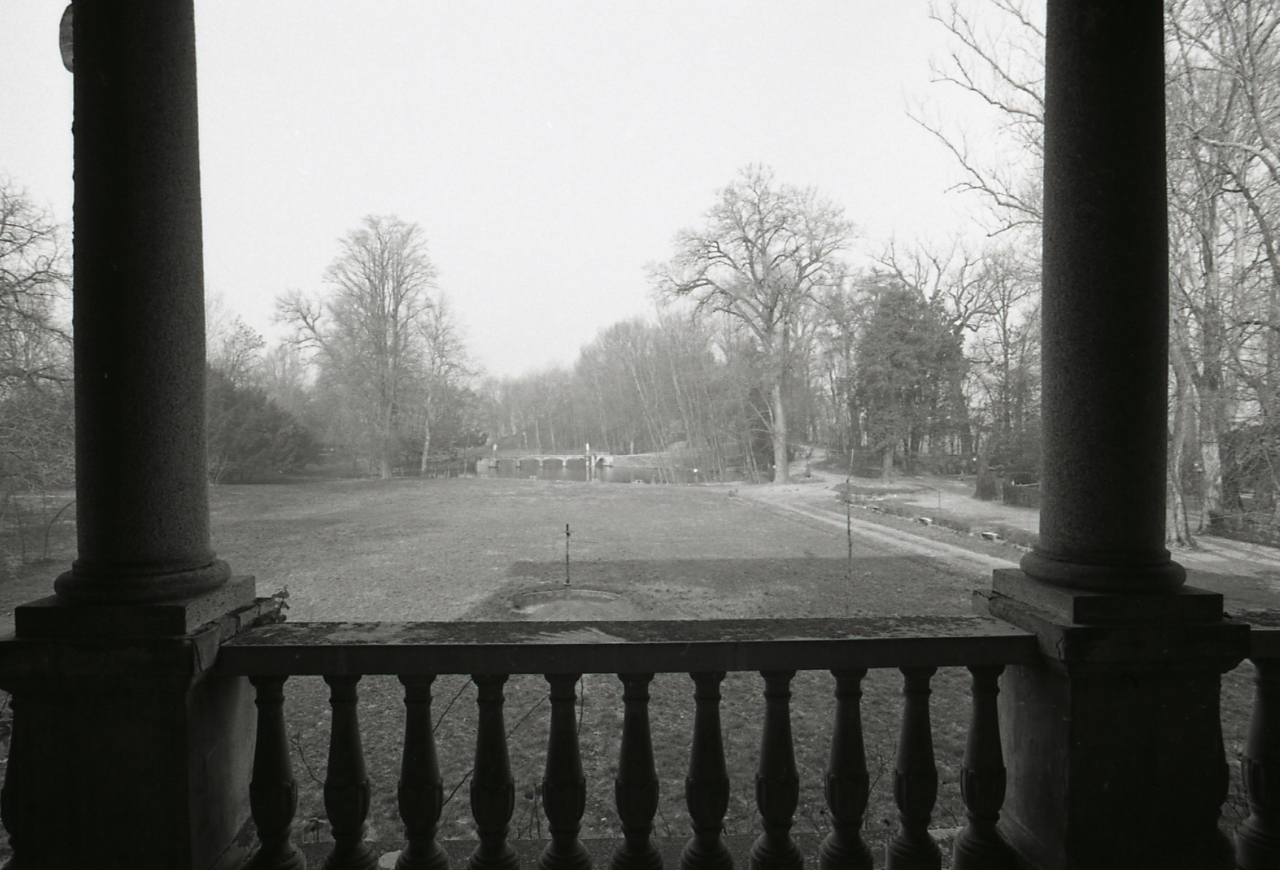
