= Ferrovieri Engineer Regiment =

Active Italian Army railroad engineer unit

- Reggimento Genio Ferrovieri
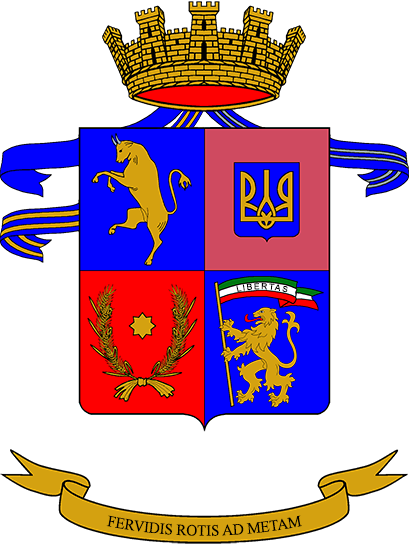
- Regimental coat of arms
- Active: Oct. 1910 — 8 Sept. 1943; 1 Oct. 1957 — today
- Country: Italy
- Branch: Italian Army
- Role: Railway engineers
- Part of: Engineer Command
- Garrison/HQ: Castel Maggiore
- Motto: "Fervidis rotis ad metam"
- Anniversaries: 24 June 1918 - Second Battle of the Piave River
- Decorations: 1× Bronze Medal of Military Valor; 1× War Cross of Military Valor; 1× Silver Medal of Army Valor; 1× Gold Cross of Army Merit; 1× Bronze Cross of Army Merit

Insignia
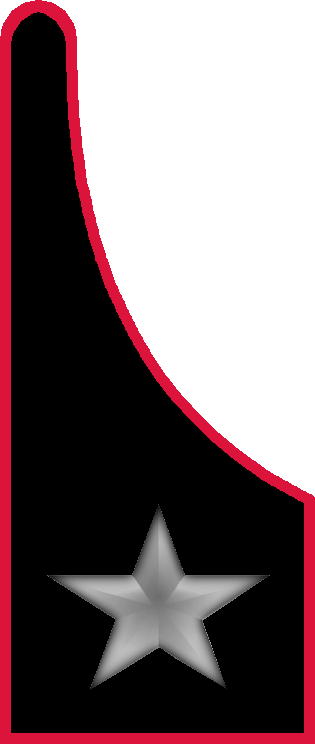
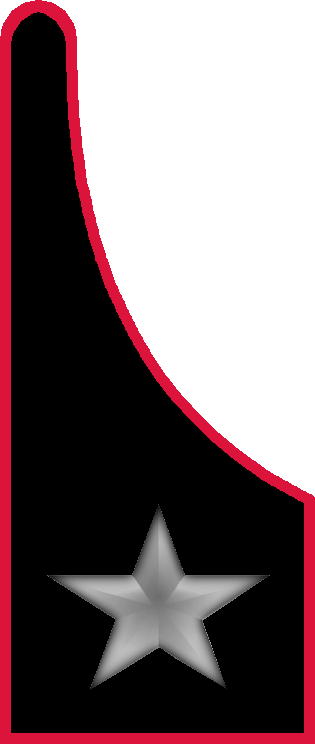
- Ferrovieri gorget patches

The Ferrovieri Engineer Regiment (Italian: Reggimento Genio Ferrovieri) is a military engineering regiment of the Italian Army based in Castel Maggiore in the Emilia Romagna. The regiment is assigned to the army's Engineer Command and is the Italian Army's only unit capable of constructing and operating railways. The term "Ferrovieri" comes from the Italian word for railway (Italian: Ferrovia) and is used to denote units of the engineer arm tasked with the construction, restoration, maintenance, and operation of railways. Enlisted personnel in such units is addressed by the singular form: "Ferroviere".

In 1873, the Royal Italian Army formed the first Italian Ferrovieri companies, which were tasked with the construction and repair of railways. In 1891, the first railway operations companies were formed. In 1910, the Ferrovieri units were used to form the 6th Engineer Regiment (Ferrovieri). During World War I the regiment's depots formed numerous units, which built and operated railways along the Italian front. In 1919, the regiment was renamed Ferrovieri Engineer Regiment. During World War II the regiment formed ten Ferrovieri battalions and three Pontieri battalions, as well as three railway operations groups. One of the Ferrovieri battalions served in the Western Desert campaign and Tunisian campaign, while two Ferrovieri battalions served with the Italian Army in Russia during the Italian campaign on the Eastern Front. After the announcement of the Armistice of Cassibile on 8 September 1943, the regiment was disbanded by invading German forces, while the Ferrovieri units in Southern Italy joined the Italian Co-Belligerent Army. These units repaired and operated railway lines, which supported the advance of the allied 15th Army Group during the Italian campaign. In 1957, the regiment was reformed and included a Ferrovieri battalion and an operations battalion. In 2017, the two battalions merged into a single unit. The regiment's anniversary falls, as for all engineer units, on 24 June 1918, the last day of the Second Battle of the Piave River.

== History ==
=== Formation ===
In 1859, during the Second Italian War of Independence, the first use of railways for military purposes occurred in Italy, when personnel of the 1st Engineer Regiment was operated railways to transport French and Sardinian troops. On 30 September 1873, the Italian government ordered that the Royal Sardinian Army's Sappers Corps should be split into two regiments and each of the two new regiments should include two Ferrovieri companies. On 1 January 1874, the Sappers Corps was split into the 1st Engineer Regiment and 2nd Engineer Regiment. The former regiment included one Ferrovieri Company, while the latter regiment included two Ferrovieri companies. The three companies were based in Turin and grouped together in the Ferrovieri Brigade, which was tasked with training the personnel of the two regiment's Ferrovieri companies. On 1 November 1877, the second Ferrovieri Company for the 1st Engineer Regiment was formed in Turin. On 1 November 1883, the four Ferrovieri companies were assigned to the Ferrovieri Brigade, which on the same date joined the newly formed 3rd Engineer Regiment. On 23 June 1887, the 3rd Engineer Regiment transferred the Ferrovieri Brigade to the 4th Engineer Regiment.

In 1891, the Ferrovieri Brigade took over the operation of the Torino-Torre Pellice/Barge railway, which resulted in a reorganization of the brigade: the 1st and 3rd companies were reorganized as operations companies, while the 2nd and 4th companies were organized as construction companies. On 1 July 1895, the Ferrovieri Brigade became an autonomous unit and added the 5th and 6th construction companies. Afterwards the brigade's six companies were group into two Ferrovieri groups. In 1903, the I Ferrovieri Group, which consisted of the 1st Operations Company and 2nd Construction Company, moved to Rome. In September 1906, the brigade formed a Motorists Section in Turin. Between September 1907 and September 1910 the I Ferrovieri Group operated the Rome–Frascati railway.

In October 1910, the Ferrovieri Brigade was renamed 6th Engineer Regiment (Ferrovieri). The new regiment consisted of a staff, a Ferrovieri battalion with four companies in Turin, a Ferrovieri battalion with two companies in Rome, a motorists battalion with two companies in Turin, a railway operations section in Turin, which operated the Turin-Pinerolo railway, a depot in Turin, and a branch depot in Rome. The regiment's oldest and thus senior company, the 1st Operations Company, had been active as 6th Sappers Company during the Second Italian War of Independence and the following Sardinian campaign in central and southern Italy. On 20 October 1860, during the latter campaign, the 6th Sappers Company distinguished itself in Battle of Macerone Pass and was awarded a Bronze Medal of Military Valor, which, upon the regiment's formation, was affixed to the regiment's flag.

In 1912, the regiment's two motorists companies became responsible to train the personnel of the photo-electrical service, which operated searchlights. In December 1913, the branch depot in Rome formed the Special Photo-Electrical Section, which trained personnel of the army's artillery arm in the use of searchlights. In 1914, the Special Photo-Electrical Section was transferred to the Artillery Arm's newly formed Artillery Specialists Group.

=== World War I ===
In May 1915, shortly before Italy's entry into World War I, the regiment fielded twelve Ferrovieri companies, which were dispersed in North-Eastern Italy and tasked with transporting men and materiel to the Italian front, as well as with maintaining and extending the railway network near the front. On 24 May 1915, the twelve Ferrovieri companies were stationed in the following locations:

- 1st Ferrovieri Company, in Perarolo di Cadore — detachments in Calalzo di Cadore, Pieve di Cadore, and Belluno
- 2nd Ferrovieri Company, in Chiusaforte — detachments in Stazione Carnia, Dogna, and Gemona del Friuli
- 3rd Ferrovieri Company, in Udine — detachments in Cividale del Friuli and Codroipo
- 4th Ferrovieri Company, in Verona — detachment in Ala
- 5th Ferrovieri Company, in Cervignano del Friuli
- 6th Ferrovieri Company, in Treviso — detachments in Spilimbergo and Casarsa della Delizia
- 7th Ferrovieri Company, in Grigno
- 8th Ferrovieri Company, in Pieria
- 9th Ferrovieri Company, in Cormons
- 10th Ferrovieri Company, in Schio
- 11th Ferrovieri Company, in Vicenza — detachment in Schio
- 12th Ferrovieri Company, in Latisana — detachments in San Vito al Tagliamento and Pordenone

During the war the regiment's depot and branch depot continued to form battalions and companies, which operated in all sectors of the front. In total the two depots formed an additional three Ferrovieri battalion commands and 16 Ferrovieri companies, nine decauville operations companies, seven photo-electricians battalions and 36 photo-electricians companies. The two depots also formed 26 territorial photo-electricians sections which operated more than 1,200 searchlight stations. During the war Ferrovieri units built 91 mi (147 km) of railway, 373 mi (600 km) of decauville trench railways, and repaired 144 bridges.

On 21 November 1919, the 6th Engineer Regiment (Ferrovieri) was renamed Ferrovieri Engineer Regiment. At the time the regiment consisted of command, the I Ferrovieri Battalion with four companies in Turin, the II Ferrovieri Battalion with two companies in Treviso, a railway operations section in Turin, a depot in Turin, and a branch depot in Treviso. The Railway Operations Section operated the Chivasso–Ivrea–Aosta railway since 1915. In April 1920, the photo-electricians units were assigned to newly formed army corps telegraphers battalions.

In November 1921, the 2nd Railway Operations Section was formed in Meran, which operated the Bolzano-Meran-Mals railway. In 1923, the two sections were united in the Operations Group. On 11 March 1926, the Ferrovieri Engineer Regiment was renamed Ferrovieri Regiment. On 25 April 1932, the 2nd Railway Operations Section was disbanded and the regiment then only operated the Chivasso–Ivrea–Aosta railway.

In 1935, the regiment formed the following units in preparation for the Second Italo-Ethiopian War:

- 30th and 31st Ferrovieri companies
- one railway operations section
- one special Ferrovieri section
- one mechanics/electricians company

On 1 October 1938, the regiment received a Dismountable Metal Bridges Company from the 2nd Pontieri Regiment.

=== World War II ===
During World War II the regiment's depot in Turin mobilized the following units:

- Command of the 1st Ferrovieri Regiment
- I, II, III, IV, V, VI, VII, VIII, IX, X, and XIII Ferrovieri battalions
- IX, XI, and XII dismountable metal bridges battalions
- I, II, and III railway operations groups (each with five sections)
- a bath train
- and numerous smaller Ferrovieri construction and operating units

On 9 July 1943, the day before allied forces landed on Sicily, the Italian Army's General Staff ordered that all Ferrovieri units, with the exception of those in Italian occupied France, Italian occupied Greece, Corsica and Sardinia, would be assigned on 15 July 1943 to four Ferrovieri groupings:

- 1st Ferrovieri Grouping: I, VII, and VIII Ferrovieri battalions
- 2nd Ferrovieri Grouping: III, VI, and XIII Ferrovieri battalions, and III Railway Operations Group
- 3rd Ferrovieri Grouping: IV and X Ferrovieri battalions, and II Railway Operations Group
- 4th Ferrovieri Grouping: V and IX Ferrovieri battalions, and I Railway Operations Group

During the war, the VII Ferrovieri Battalion served in the Western Desert campaign and Tunisian campaign. The IX and X Ferrovieri battalions served on the Eastern Front, where the X Ferrovieri Battalion fought in the Battle of Arbuzovka as infantry, earning the battalion a War Cross of Military Valor, which was affixed to the regiment's flag and is depicted on the regiment's coat of arms. In 1941, the IV Ferrovieri Battalion's 9th Ferrovieri Company built a combined road and rail bridge over the Corinth Canal, using an Austrian Roth-Waagner-Brückengerät. The same battalion repaired the bridge over the Gorgopotamos river after the British-Greek Operation Harling had successfully destroyed the bridge on 25 November 1942. Another bridge repaired by the regiment's troops was the Stampetta Bridge in Slovenia. The III and VI Ferrovieri battalions served during the campaign in Sicily.

In the evening of 8 September 1943, the Armistice of Cassibile, which ended hostilities between the Kingdom of Italy and the Anglo-American Allies, was announced by General Dwight D. Eisenhower on Radio Algiers and by Marshal Pietro Badoglio on Italian radio. Germany reacted by invading Italy and the regiment and most of its units were disbanded soon thereafter by German forces. However, the regiment's units in southern Italy were unaffected by the German invasion of Italy and thus able to join the Italian Co-Belligerent Army, which assigned them to the Ferrovieri Grouping. The grouping repaired and operated railway lines, which transported supplies and materiel for the allied 15th Army Group fighting its way up the Italian peninsula during the Italian campaign. Initially the Ferrovieri Grouping consisted of the I and XIII Ferrovieri battalions, which were later joined by the II, III, and VI Ferrovieri battalions. The Ferrovieri repaired, and at times also operated, the Naples-Reggio Calabria, Naples-Caserta, Naples-Rome, Rome-Pisa, Rome-Florence, Bari-Ancona-Bologna, and Bologna-Verona railways. The grouping was disbanded on 1 November 1945, and only two of its dismountable metal bridges companies remained active. After the war, the two companies built 23 bridges and dismantled 13, which had been partially destroyed during the war. In 1947, the two companies were used to form a Ferrovieri Battalion in Castel Maggiore.

=== Cold War ===
In 1949, the a Railway Operations Section was reformed in Turin, which once again took over operation of the Chivasso–Ivrea–Aosta railway. The section was quickly expanded to Railway Operations Company. On 15 December 1949, the Ferrovieri Battalion in Castel Maggiore and the Railway Operations Company in Turin were assigned to the reformed 2nd Pontieri Engineer Regiment. On 1 January 1954, the Ferrovieri Battalion became an autonomous unit, which on 1 October 1957, was used to reform the Ferrovieri Engineer Regiment. On the same day, the 2nd Pontieri Engineer Regiment transferred the II Pontieri Battalion in Legnano and the Railway Operations Company in Turin to the Ferrovieri Engineer Regiment. The reformed regiment was assigned to the Tuscan-Emilian Military Region and consisted at the time of a command, a command company, the I Ferrovieri Battalion, the II Pontieri Battalion, the Railway Operations Company, and the 3rd Dismountable Metal Bridges Company. On 1 January 1962, the regiment received the VI Army Corps Engineer Battalion from the VI Army Corps. In 1963, the 3rd Dismountable Metal Bridges Company was disbanded. On 1 February 1964, the II Pontieri Battalion was returned to the 2nd Pontieri Engineer Regiment. On 1 July 1965, the Railway Operations Company was expanded to Railway Operations Battalion.

As part of the 1975 Italian Army reform the VI Army Corps Engineer Battalion was disbanded on 31 October 1975. During the reform the regiment was transferred from the Tuscan-Emilian Military Region to the Engineering Inspectorate. After the reform the regiment's organization was as follows:

- Ferrovieri Engineer Regiment, in Castel Maggiore
  - Command and Services Platoon, in Castel Maggiore
  - I Ferrovieri Battalion (Dismountable Metal Bridges), in Castel Maggiore
  - II Ferrovieri Battalion (Operations), in Turin

On 8 October 1977, flood waters of the Toce river swept the railway bridge of the Domodossola–Milan railway between Fondotoce and Feriolo away and the Ferrovieri Engineer Regiment was called to rebuild the 120 m (131 yd) bridge. On 27 May 1978, the new bridge was opened and traffic between Milan and the Simplon Railway could resume. For the reconstruction of the bridge the regiment was awarded a Bronze Cross of Army Merit, which was affixed to the regiment's flag.

=== Recent times ===
On 16 July 1992, the regiment's Command and Services Platoon was expanded to Command and Services Company. In 1996, after the Bosnian War, the regiment deployed to Bosnia-Herzegovina, where it repaired the 186 mi (300 km) long Novi Grad–Bosanska Otoka–Martin Brod–Strmica railway in Northern Bosnia, which had been heavily damaged during the war. The regiment returned to Italy in 1998. For its service in Bosnia-Herzegovina the regiment was awarded a Silver Medal of Army Valor, which was affixed to the regiment's flag and added to the regiment's coat of arms. On 1 December 1997 the regiment was assigned to the army's Engineer Grouping, which on 10 September 2010, was reorganized as Engineer Command.

In July 1999, after the Kosovo War, the regiment deployed to Kosovo, where it operated the Skopje–Kosovo Polje–Pristina railway, and repaired/operated the Kosovo Polje–Peć and Klina–Prizren railways. The regiment returned to Italy in December 1999. For its service in Kosovo the regiment was awarded a Gold Cross of Army Merit, which was affixed to the regiment's flag.

On 27 September 2001, the regiment ceded the operation of the Chivasso–Ivrea–Aosta railway to the Ferrovie dello Stato. On 1 February 2002, the regiment formed the Operations Battalion in Ozzano Emilia, which consisted of the personnel and materiel of the 2nd Ferrovieri Battalion (Operations) in Turin, before the latter disbanded on 31 August of the same year and reformed as 32nd Engineer Battalion the next day. On 31 October 2017, the regiment disbanded its Operations Battalion and merged the battalion's functions and personnel into the Ferrovieri Battalion.

== Organization ==
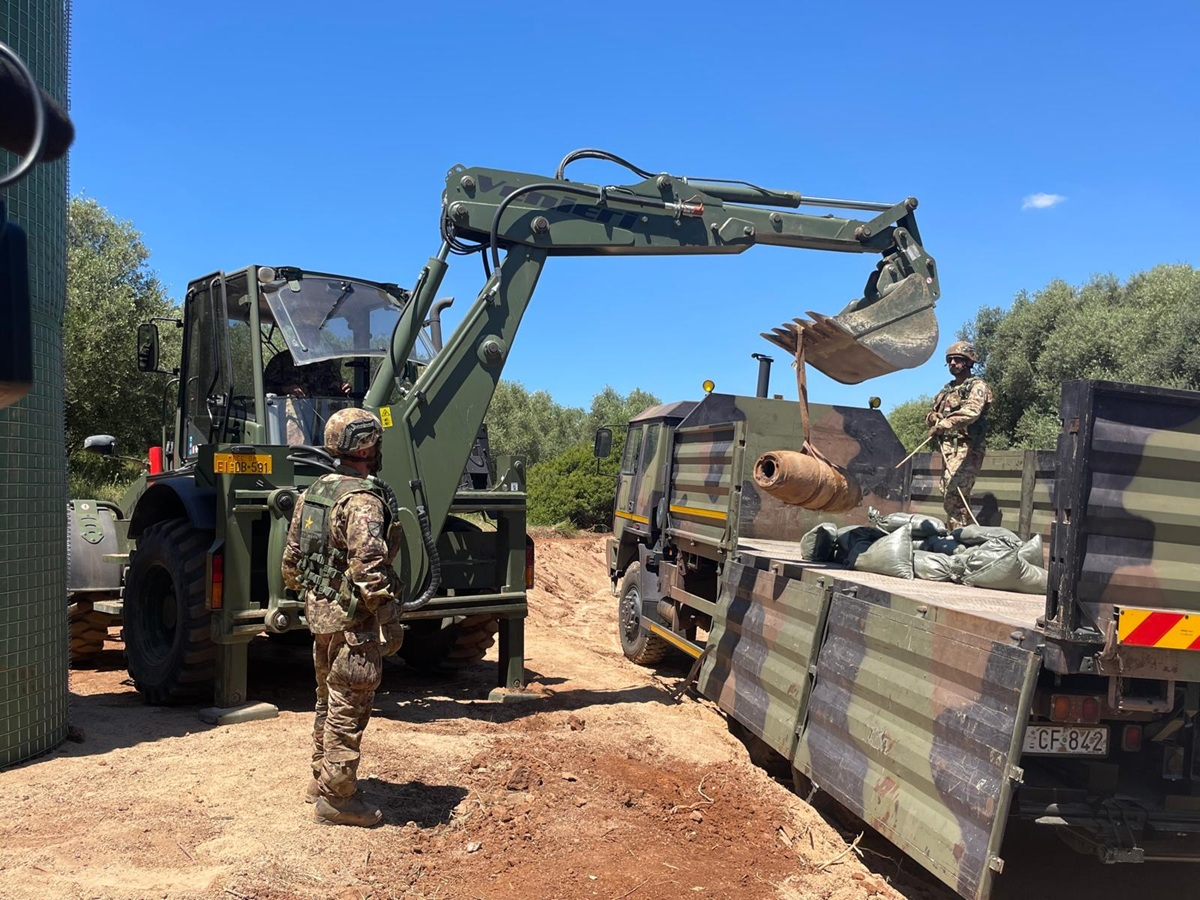
Ferrovieri sappers transporting a defused World War II era bomb in Orbetello

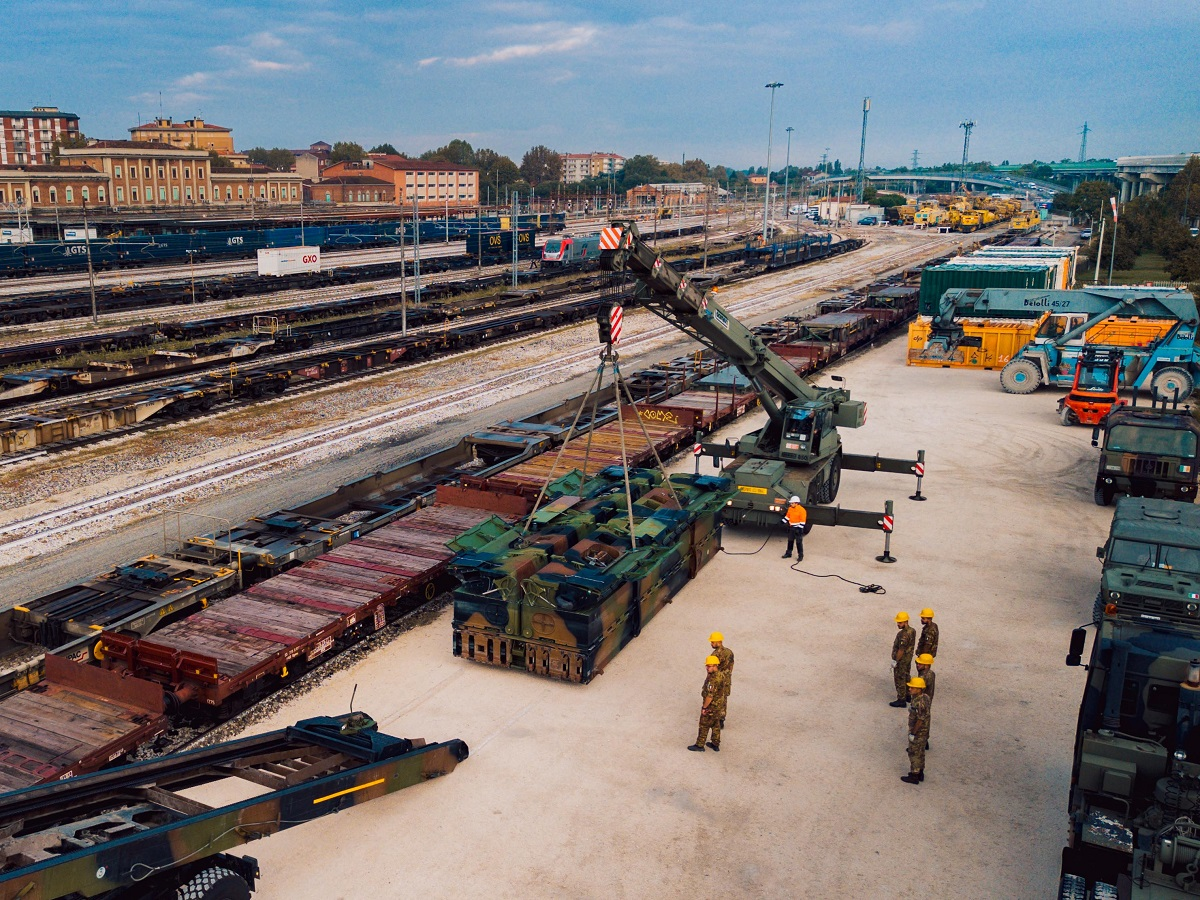
Ferrovieri engineers loading a Motorized Floating Bridge module of the 2nd Pontieri Regiment at the Piacenza railway station

As of 2026 the Ferrovieri Engineer Regiment is organized as follows:

- Ferrovieri Engineer Regiment, in Castel Maggiore
  - Command and Logistic Support Company
  - Ferrovieri Battalion
    - Equipment and Bridges Company
    - Operations Company
    - Special Equipment and Construction Company
    - Road- and Earthworks Company
