= 1st Pontieri Regiment =

Inactive Italian Army bridge engineer unit

- 1° Reggimento Pontieri
- Active: 15 May 1933 — 8 Sept. 1943; 22 Sept. 1992 — 31 Aug. 1995
- Country: Italy
- Branch: Italian Army
- Role: Combat engineers
- Part of: Northeastern Military Region
- Garrison/HQ: Legnano
- Motto(s): "La gloria arride sull'altra sponda"
- Anniversaries: 24 June 1918 - Second Battle of the Piave River
- Decorations: 1× Silver Medal of Military Valor; 1× Bronze Medal of Military Valor

Insignia
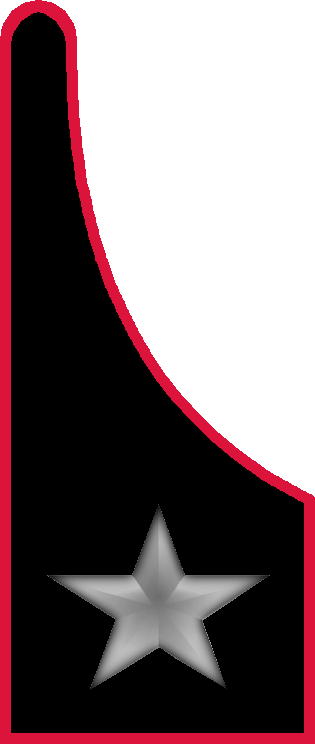
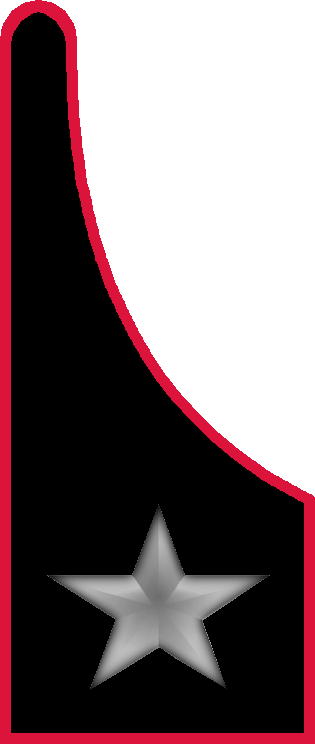
- Pontieri gorget patches

The 1st Pontieri Regiment (Italian: 1° Reggimento Pontieri) is an inactive military engineering unit of the Italian Army last based in Legnano in Lombardy. The term "Pontieri" comes from the Italian word for bridge (Italian: Ponte) and is used to denote units of the Italian Army's engineer arm tasked with the construction and repair of bridges. Enlisted personnel in such units is addressed by the singular form: "Pontiere". The unit was formed in 1933 as 1st Pontieri Regiment (Light Bridges). During World War II the regiment formed battalions and smaller units, which were deployed on all fronts. The regiment was disbanded by invading German forces after the announcement of the Armistice of Cassibile on 8 September 1943. In 1992, the unit was reformed as 1st Pontieri Engineer Battalion. The battalion received the flag and traditions of the 1st Pontieri Regiment. In 1995, the battalion was disbanded. The regiment's anniversary falls, as for all engineer units, on 24 June 1918, the last day of the Second Battle of the Piave River.

== History ==
On 15 May 1933, the 1st Pontieri Regiment (Light Bridges) was formed in Verona with existing Pontieri and Lagunari units of the disbanded Pontieri and Lagunari Regiment: II Pontieri Battalion in Verona, IV Pontieri Battalion in Rome, and V Lagunari Battalion in Venice. The new regiment reorganized these units into two Pontieri battalions, both of which also included two Lagunari companies.

In 1935-36, the regiment provided 15 officers and 375 enlisted for units formed by the 2nd Pontieri Regiment (Heavy Bridges), which were deployed to East Africa for the Second Italo-Ethiopian War. On 1 October 1938, the regiment's two battalions were reorganized and afterwards both consisted of two light bridges companies and one heavy bridges company.

During World War II the regiment's depot in Verona mobilized the following units:

- II and XXXIV Pontieri battalions (heavy bridges)
- XV and XVI motorized Pontieri battalions (light truck-transported bridges)
- XVII, XVIII, XIX, XX, XXI, and XXII Pontieri battalions (light bridges)
- IX Pontieri Battalion (one heavy bridges company and one light bridges company)
- and dozens of autonomous Pontieri companies

The IX Pontieri Battalion served on the Eastern Front, where it earned a Silver Medal of Military Valor, while the battalion's 22nd Company was awarded a Bronze Medal of Military Valor for its last stand on the Don. In the evening of 8 September 1943, the Armistice of Cassibile, which ended hostilities between the Kingdom of Italy and the Anglo-American Allies, was announced by General Dwight D. Eisenhower on Radio Algiers and by Marshal Pietro Badoglio on Italian radio. Germany reacted by invading Italy and the 1st Pontieri Regiment was disbanded soon thereafter by German forces.

On 22 September 1992, the 2nd Pontieri Engineer Regiment's 1st Pontieri Battalion in Legnano became an autonomous unit and was renamed 1st Pontieri Engineer Battalion. The battalion received the flag and traditions of the 1st Pontieri Regiment and consisted of a command, a command and services company, three Pontieri companies, and a special equipment company. The battalion was assigned to the Northeastern Military Region. On 31 August 1995, 1st Pontieri Engineer Battalion was disbanded and the next day the battalion's personnel and materiel was used to reform the 5th Engineer Battalion "Bolsena". Subsequently, the flag of the 1st Pontieri Regiment was returned to the Shrine of the Flags in the Vittoriano in Rome for safekeeping.
