= Stampetta Bridge =

Stampetta Bridge Štampetov most
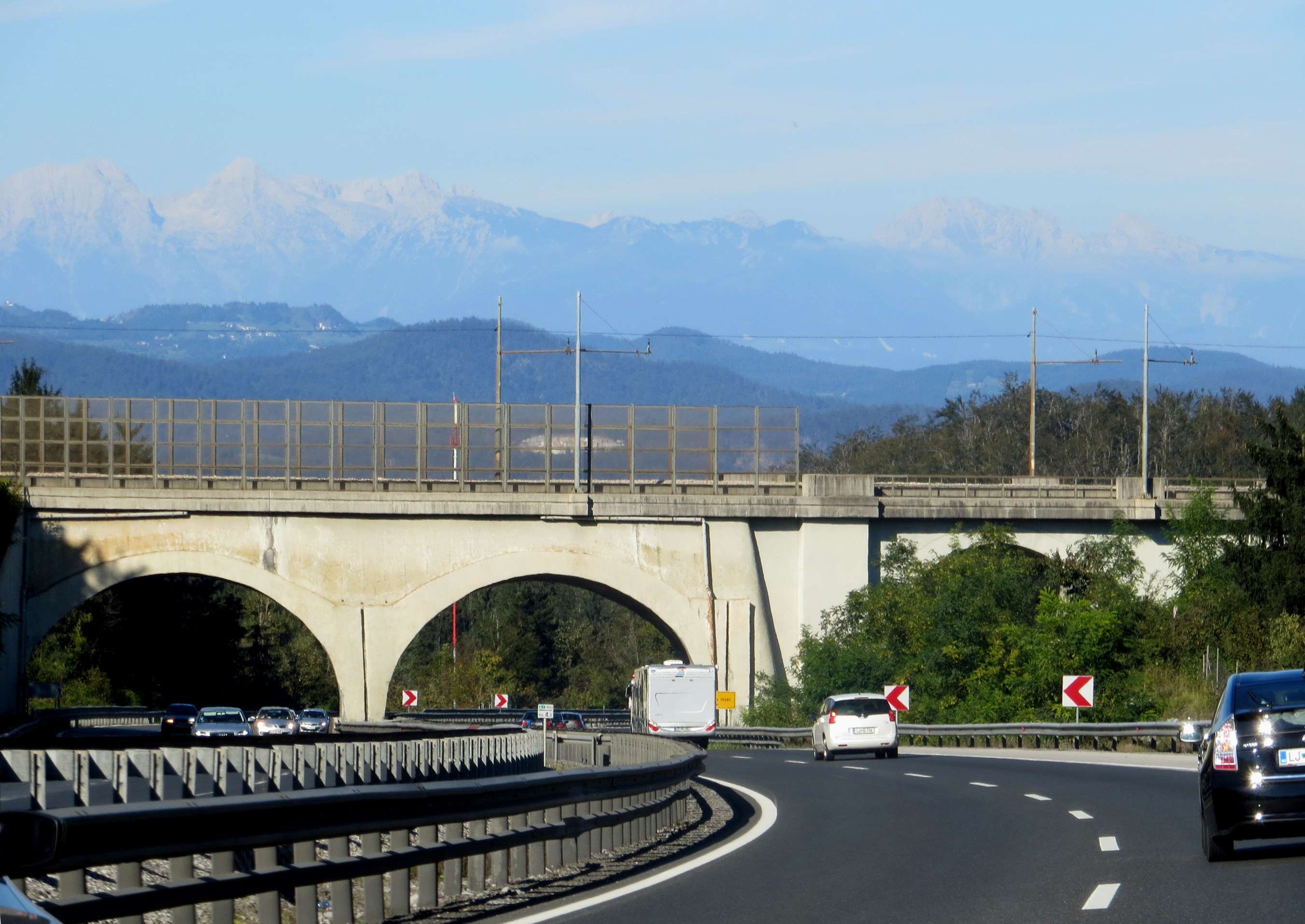
- Coordinates: 45°56′26.74″N 14°16′37.45″E
- Carries: Ljubljana–Sežana Railroad
- Locale: Vrhnika, Slovenia

Characteristics
- Total length: 100.6 m (330 ft)

History
- Construction end: 1856

The Stampetta Bridge (Slovene: Štampetov most, German: Stampetta-Viaduct) is a railroad viaduct south of Vrhnika, Slovenia. It is named after the engineer that built it.

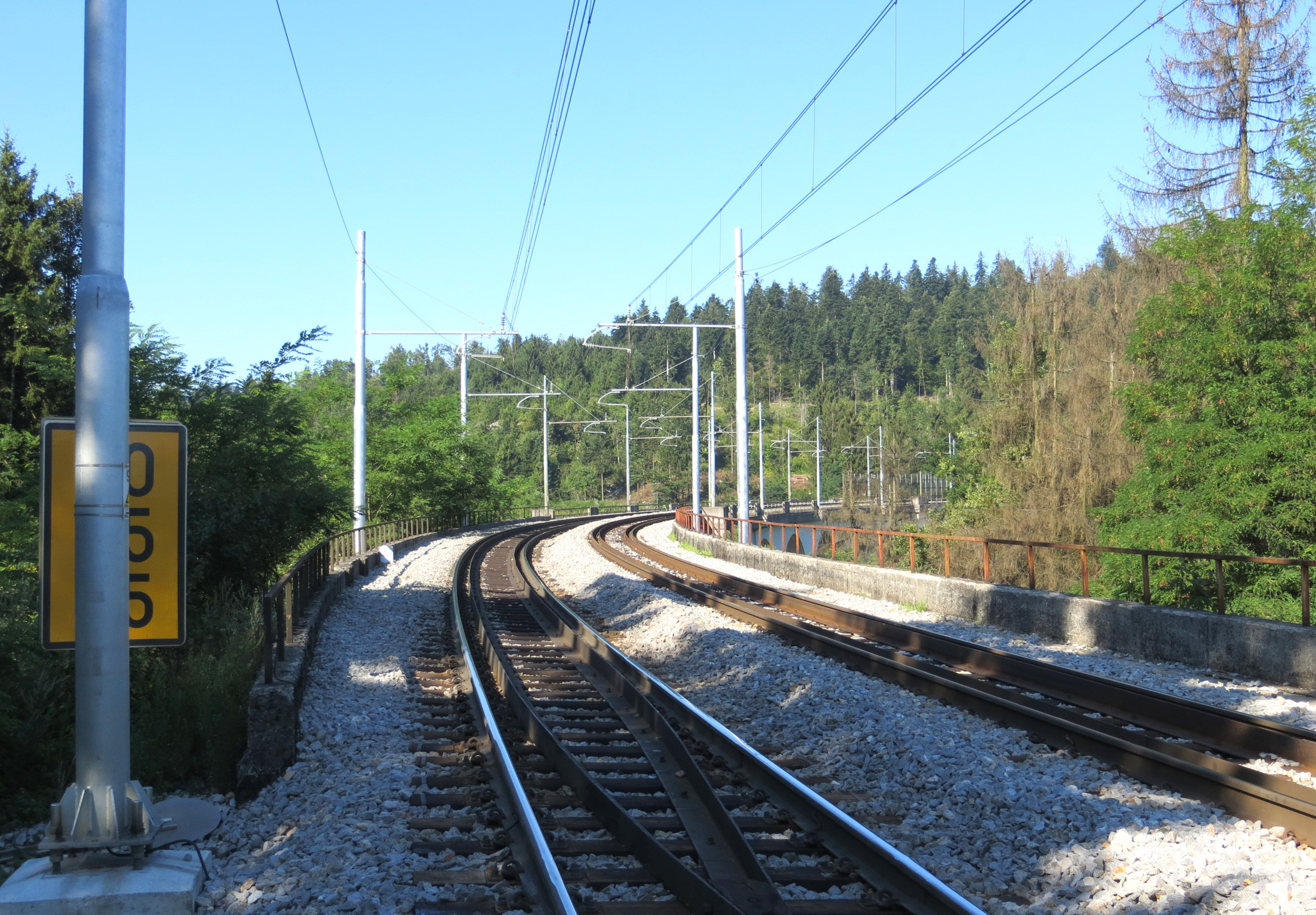
Eastern approach to the bridge

The Stampetta Bridge is originally a brick and stone structure that was built in 1856 as part of the Austrian Southern Railway. During the Second World War, the bridge was badly damaged. It was first damaged in 1941, but repaired by the Royal Italian Army's Ferrovieri Engineer Regiment. Sabotage attacks were later carried out by Partisan forces in October 1943, June 1944, and September 1944 in order to disrupt German supply lines. The bridge was repaired from 1945 to 1946.

During the Yugoslav era, the Railway Workers Hiking Club (Planinsko društvo Železničar) of Ljubljana held an annual walk across the Stampetta Bridge. Today the bridge also spans the A1 Freeway, where it is categorized as a 14.5 m (48 ft) tunnel. During construction of the freeway, part of the bridge was altered; an additional two arches were added to the original seven arches.
