= Domenico Bologna =

Italian painter

Domenico Bologna (August 22, 1845 – 1885) was an Italian painter, mainly of landscapes with figures.

He was born in Turin. He trained under professors Antonio Fontanesi and Francesco Gamba in Accademia Albertina. Among his works are: Dopo Vespro, exhibited in 1875 at Milan; Tramonto, exhibited in 1881 at Milan; Il Tanaro, bought by the Società promotrice of Fine Arts in Genoa; Le sponde del Po at Turin, sold in 1878 at St Petersburg, Russia, Le sponde del Tanaro; Inverno; Pascolo; and Tramonto, exhibited in 1883 at Rome.
