= Cristoforo da Bologna =

Italian painter

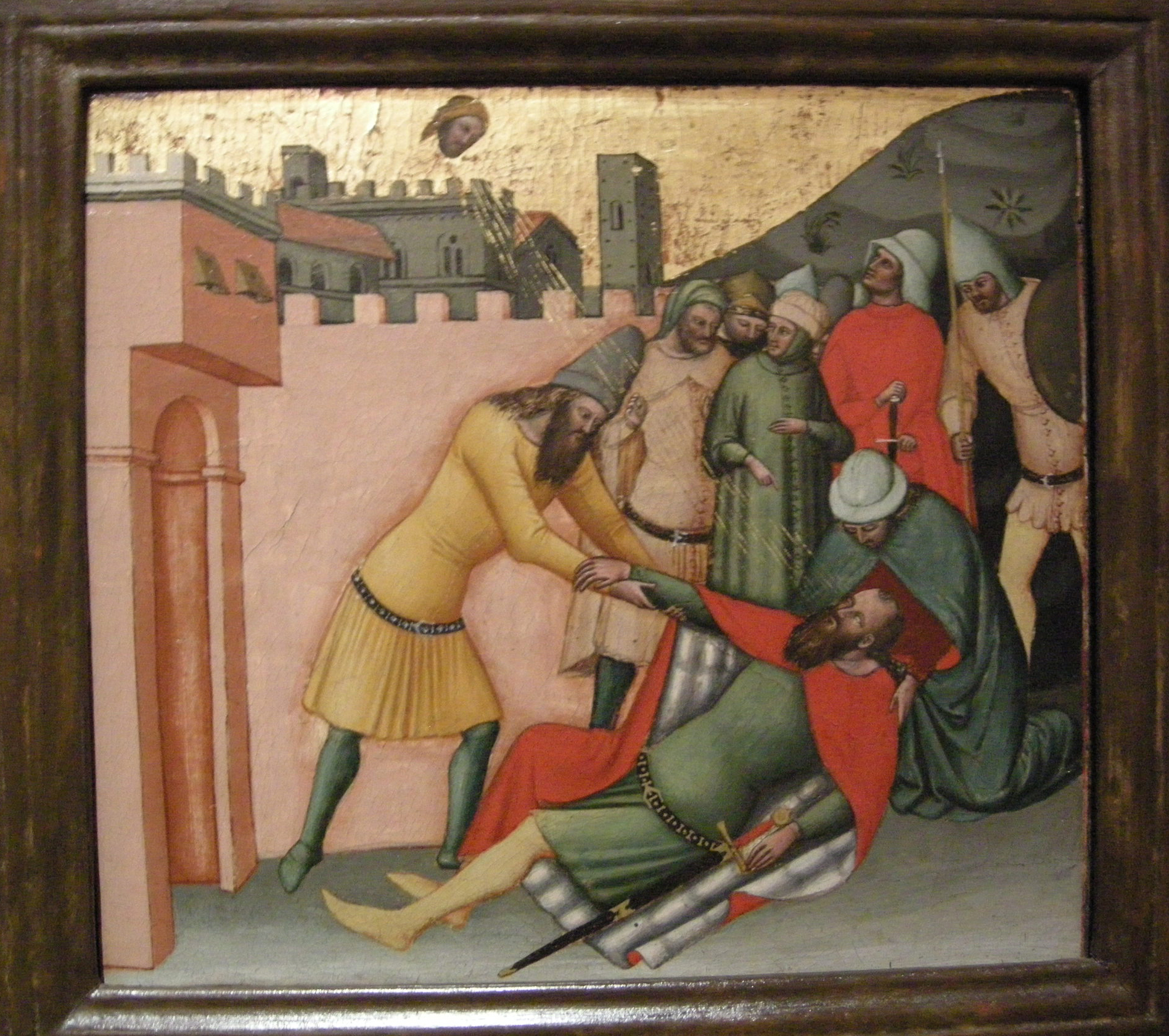
fresco Stories of the New Testament, Conversion of Paul the Apostle by Cristoforo da Bologna

Cristoforo da Bologna was an Italian painter. He was active in Bologna, Modena, and Ferrara. He painted at the close of the 14th and the beginning of the 15th century.

== Sources ==
- Bryan, Michael (1886). Robert Edmund Graves (ed.). Dictionary of Painters and Engravers, Biographical and Critical. Vol. I: A-K. London: George Bell and Sons. p. 148.
