= BAP Coronel Bolognesi =

Four ships of the Peruvian Navy have been named BAP Coronel Bolognesi after Peruvian Army hero Francisco Bolognesi:

- BAP Coronel Bolognesi (1906), commissioned in 1907, was an Almirante Grau-class cruiser
- BAP Coronel Bolognesi (CL-82), commissioned in 1959, was a Crown Colony-class cruiser
- BAP Coronel Bolognesi (DD-70), commissioned in 1982, was a Friesland-class destroyer
- BAP Coronel Bolognesi (FM-57), commissioned in 2006, is a Lupo-class frigate
