= Franco Bolognese =

Franco Bolognese (14th century) was an Italian illuminator, cited by Dante as having supplanted Oderisio da Gubbio as the leading artist in his field.

There are no documents recording him nor any signed or documented works. Dante's name for him, the only record of Franco that we have, as Franco Bolognese likely indicates that he mainly worked elsewhere, probably in Padua, the major rival university city where Bolognese illuminators worked extensively. Whereas Bologna recorded legal transactions in extensively preserved civic records, Paduan archives of the period are far less systematic. The accounts of his activity at the papal court by Giorgio Vasari and Carlo Cesare Malvasia are thought to be fictitious; the signature on the Madonna in the former Malvezzi collection signed and dated to 1313 is clearly a forgery, as it is clearly much later and was attributed to the 15th century artist Michele di Matteo da Bologna by Roberto Longhi.

While most art historians have considered him a 13th-century Byzantinising "Second Style" artist, Mario Salmi suggested him to be a Giotto-influenced artist of choirbooks in Modena.

Dante's comparison with Giotto indicates a 14th-century artist, and an intervention in Francesco da Barberino's Offizuolo similar to Dante's comparison between Oderisio and Franco suggests he might be the 'Maestro del 1328' working in a modern idiom parallel to, rather than dependent upon, Giotto. His influence upon Bolognese painters claimed by Malvasia was probably indirect, since by the 1330s the two professions were usually practiced by different artists, and certainly no illuminations by Vitale are known. Moreover, given Franco's absence from Bolognese archives suggests that few of his works would have been available to them.

Franco Bolognese is described as having supplanted his predecessor, 'Oderisi', in Divine Comedy by Oderisi himself in Purgatory.

== Sources ==
- Alessandro Conti, La miniature bolognese, ALFA, Bologna, 1981, esp. pp. 7, 39, 44.
- Giovanni Valagussa in Dizionario Biografico dei miniatori italiani, ed. Milvia Bollati, Sylvestre Bonnard, Milan, 2004, pp. 239–40, and M. Medica, ibid., pp. 473–75.
- Officiolum di Francesco da Barberino, ed. Carlo Bertoncello Brotto and Enrico Malato, Salerno, Rome, 2015, fols. 169-72 (out of original sequence), and Commentario, ed. Sandra Bertelli et al., Salerno, Rome, 2016.
