= Joseph Bologne =

Joseph Bologne may refer to:

- Joseph Bologne, Chevalier de Saint-Georges (1745–1799), French fencer, composer, violinist and conductor
- Joseph Bologne (politician) (1871–1959), Belgian socialist politician

== See also ==
- Joseph Bologna (1934–2017), American actor
