= Étienne-Antoine Boulogne =

French archbishop (1747–1825)

The Most Reverend Étienne-Antoine Boulogne
- Archbishop-Bishop of Troyes; Count of Boulogne
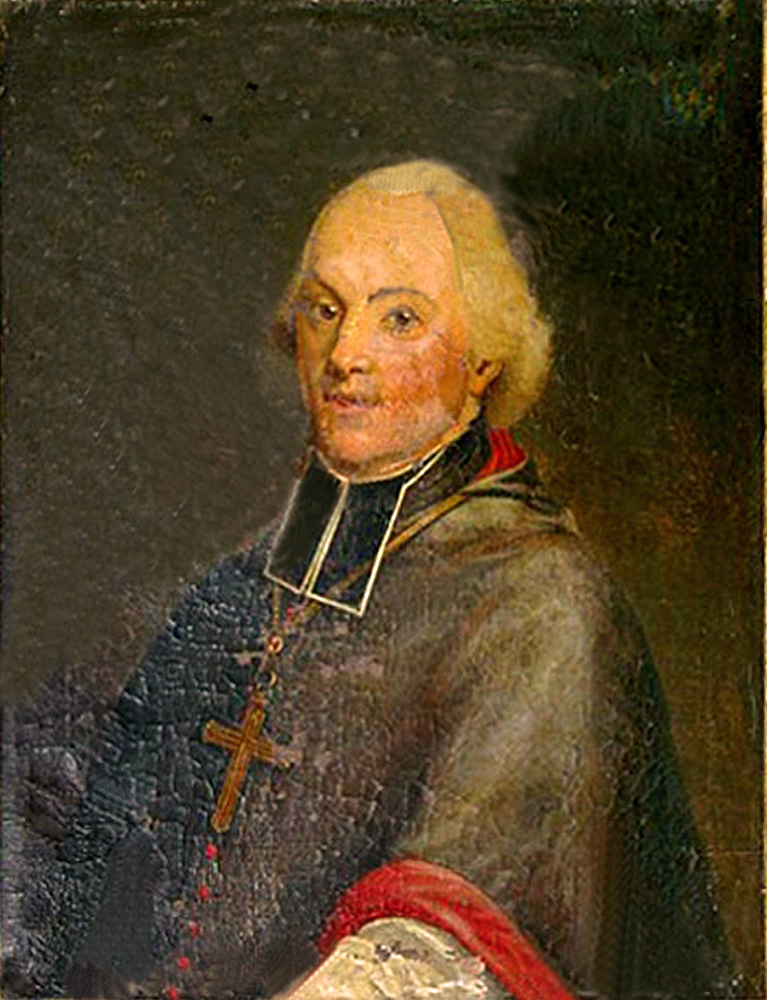
- In office: 1809–1825
- Predecessor: Louis-Apollinaire de La Tour du Pin-Montauban
- Successor: Jacques-Louis-David de Seguin des Hons

Orders
- Ordination: 1771

Personal details
- Born: 26 December 1747 Avignon, France
- Died: 13 March 1825 (aged 77) Troyes, France

Étienne-Antoine Boulogne (26 December 1747 – 13 March 1825) was a French cleric of the Roman Catholic Church. He served as Bishop of Troyes from 1809 to 1825.

== Early life ==
Étienne-Antoine Boulogne was born at Avignon on 26 December 1747. He was the son of poor parents and obtained an education from the Christian Brothers of his native city. He exhibited talent and industry and was ordained in 1771. His oratorical gifts attracted general attention, and he soon became one of the most admired preachers in Paris. For a while the Archbishop of Paris interdicted him from preaching; but was eventually induced to withdraw his opposition when a eulogy composed by the Abbé Boulogne on the late Dauphin, the father of Louis XVI, obtained a prize.

== French Revolution ==
The Abbé's reputation as a preacher grew steadily. He preached the Lenten sermons aux Quinze-Vingts in 1786, and at the court of Versailles in 1787. In one of his sermons at court he pointed out the fearful storm which, he thought, was threatening society, brought on by the false philosophy and irreligion of the day. Boulogne refused to take the oath of the Civil Constitution of the Clergy demanded by the laws and was in consequence stripped of his titles and benefices. He also refused to leave his country in her need. He was arrested three times, but each time succeeded in recovering his liberty; condemned to deportation on another occasion for having defended Christianity against the attacks of Larevellière Lépeaux, he again evaded the decree. The worst of the revolutionary storm had scarcely blown over when he reappeared, contending in the Annales Catholiques, of which he had become the sole editor, with unbelievers and those of the clergy who had taken the oath of the Civil Constitution. In spite of incessant and fierce opposition he published this magazine under one title or another until the year 1807. He also resumed his labours as preacher with authority and success. Napoleon, always in search of men of talent who were capable of furthering his ambitious designs, first appointed the Abbé Boulogne his chaplain, then Bishop of Troyes.

== Bishop of Troyes ==
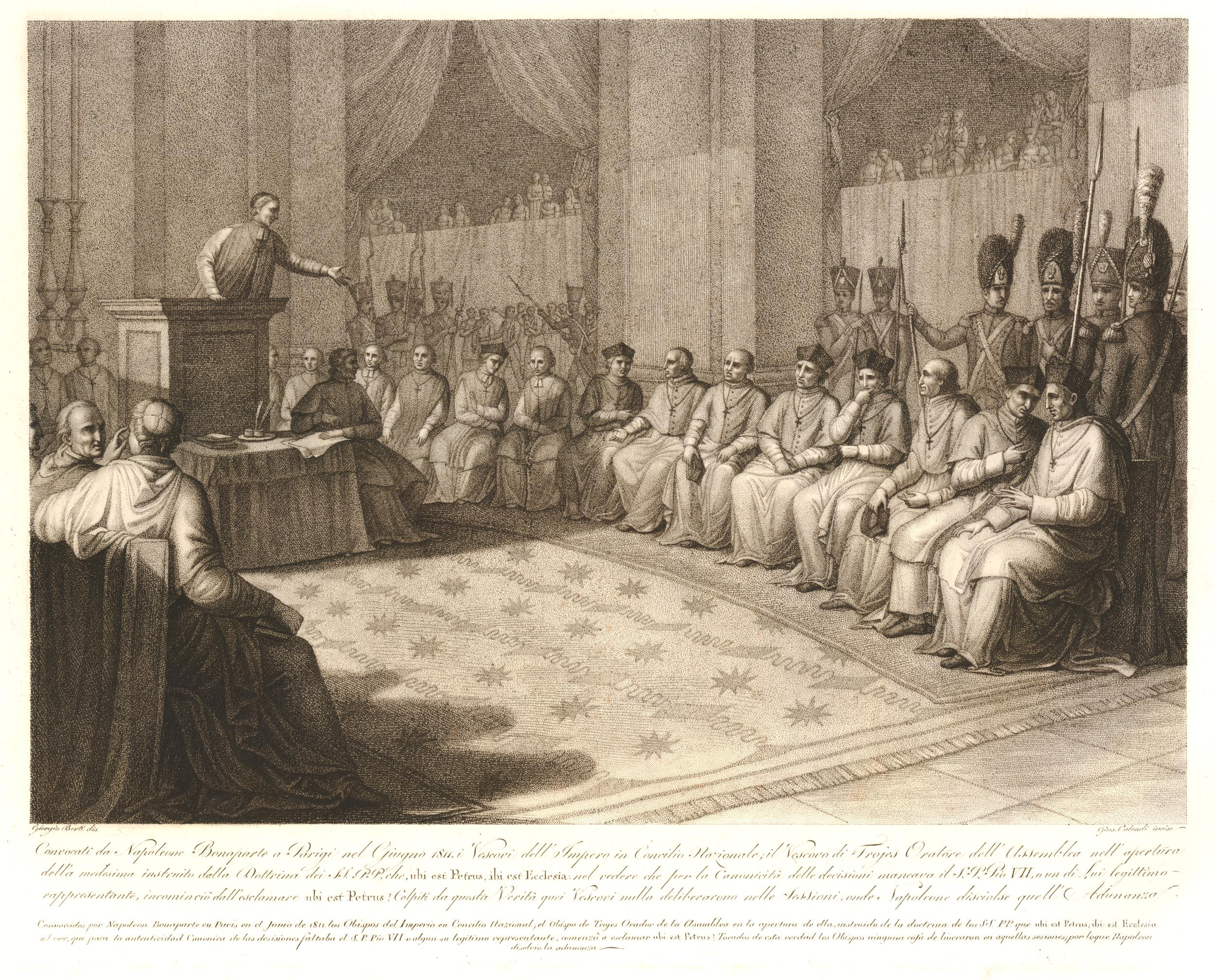
The Bishop of Troyes addressing the National Council, 1811

In 1811 Napoleon had the bishops of France and Northern Italy summoned to a council to be held at Paris. Bishop Boulogne preached the opening sermon in the church of Notre Dame. He concluded:

Whatever vicissitudes the See of Peter may experience, whatever be the state and condition of his august successor, we shall firmly cling to him with bonds of filial respect and reverence; the See may be displaced, it cannot be destroyed; wherever that See may be, the others will take their stand around it; whithersoever that the See moves, thither all Catholics will follow; for there alone is the last link of true succession; there the centre of the Church's government; there, the deposit of Apostolic tradition.

Napoleon, holding Pius VII in captivity away from Rome, was using violence and deception to extort from the assembled prelates a decision that would enable him to do without ecclesiastical investiture for the bishops of his choice. Yet his displeasure with Boulogne's sermon did not prevent the assembled bishops from choosing the preacher as secretary of the council and member of the committee on the reply to the imperial message. When this committee reported that there was no authority in France that could supply, even provisionally and for a case of necessity, the absence of the pope's Bulls of episcopal investiture, Napoleon dissolved the council and that very night Bishop Boulogne was arrested and imprisoned. He was not restored to his flock before the events of 1814.

== Archbishop ==
During the first Bourbon Restoration, Boulogne was chosen to preach the funeral oration of Louis XVI, and, at the second, he preached, on 6 January 1816, his well-known sermon "La France veut son Dieu, la France veut son roi", Louis XVIII made him peer of France and Leo XII granted him the title of archbishop bestowing on him the pallium. He died at Troyes on 13 March 1825, aged seventy-seven.
