= Marco Bolognesi =

Italian film director and photographer

Marco Bolognesi is an artist working in a variety of media such as drawing and painting, cinema, photo- and videography.

Bolognesi was born in 1974 in Bologna, Italy into a family of artists. His youth was spent in an artistic environment, and he went on to attend the School of Drama, Arts and Music at the University of Bologna.

At the age of 20, Bolognesi illustrated a selection of works by the poet Roberto Roversi, and in the following year he collaborated with the graphic artist Guido Crepax on one of his comic strips. In 1994 he shot his first short film, ‘Giustizia e Verità’ (Justice and Truth) about the victims of terrorism, which was then shown at the Venice Biennale. In this experimental documentary, images and music were deeply interwoven, as they were in his second short film on the same theme, ‘il Partito del Silenzio’ (The Silent Party), made in 1996. Subsequently, both films were presented in Rome by the Academy Award-winning composer Ennio Morricone. The film was also shown internationally at many Italian cultural institutes.

Bolognesi then focused on cinema, working as a director's assistant for Daniele Luchetti, among other directors. His interest then shifted to the medium of photography. Bolognesi's first project was with Nobel Prize winner Dario Fo.

In 2002, Bolognesi moved to London where he won the artist in residence award at the Italian cultural institute, and undertook his first major photographic project. The outcome was Woodland, a series of stills in collaboration with fashion designers such as Vivienne Westwood, Alexander McQueen, Kei Kagami and Dolce & Gabbana.

== Recent works ==
In 2006, Bolognesi presented his photographic work Woodland at the Trafalgar Hotel in London, which culminated in the photographic series Synteborg in 2007. In the spring of 2008, Bolognesi made the short film Black Hole on the theme of hybrids and cyborgs. In summer 2008, one of his stills was internationally shown as part of the 'collezione farnesina experimenta', a touring exhibition of Italy's most influential artists. 2008 saw the international release of Dark Star, Bolognesi's second photographic publication, which was based on the 1974 film by Peter Greenaway which includes a selection of his photographic works accompanied by a sci-fi short and additional text.

In 2009, Einaudi will present a collaborative and experimental art/comics/fiction book by Bolognesi and Carlo Lucarelli. Also in 2009, Bolognesi exhibited some installation work at the Fondazione Solares in Parma, Italy.

== Publications by Marco Bolognesi ==
- La Cartamatta Published by Pendragon, Bologna, 1997.
- Woodland Published by Bomar Edition London, 2006.
- Dark Star Published by Bomar Edition and Silvana Editoriale, 2008.
- Protocollo Published by Einaudi Publishers, 2009.

== Filmography ==
- Giustizia e Verita (Justice and truth), short, 1994.
- Il Partito del silenzio (the silence party), short, 1996.
- Black hole, short, 2008.
- "The Truth on Sendai City", feature film, 2024.
- "Blackflag", feature film, 2025
