= Jose Bolognesi =

Brazilian footballer

Personal information
- Place of birth: Brazil
- Position: Midfielder

Senior career*
Years	Team	Apps	(Gls)
1965–1966	Toronto Roma		
1967	Pittsburgh Phantoms	1	(0)
1968	Toronto Ukrainia		
- * Club domestic league appearances and goals

Jose Bolognesi is a Brazilian former footballer who played as a midfielder.

== Career ==
Bolognesi played in the Eastern Canada Professional Soccer League with Toronto Roma. He re-signed with Toronto for the 1966 season. He was selected to the league's all-star team in 1966. In 1967, he played in the National Professional Soccer League with the Pittsburgh Phantoms. He appeared in one match for Pittsburgh. On August 5, 1967, he was released from his contract along with teammate Olivio Lacerda. In 1968, he played in the National Soccer League with Toronto Ukrainia.
