= Ferdinando Bologna =

Italian art critic (1925–2019)

Ferdinando Bologna (27 September 1925 – 3 April 2019) was an Italian art historian.

A pupil of Pietro Toesca and collaborator of Roberto Longhi, he was emeritus professor of medieval and modern art history at the University of Rome Tor Vergata. He was also professor of "Methodology and history of art criticism" at the Suor Orsola Benincasa University of Naples.

== Biography ==
Bologna graduated in literature and philosophy at the Sapienza University of Rome in 1947, discussing a thesis in Medieval and Modern Art History with Pietro Toesca. In 1948 he won the "Max Ascoli" scholarship at the Italian Institute of Historical Studies founded the previous year by Benedetto Croce in Naples, where he attended the courses of Benedetto Croce, Federico Chabod and Giovanni Pugliese Carratelli. In 1951 he graduated in "Art flamand: histoire et technique” at the Brussel Art Seminar in Brussels, where he also worked with Paul Coremans at the Musée du Cinquantenaire.

From 1955 he taught medieval and modern art history and from 1958 he was a tenured professor at the Academy of Fine Arts in Naples and then in Rome. In 1965 he became full professor of medieval art history at the Faculty of Magisterium of the University of Messina, then moving to the University of Naples in 1967 and to the University of Tor Vergara in Rome in 1984.

As part of his university career he held numerous positions at numerous academic and cultural institutions: director of the institute of art history and of the related specialization course at the University of Naples, member of the technical committee for the establishment of the faculty of literature and philosophy at the University of Siena, member of the National Council for Cultural and Environmental Heritage, scientific advisor for art history at the Italian Institute of Philosophical Studies in Naples, member of theItalian Institute of Human Sciences from Florence.

From 1970 he was ordinary member of the National Society of Sciences, Letters and Arts in Naples, and ordinary non-resident member of the Pontanian Academy of Naples for the history, archeology and philology class. In 2003 he founded the six-monthly periodical “Confronto. Studies and research in European art history".

Bologna died on 3 April 2019.
