= Bononia =

Bononia may refer to:

the Roman name of several populated places and jurisdictions.

- Banoštor, a village in Serbia
- Bologna, a city in Italy
- Boulogne-sur-Mer, a city in France
- Vidin, ancient name of the city in Bulgaria

Other

- Bononia University Press, the publisher of the University of Bologna
- Bononia, Poland, a village in Poland
- Bononia (titular see), the ancient bishopric of Vidin, now a Latin Catholic titular see
- Bononia Cove, Antarctica, a geographical feature named after Bononia, Bulgaria
- Bononia (moth), a genus in the family Noctuidae
- 361 Bononia, a large main-belt asteroid
