= Castel Maggiore =

- Comune
- Comune di Castel Maggiore
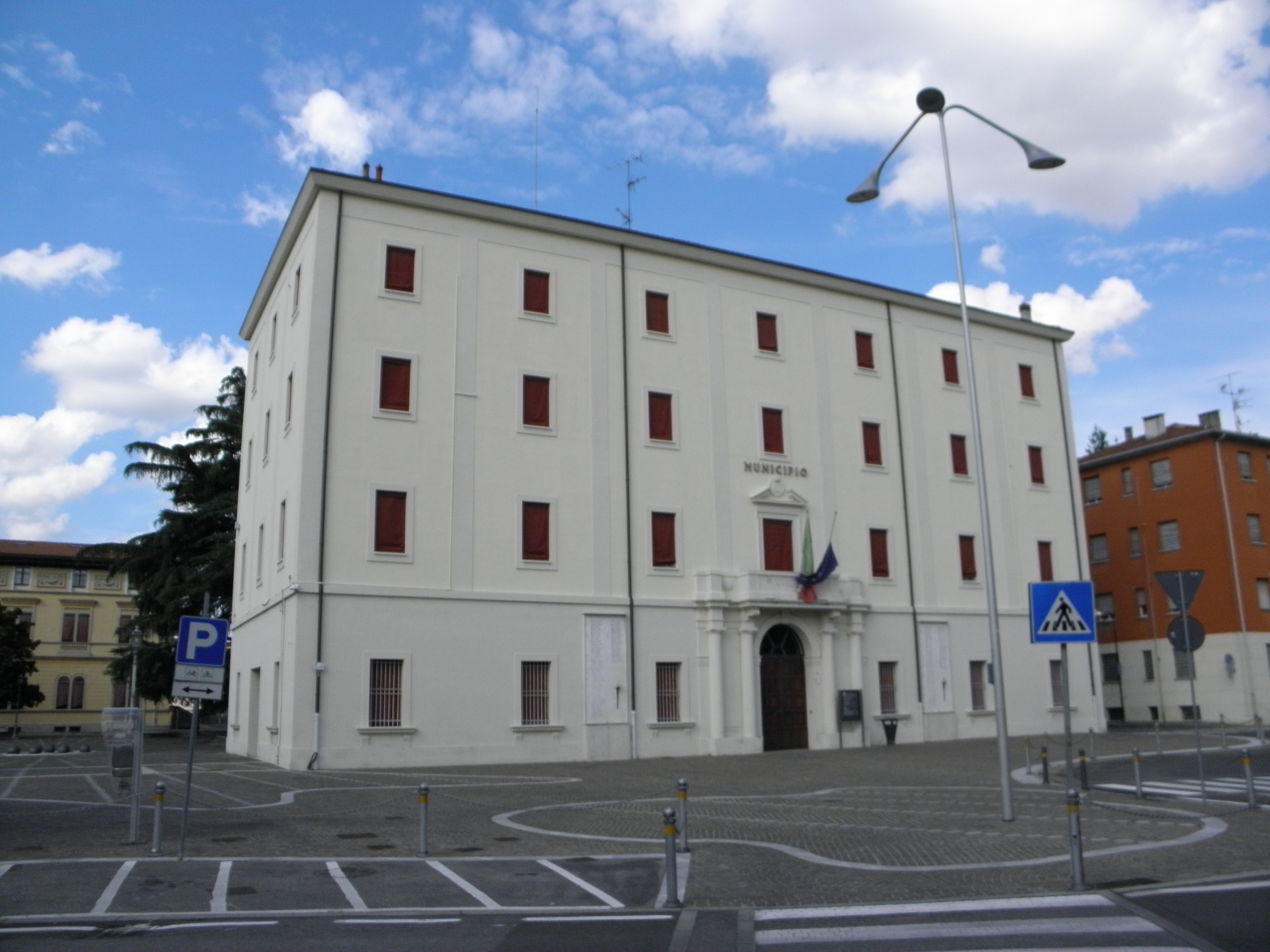
- Town hall.

- Coat of arms

- Location within Italy Location within Emilia-Romagna
- Coordinates: 44°34′30″N 11°21′49″E
- Country: Italy
- Region: Emilia-Romagna
- Metropolitan city: Bologna (BO)
- Frazioni: Boschetto, Primo Maggio, Trebbo, Sabbiuno

Government
  - Mayor: Belinda Gottardi

Area
  - Total: 30.9 km^{2} (11.9 sq mi)
- Elevation: 29 m (95 ft)

Population (31 December 2017)
  - Total: 18,349
  - Density: 594/km^{2} (1,540/sq mi)
- Demonym: Castelmaggioresi
- Time zone: UTC+1 (CET)
  - Summer (DST): UTC+2 (CEST)
- Postal code: 40013
- Dialing code: 051
- Patron saint: St. Andrew
- Saint day: October 30
- Website: Official website

Castel Maggiore (Bolognese: Castèl Mażåur) is an Italian commune in the Metropolitan City of Bologna, Emilia-Romagna, northern Italy, located 9 kilometres (6 mi) north of the centre of Bologna. Though its name recalls a translation like Great Castle, the name is actually derived from the earlier name Castaniolo Maggiore, which means "Bigger Chestnut Tree", in relation to another nearby village still today named "Castagnolino", meaning "Small Chestnut Tree".

== History ==
The first documents conveying the existence of the Comune, in ancient times called Castaniolo (meaning "Little chestnut") date back to the 10th century. The legend narrates that the name comes from a big chestnut trunk that should have floated into the territory of the comune through the Canale Navile (a navigable drain canal).

Afterwards Castaniolo was marked by the nickname of Maggiore (Major) in order to distinguish it from a homonymous hamlet (now Castaniolo Minore) of the comune of Bentivoglio.

The name was changed into the one it still carries nowadays during Napoleon's era, in 1818, in which jurisdiction on today's hamlets has been recognised.

The town underwent heavy bomb attacks during World War II because of the passage of the railroad linking Bologna and Padua.

== Twin towns — sister cities ==
Castel Maggiore is twinned with:

- Ingré, France
- Drensteinfurt, Germany
