= Artur Phleps =

Waffen-SS officer (1881–1944)

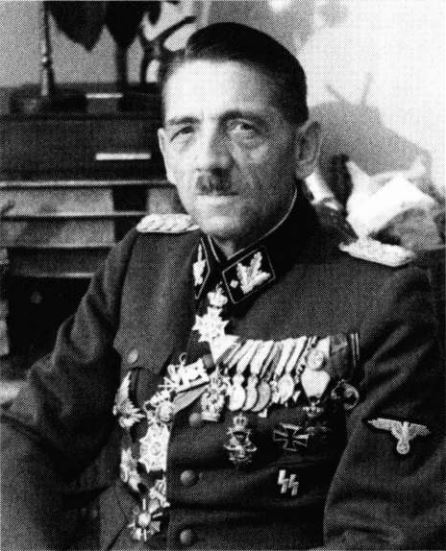
- Phleps in 1942
- Born: Artur Gustav Martin Phleps; 29 November 1881; Birthälm, Szeben County, Austria-Hungary
- Died: 21 September 1944 (aged 62); Șimand, Arad, Romania
- Spouse: Grete
- Children: Reinhart Phleps; Irmingard
- Military career
- Allegiance: Austria-Hungary; Kingdom of Romania; Germany
- Branch: Austro-Hungarian Army; Royal Romanian Army; Waffen-SS
- Service years: 1900–1944
- Rank: SS-Obergruppenführer und General der Waffen-SS (Lieutenant General)
- Nickname: Papa Phleps
- Unit: SS Motorised Division Wiking
- Commands: 7th SS Volunteer Mountain Division Prinz Eugen; V SS Mountain Corps
- Conflicts: World War I; Hungarian–Romanian War of 1919; World War II
- Awards: Knight's Cross of the Iron Cross with Oak Leaves

Artur Gustav Martin Phleps (German pronunciation: [ˈaʁtuːɐ̯ ˈɡʊstaf ˈmaʁtiːn ˈflɛps]; 29 November 1881 – 21 September 1944) was an Austro-Hungarian, Romanian and Nazi German army officer who held the rank of SS-Obergruppenführer und General der Waffen-SS (lieutenant general) in the Waffen-SS during World War II. An Austro-Hungarian Army officer before and during World War I, Phleps specialised in mountain warfare and logistics, and had been promoted to Oberstleutnant (lieutenant colonel) by the end of the war. During the interwar period he joined the Romanian Army, reaching the rank of General de divizie (major general), and also became an adviser to King Carol. After he spoke out against the government, he was sidelined and asked to be dismissed from the army.

In 1941, he left Romania and joined the Waffen-SS as an SS-Standartenführer (colonel) under his mother's maiden name of Stolz. Seeing action on the Eastern Front as a regimental commander with the SS Motorised Division Wiking, he later raised and commanded the 7th SS Volunteer Mountain Division Prinz Eugen, raised the 13th Waffen Mountain Division of the SS Handschar (1st Croatian), and commanded the V SS Mountain Corps. Units under his command committed many crimes against the civilian population of the Independent State of Croatia, German-occupied territory of Serbia and Italian governorate of Montenegro. His final appointment was as plenipotentiary general in south Siebenbürgen (Transylvania) and the Banat, during which he organised the evacuation of the Volksdeutsche (ethnic Germans) of Siebenbürgen to the Reich. In addition to the Knight's Cross of the Iron Cross, Phleps was awarded the German Cross in Gold, and after he was shot and killed in the aftermath of the 1944 Romanian coup d'état, he was awarded the Oak Leaves to his Knight's Cross.

== Early life ==
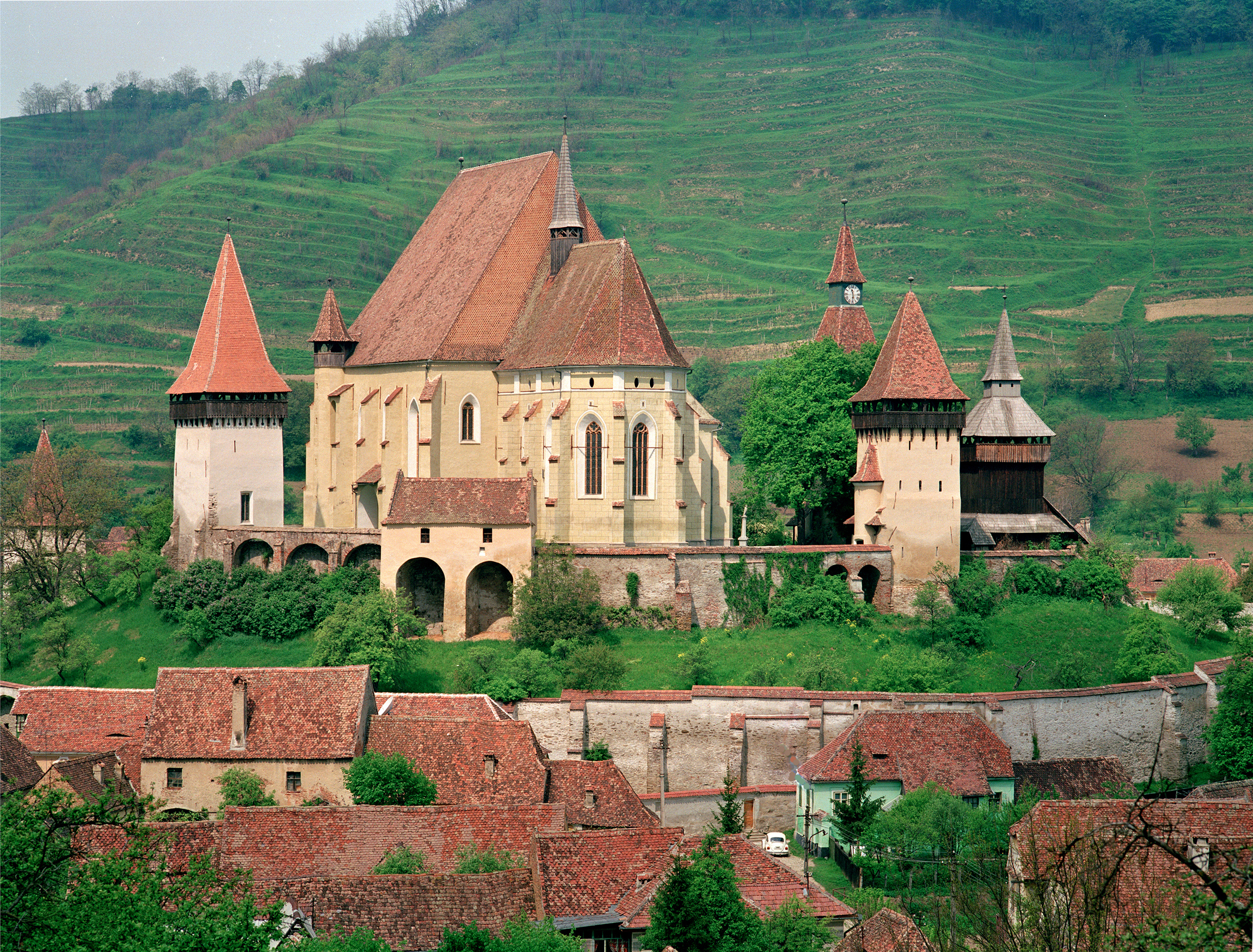
Phleps's birthplace of Birthälm in Siebenbürgen (modern-day Transylvania)

Phleps was born in what was then called Birthälm (Biertan), near Hermannstadt (Sibiu) in Siebenbürgen, then a part of the Austro-Hungarian Empire (modern-day Transylvania, Romania). At the time, Siebenbürgen was densely populated by Romanian ethnic Germans, commonly referred to as Transylvanian Saxons. He was the third son of a surgeon, Dr. Gustav Phleps, and Sophie (née Stolz), the daughter of a peasant. Both families had lived in Siebenbürgen for centuries. After finishing the Lutheran Realschule school in Hermannstadt, Phleps entered the Imperial and Royal cadet school in Pressburg (Bratislava in the modern-day Slovak Republic) in 1900, and on 1 November 1901 was commissioned as a Leutnant (lieutenant) in the 3rd Regiment of the Tiroler Kaiserjäger (Tyrolean mountain infantry of the Kaiser).

In 1903, Phleps was transferred to the 11th Feldjäger (rifle) Battalion in Güns (in modern-day Hungary), and in 1905 was accepted into the Theresian Military Academy in Wiener Neustadt. He completed his studies in two years, and was endorsed as suitable for service in the General Staff. Following promotion to Oberleutnant (first lieutenant) he was transferred to the staff of the 13th Infantry Regiment at Esseg in Slavonia, then to the 6th Infantry Division in Graz. This was followed by a promotion to Hauptmann (captain) in 1911, along with a position on the staff of the XV Army Corps in Sarajevo. There, he specialised in mobilisation and communications, in the difficult terrain of Bosnia and Herzegovina.

== World War I ==
At the outbreak of World War I, Phleps was serving with the staff of the 32nd Infantry Division in Budapest. His division was involved in the early stages of the Serbian campaign, during which Phleps was transferred to the operations staff of the Second Army. This Army was soon withdrawn from the Serbian front and deployed via the Carpathian Mountains to the Austro-Hungarian province of Galicia (modern-day Poland and Ukraine), to defend against a successful offensive by the Russian Imperial army. The Second Army continued to fight the Russians in and around the Carpathians through the winter of 1914–1915. In 1915 Phleps was again transferred, this time to Armeegruppe Rohr commanded by General der Kavallerie (lieutenant general) Franz Rohr von Denta, which was formed in the Austrian Alps, in response to the Italian declaration of war in May 1915. Armeegruppe Rohr became the basis for the formation of the 10th Army, which was headquartered in Villach. Phleps subsequently became the deputy quartermaster of the 10th Army, responsible for organising the supply of the troops fighting the Italians in the mountains.

On 1 August 1916, Phleps was promoted to major. Later that month, King Ferdinand I of Romania led the Kingdom of Romania in joining the Triple Entente, subsequently invading Phleps's homeland of Siebenbürgen. On 27 August, Phleps became the chief of staff of the 72nd Infantry Division, which was involved in Austro-Hungarian operations to repel the Romanian invasion. He remained in this theatre of operations for the next two years, ultimately serving as the chief quartermaster of the German 9th Army, and was awarded the Iron Cross 2nd Class, on 27 January 1917. In 1918 he returned to the mountains when he was transferred to Armeegruppe Tirol, and ended the war as an Oberstleutnant (lieutenant colonel) and chief quartermaster for the entire Alpine front.

== Between the wars ==
After the war, the Austro-Hungarian Empire was dissolved and Phleps returned to his homeland, which had become part of the Kingdom of Romania, officiated later under the Treaty of Trianon. He was appointed as commander of the Saxon National Guard, a militia which was serving with the Romanian Army and formed of the German-speaking people of Siebenbürgen, in 1918.

On 1 April 1919, he was named chief of staff of the 16th Infantry Division, a unit formed from Transylvanian volunteers under the command of a Romanian officer, General de brigadă (brigadier general) Alexandru Hanzu. In this role, Phleps confronted the Hungarian communist revolutionary government of Béla Kun, which fought against Romania in 1919. He participated in the Carei-Debrecen offensive, and in the crossing of the Tisza, distinguishing himself in the battles for the bridgehead at Tokaj and at Miskolc.

On 17 July 1919, he was admitted in the Romanian Army with the rank of Locotenent-colonel (lieutenant colonel). For his tactical and commanding abilities displayed in the war, he was praised by Generals Hanzu, Mihăescu and Petala, and was decorated with the Officer's cross of the Order of the Star of Romania with swords and ribbon of military virtue. He was also promoted to the rank of Colonel in June 1920. Between 1921 and 1923, he commanded the 84th Infantry Regiment from Bistrița, then joined the general army headquarters and started teaching logistics at the Romanian War Academy in Bucharest. He attended the V Army Corps staff college in Brașov, and published a book titled Logistics: Basics of Organisation and Execution in 1926, which became the standard work on logistics for the Romanian Army. Ironically, after the book was published, Phleps failed his first general's examination on the topic of logistics. He commanded various Romanian units, including the 1st Brigade of the vânători de munte (mountain troops), while also serving as a military advisor to King Carol II in the 1930s. Phleps was promoted to General de brigadă (brigadier general) in 1933, and reached the rank of General de divizie (major general) in 1938, despite his reported disdain for the corruption, intrigue and hypocrisy of the royal court. After criticising the government's policy and publicly calling King Carol a liar when another general tried to twist his words, he was transferred to the reserves in 1940 and finally dismissed from service at his own request in 1941.

== World War II ==
=== SS Motorised Division Wiking ===
In November 1940, with the support of the leader of the Volksgruppe in Rumänien (ethnic Germans in Romania), Andreas Schmidt, Phleps had written to the key Waffen-SS recruiting officer SS-Brigadeführer und Generalmajor der Waffen SS (brigadier) Gottlob Berger offering his services to the Third Reich. He subsequently asked for permission to leave Romania to join the Wehrmacht, and this was approved by the recently installed Romanian Conducător (leader), the dictator General Ion Antonescu. Phleps volunteered for the Waffen-SS instead, enlisting under his mother's maiden name of Stolz. According to the historian Hans Bergel, Phleps joined the Waffen-SS because Volksdeutsche were not permitted to join the Wehrmacht. He was appointed an SS-Standartenführer (colonel) by Reichsführer-SS Heinrich Himmler and joined the SS Motorised Division Wiking, where he commanded Dutch, Flemish, Danish, Norwegian, Swedish and Finnish volunteers. When Hilmar Wäckerle, the commander of SS-Regiment Westland, was killed in action near Lvov in late June 1941, Phleps took over command of that regiment. He distinguished himself in fighting at Kremenchuk and Dnipropetrovsk in Ukraine, commanded his own Kampfgruppe, became a confidant of Generalmajor (brigadier) Hans-Valentin Hube, commander of the 16th Panzer Division, and was subsequently promoted to SS-Oberführer (senior colonel). In July 1941 he was awarded the 1939 clasp to his Iron Cross (1914) 2nd Class and then the Iron Cross (1939) 1st Class.

=== 7th SS Volunteer Mountain Division Prinz Eugen ===
On 30 December 1941, Generalfeldmarschall (field marshal) Wilhelm Keitel advised Himmler that Adolf Hitler had authorised the raising of a seventh Waffen-SS division from the Volksdeutsche (ethnic Germans) of Yugoslavia. In the meantime, Phleps reverted to his birth name from his mother's maiden name. Two weeks later, SS-Brigadeführer und Generalmajor der Waffen SS Phleps was selected to organise the new division. On 1 March 1942, the division was officially designated the SS-Freiwilligen-Division "Prinz Eugen". Phleps was promoted to SS-Gruppenführer und Generalleutnant der Waffen SS (major general) on 20 April 1942. After recruitment, formation and training in the Banat region in October 1942, the two regiments and supporting arms were deployed into the southwestern part of the German-occupied territory of Serbia as an anti-partisan force. Headquartered in Kraljevo, with its two mountain infantry regiments centred on Užice and Raška, the division continued its training. Some artillery batteries, the anti-aircraft battalion, the motorcycle battalion and cavalry squadron continued to form in the Banat. During his time with the 7th SS Division, Phleps was referred to as "Papa Phleps" by his troops.

From left: Italian General Ercole Roncaglia, Kurt Waldheim, Oberst Macholz and Phleps (with briefcase) at Podgorica airfield in Montenegro during Operation Schwarz, 22 May 1943. This photograph caused much controversy when it was published while Waldheim was running for the Austrian presidency in 1985–1986.

In early October 1942, the division commenced Operation Kopaonik, targeting the Chetnik force of Major Dragutin Keserović in the Kopaonik Mountains. The operation ended with little success, since the Chetniks had forewarning of the operation and were able to avoid contact. After a quiet winter, in January 1943 Phleps deployed the division to the Independent State of Croatia (NDH) to participate in Operation Weiss. Between 13 February and 9 March 1943 he was responsible for the initial aspects of raising the 13th Waffen Mountain Division of the SS Handschar (1st Croatian) in the NDH in addition to his duties commanding the 7th SS Division. In his strongly apologetic history of the division which he later commanded, Otto Kumm claims that the 7th SS Division captured Bihać and Bosanski Petrovac, killed over 2,000 partisans and captured nearly 400 during Operation Weiss. After a short rest and refit in April, the division was committed to Operation Schwarz in May and June 1943, during which it advanced from the Mostar area into the Italian governorate of Montenegro killing, according to Kumm, 250 partisans and capturing over 500. The historian Thomas Casagrande notes that all German units fighting partisans routinely counted the uninvolved civilians they murdered as partisans, so that the reported number of inflicted casualties is likely to have included many civilians. The division played a decisive role during the fighting. Although Himmler had already planned to award Phleps the Knight's Cross of the Iron Cross for his role in organising the 7th SS Division, it was for the achievements of his division during Operation Schwarz that Phleps received the award. Phleps was also portrayed in the SS-magazine Das Schwarze Korps. He was awarded the Knight's Cross in July 1943, and was promoted to Obergruppenführer und General der Waffen-SS (lieutenant general), and placed in command of the V SS Mountain Corps.

In May 1943, Phleps became frustrated by the failure of his Italian allies to cooperate with German operations, which was demonstrated in his reputation for forthright speech. During a meeting with his Italian counterpart in Podgorica, Montenegro, Phleps called the Italian corps commander General Ercole Roncaglia a "lazy macaroni". Phleps scolded his Wehrmacht interpreter, Leutnant Kurt Waldheim for toning down his language, saying "Listen Waldheim, I know some Italian and you are not translating what I am telling this so-and-so". On another occasion, he threatened to shoot Italian sentries who were delaying his passage through a checkpoint. On 15 May 1943, Phleps handed over command of the division to SS-Brigadeführer und Generalmajor der Waffen SS Karl von Oberkamp.

While under Phleps's command, the division committed many crimes against the civilian population of the NDH, especially during operations Weiss and Schwarz. These included "burning villages, massacre of inhabitants, torture and murder of captured partisans", earning the division a distinctive reputation for cruelty. These charges have been denied by Kumm, among others. Still, the divisional orders routinely called for the annihilation of hostile civilian population, and Waffen-SS documents show that these orders were regularly carried out. For example, Himmler's police representative in the NDH, SS-Brigadeführer und Generalmajor der Polizei Konstantin Kammerhofer, reported on 15 July 1943 that units of the 7th SS Division had shot the Muslim population of Kosutica, about 40 men, women, and children gathered in a "church". The division claimed that "bandits" in the village had opened fire, but the police could not discover any traces of combat. Such incidents, which jeopardized the plan to raise a Muslim SS division, led to a dispute between Kammerhofer and Phleps's successor Oberkamp. Himmler ordered Phleps to intervene, and he reported on 7 September 1943 that he could not discover anything wrong with the shootings in Kosutica and that Kammerhofer and Oberkamp had resolved their dispute. The war crimes committed by the 7th SS Division became the subject of international controversy when Waldheim's service in the Balkans became public in the mid-1980s, during his successful bid for the Austrian presidency.

=== V SS Mountain Corps ===
The formations under the command of V SS Mountain Corps varied during Phlep's command. In July 1944, it consisted of the 118th Jäger Division and 369th (Croatian) Infantry Division in addition to the 7th SS and 13th SS divisions. Throughout Phlep's command, the corps was under the overall control of 2nd Panzer Army, and conducted anti-partisan operations throughout the NDH and Montenegro. These operations included Operations "Kugelblitz" (ball lightning) and "Schneesturm" (blizzard), which were part of a major offensive in eastern Bosnia in December 1943, but they were only a limited success. Phleps had met personally with Hitler to discuss the planning for Operation "Kugelblitz".

Due to the unreliable nature of the troops loyal to the NDH government, Phleps utilised Chetnik forces as auxiliaries, stating to a visiting officer that he could not disarm the Chetniks unless the NDH government provided him with the same strength in reliable troops. In January 1944, due to fears that the Western Allies would invade along the Dalmatian coastline and islands, V SS Mountain Corps forced the mass evacuation of male civilians between the ages of 17 and 50 from that area. Phleps was criticised by both NDH and German authorities for the harshness with which the evacuation was carried out. During the first six months of 1944, elements of the V SS Mountain Corps were involved in Operation "Waldrausch" (Forest Fever) in central Bosnia, Operation "Maibaum" (Maypole) in eastern Bosnia, and Operation "Rösselsprung" (Knight's Move), the attempt to capture or kill the partisan leader Josip Broz Tito.

On 20 June 1944, Phleps was awarded the German Cross in gold. In September, he was appointed plenipotentiary general of German occupation troops in South Transylvania and the Banat, organising the flight of the Volksdeutsche of North Transylvania ahead of the advancing Soviet Red Army.

== Death and aftermath ==
Following the Romanian coup d'état of 23 August 1944 which deposed Antonescu, Phleps and his entourage were en route to a meeting with Himmler in Berlin. He made a detour to reconnoitre the situation near Arad, Romania, after receiving reports of Soviet advances in that area. Accompanied only by his adjutant and his driver, and unaware of the presence of Red Army units in the vicinity, he entered Șimand, a village approximately 20 kilometres (12 mi) north of Arad, on the afternoon of 21 September 1944. Soviet forces were already in the village, and Phleps and his men were captured and brought in for interrogation. When the building in which they were held was attacked by German aircraft later that afternoon, the prisoners tried to escape and were shot by their guards. Bergel suspects that Phleps had been set up by Hungarian army officers who had found out that he knew of plans for Hungary to switch sides as Romania had done shortly before. Phleps's personal effects, including his identity card, tags and decorations, were found by a Hungarian patrol and handed over to German authorities on 29 September 1944. Phleps had been listed as missing in action since 22 September 1944 when he did not show up for his meeting with Himmler, who issued a warrant for his arrest on suspicion of treason.

Phleps was posthumously awarded the Oak Leaves to his Knight's Cross on 24 November 1944, which was presented to his son, SS-Obersturmführer (first lieutenant) Dr.med. Reinhart Phleps, a battalion doctor serving in the 7th SS Division. Soon after his death, the 13th Gebirgsjäger Regiment of the 7th SS Division was given the cuff title Artur Phleps in his honour.

== Accusations of war crimes ==
Phleps was accused by the Yugoslav authorities of war crimes in association with the atrocities committed by 7th SS Division in the area of Nikšić in Montenegro during Operation Schwarz, while under his command. At the Nuremberg trials on 6 August 1946, a document from the Yugoslav State Commission for Crimes of Occupiers and their Collaborators regarding the crimes of the 7th SS Division was quoted as follows:

At the end of May 1943 the division came to Montenegro to the area of Niksic in order to take part in the fifth enemy offensive in conjunction with the Italian troops. [...] The officers and men of the SS division Prinz Eugen committed crimes of an outrageous cruelty on this occasion. The victims were shot, slaughtered and tortured, or burnt to death in burning houses. [...] It has been established from the investigations entered upon that 121 persons, mostly women, and including 30 persons aged 60–92 years and 29 children of ages ranging from 6 months to 14 years, were executed on this occasion in the horrible manner narrated above. The villages [and then follows the list of the villages] were burnt down and razed to the ground. [...] For all of these most serious War Crimes those responsible besides the actual culprits—the members of the SS Division Prinz Eugen—are all superior and all subordinate commanders as the persons issuing and transmitting the orders for murder and devastation. Among others the following war criminals are known: SS Gruppenfuehrer and Lieutenant General of the Waffen-SS Phleps; Divisional Commander, Major General of the Waffen-SS Karl von Oberkamp; Commander of the 13th Regiment, later Divisional Commander, Major General Gerhard Schmidhuber...

The post-war Nuremberg trials made the declaratory judgement that the Waffen-SS was a criminal organisation due to its major involvement in war crimes and crimes against humanity, including the killing of prisoners of war and atrocities committed in occupied countries.

== Awards ==
Phleps received the following awards during his service:

- Austrian Military Merit Medal (Signum Laudis)
  - in Bronze with war decoration and swords on 13 October 1914
  - in Silver with war decoration on 15 March 1916
- Austrian Military Merit Cross 3rd Class with war decoration and swords on 3 July 1915
- Decoration for Services to the Red Cross 2nd Class with war decoration on 23 October 1915
- Prussian Iron Cross (1914) 2nd Class on 27 January 1917
- Austrian Order of the Iron Crown 3rd Class with war decoration and swords on 24 April 1917
- Officer's cross of the Order of Franz Joseph with war decoration and swords on 23 July 1918
- Order of the Star of Romania
  - Officer's cross with swords on ribbon of military merit on 12 March 1920
  - Commander's cross on 28 February 1933
- Czechoslovak War Cross on 1 March 1928
- Order of the Yugoslav Crown 2nd Class in 1933
- Bulgarian Order of Military Merit 2nd Class on 26 April 1934
- Romanian Order of the Crown
  - Commander on 1 January 1927
  - Grand Cross on 10 May 1939
- Clasp to the Iron Cross (1939) 2nd Class on 10 July 1941
- Iron Cross 1st Class on 26 July 1941
- Infantry Assault Badge in Bronze on 7 November 1943
- German Cross in Gold on 20 June 1944 as SS-Obergruppenführer und General der Waffen-SS in the V SS Mountain Corps
- Knight's Cross of the Iron Cross with Oak Leaves
  - Knight's Cross on 4 July 1943 as SS-Brigadeführer und Generalmajor der Waffen SS and commander of SS-Division "Prinz Eugen" (Note: According to Scherzer as commander of SS-Volunteer-Mountain-Division "Prinz Eugen".)
  - 670th Oak Leaves on 24 November 1944 (posthumously) as SS-Obergruppenführer und General der Waffen-SS, commanding general of the V SS Mountain Corps and higher SS and police leader as well as commander-in-chief in Siebenbürgen.

== Personal life ==
Phleps was married; his wife's name was Grete. They had a son, Reinhart, and a daughter, Irmingard. One of Phleps's brothers became a doctor, and the other was a professor at the Danzig technical university, now Gdańsk University of Technology.

== Notes ==
Military offices
Preceded by New formation	Commander of 7th SS Volunteer Mountain Division Prinz Eugen; 30 January 1942 – 15 May 1943	Succeeded by SS-Brigadeführer Karl Reichsritter von Oberkamp
Preceded by New formation	Commander of V SS Mountain Corps; 8 July 1943 – 21 September 1944	Succeeded by SS-Brigadeführer Karl Reichsritter von Oberkamp
