= 80th Regiment "Roma" =

Active Italian Army infantry unit

- 80° Reggimento "Roma"
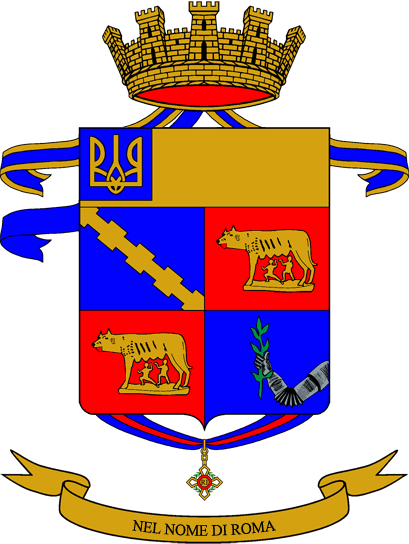
- Regimental coat of arms
- Active: 1 Nov. 1884 – 31 Oct 1926; 2 May 1937 – 8 Sept. 1943; 1 July 1958 – today
- Country: Italy
- Branch: Italian Army
- Part of: Non-Commissioned Officers School
- Garrison/HQ: Cassino
- Motto: "Nel nome di Roma"
- Anniversaries: 12 November 1941 – Battle of Mykytivka
- Decorations: 1× Military Order of Italy; 2× Gold Medals of Military Valor; 1× Bronze Medal of Military Valor

Insignia
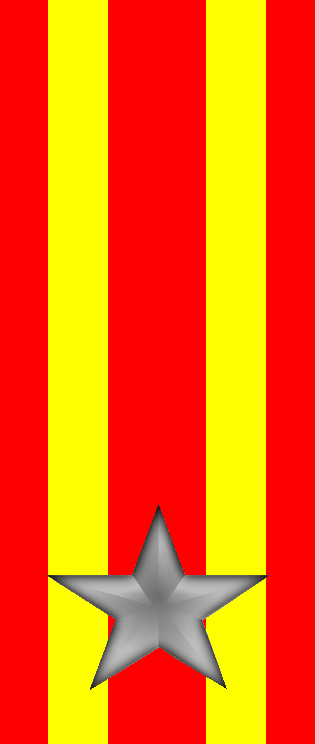
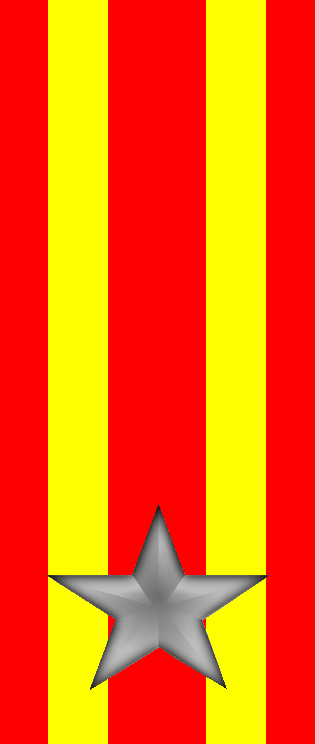
- Regimental gorget patches

The 80th Regiment "Roma" (Italian: 80° Reggimento "Roma") is an active unit of the Italian Army based in Monte Romano in Lazio. The regiment is named for the city of Rome and was part of the Italian Army's infantry arm until 2004, when it became a training unit and was redesignated as a "multi-arms unit" and designated 80th Volunteer Training Regiment "Roma". In December 2023 the regiment became a training support unit at the Monte Romano training range with the new name 80th Regiment "Roma".

The regiment was one of sixteen infantry regiments formed on 1 November 1884. During World War I the regiment fought on the Italian front. The regiment was disbanded in 1926 and reformed in May 1937. During World War II the regiment was assigned to the 9th Infantry Division "Pasubio", with which it participated in the invasion of Yugoslavia. In July 1941 the Pasubio division was assigned to the Italian Expeditionary Corps in Russia and the regiment fought in Donbas in Ukraine and along the Don river in southern Russia. In December 1942 the division and regiment were destroyed during the Soviet Operation Little Saturn. For its conduct in Ukraine and Russia the regiment was awarded two times Italy's highest military honor the Gold Medal of Military Valor. In 1958 the regiment was reformed as a training unit, which was reduced to a battalion sized unit at the end of 1975. In 1992 the regiment was reformed and was active as the training unit of the Non-Commissioned Officers School until 2023.

== History ==
=== Formation ===
On 1 November 1884 the 80th Infantry Regiment (Brigade "Roma") was formed in Rome with companies ceded by the 6th Infantry Regiment (Brigade "Aosta"), 8th Infantry Regiment (Brigade "Cuneo"), 38th Infantry Regiment (Brigade "Ravenna"), 44th Infantry Regiment (Brigade "Forlì"), and 74th Infantry Regiment (Brigade "Lombardia"). On the same day the 79th Infantry Regiment (Brigade "Roma") was formed in Rome with companies ceded by the 5th Infantry Regiment (Brigade "Aosta"), 7th Infantry Regiment (Brigade "Cuneo"), 37th Infantry Regiment (Brigade "Ravenna"), 43rd Infantry Regiment (Brigade "Forlì"), and 73rd Infantry Regiment (Brigade "Lombardia"). Both regiments consisted of a staff and three battalions, with four companies per battalion. Together the two regiments formed the Brigade "Rome".

In 1895–96 the regiment provided three officers and 118 enlisted for units deployed to Italian Eritrea for the First Italo-Ethiopian War. In 1911–12 the regiment provided 17 officers and 1,452 enlisted to augment units fighting in the Italo-Turkish War.

=== World War I ===
At the outbreak of World War I, the Brigade "Roma" formed, together with the Brigade "Puglie" and the 29th Field Artillery Regiment, the 9th Division. At the time the 72nd Infantry Regiment consisted of three battalions, each of which fielded four fusilier companies and one machine gun section. After Italy's entry into the war on 23 May 1915 the Brigade "Roma" was deployed to the Italian front: in 1915 the regiment operated against Austro-Hungarian forces in the Vallarsa valley. In May 1916 the regiment fought in the Battle of Asiago in the area of Trambileno. In June and July of the same year the regiment fought for control of the Corno di Coston. On 24 May 1916 the regimental depot of the 80th Infantry Regiment in Verona formed the command of the Brigade "Rovigo" and the 227th Infantry Regiment (Brigade "Rovigo"). In 1917 the regiment operated in the Val Posina until it was transferred in July to the Banjšice plateau where the regiment fought in August 1917 in the Eleventh Battle of the Isonzo in the area of Kal nad Kanalom. In October 1917 the regiment fought in the Battle of Caporetto. In June 1918 the Brigade "Roma" fought in the Second Battle of the Piave River at Monastier and in October the brigade was deployed on Monte Grappa, where it fought in the decisive Battle of Vittorio Veneto. For their conduct on the Piave river and on Monte Grappa the two regiments of the Brigade "Roma" were both awarded a Bronze Medal of Military Valor.

=== Interwar years ===
On 31 October 1926 the 80th Infantry Regiment was disbanded and its two battalions transferred to the 231st Infantry Regiment "Avellino" and 232nd Infantry Regiment "Avellino". On 20 December of the same year the 79th Infantry Regiment was renamed 79th Infantry Regiment "Roma", while the Brigade "Roma" was renamed IX Infantry Brigade and assigned to the 9th Territorial Division of Verona. The IX Infantry Brigade also included the 49th Infantry Regiment "Parma" and 57th Infantry Regiment "Abruzzi".

On 1 November 1936 the 66th Infantry Regiment "Valtellina" was transferred from the 16th Infantry Division "Fossalta" to the 8th Infantry Division "Po" and moved from Reggio Emilia to Parma. On 2 May 1937 the "Fossalta" division reformed the 80th Infantry Regiment "Roma" in Reggio Emilia as replacement for the 66th "Valtellina". In 1938 the regiment moved from Reggio Emilia to Mantua. In April 1939 the 80th Infantry Regiment "Roma" was transferred to the 9th Infantry Division "Pasubio", which also included the 79th Infantry Regiment "Roma" and the 8th Artillery Regiment "Pasubio". When the 80th Infantry Regiment "Roma" entered the Pasubio division both infantry regiments were renamed as 79th Infantry Regiment "Pasubio" respectively 80th Infantry Regiment "Pasubio".

=== World War II ===
At the outbreak of World War II the regiment consisted of a command, a command company, three fusilier battalions, a support weapons battery equipped with 65/17 infantry support guns, and a mortar company equipped with 81mm Mod. 35 mortars. On 6 April 1941 the Pasubio division participated in the invasion of Yugoslavia.

In July 1941 the division was assigned to the Italian Expeditionary Corps in Russia and left Verona on 10 July 1941 for Ukraine. In fall of 1941 the division fought in Eastern Ukraine, where it captured Horlivka near Donetsk. For the capture of Horlivka and the Battle of Mykytivka the 80th Infantry Regiment "Pasubio" was awarded a Gold Medal of Military Valor.

On 10 December 1941 the regimental depot of the 80th Infantry Regiment "Pasubio" in Mantua formed the 114th Infantry Regiment "Mantova" for the 104th Infantry Division "Mantova". In 1942 the division was assigned to the Italian Army in Russia/8th Army, which suffered heavy losses on the Don river during the Soviet Operation Little Saturn in December 1942 and the Ostrogozhsk–Rossosh offensive, which began on 13 Januar 1943. By February 1943 the 8th Army had been destroyed. For their sacrifice on the Don river the 79th Infantry Regiment "Pasubio" and 80th Infantry Regiment "Pasubio" were both awarded a Gold Medal of Military Valor.

In April 1943 the survivors of the division returned to Italy, where the division was rebuilt. At the end of June 1943 the Pasubio division was sent to Campania, where the division was disbanded by invading German forces after the announcement of the Armistice of Cassibile on 8 September 1943.

=== Cold War ===
On 1 July 1958, the 80th Infantry Regiment "Roma" was reformed by renaming the existing 8th Recruits Training Center in Orvieto. The regiment consisted of the following units.

- 80th Infantry Regiment "Roma", in Orvieto
  - Command and Services Company, in Orvieto
  - I Battalion, in Sora
  - II Battalion, in Orvieto
  - III Battalion, in Cassino

During the 1975 army reform the Italian Army disbanded the regimental level and newly independent battalions were granted for the first time their own flags. On 31 December 1975, the 80th Infantry Regiment "Roma" was disbanded and the next day the regiment's III Battalion in Cassino was renamed 80th Infantry Battalion "Roma" and assigned the flag and traditions of the 80th Infantry Regiment "Roma". On the same day the regiment's I Battalion in Sora was renamed 57th Motorized Infantry Battalion "Abruzzi" and the regiment's II Battalion in Orvieto was renamed 3rd Grenadiers Battalion "Guardie". The battalion was assigned to the Central Military Region and consisted of a command, a command platoon, and three recruits training companies.

=== Recent times ===
On 22 March 1991 the battalion was transferred to the Non-Commissioned Officers School. On 24 September 1992 the 80th Infantry Battalion "Roma" lost its autonomy and the next day the battalion entered the reformed 80th Regiment "Roma", which continued the training duties of the battalion. In 2004 the regiment was renamed 80th Volunteer Training Regiment "Roma". In December 2023 the regiment became a training support unit based in Monte Romano with the new name 80th Regiment "Roma".

== Organization ==
As of 2023 the 80th Regiment "Roma" is organized as follows:

- 80th Regiment "Roma", in Monte Romano
  - Command and Services Company
  - Support Company
