= Battle of Rhodes (1912) =

1912 battle in the Italo-Turkish War

- Part of the Italo-Turkish War
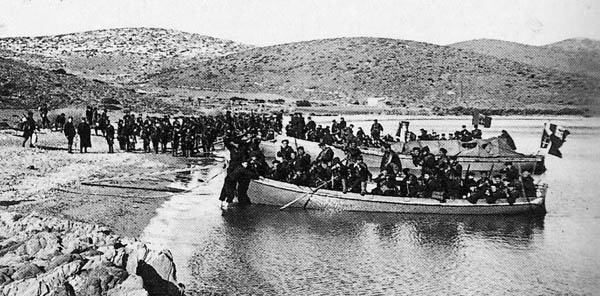
- Italian troops landing at Rhodes on 4 May 1912.
Date	4–16 May 1912
Location	Rhodes, Ottoman Empire 36.3730°N 27.2180°E
Result	Italian victory

Belligerents
Kingdom of Italy	Ottoman Empire

Commanders and leaders
Giovanni Ameglio	Major Abdullah Bey (surrendered)

Strength
9,000–10,400	~1,800 men garrison 10,000 local militia

Casualties and losses
4 killed 20 wounded	~83 killed ~26 wounded 983 captured, 144 rifles 200 cases of ammunition
- An Italian fleet participated in the battle.

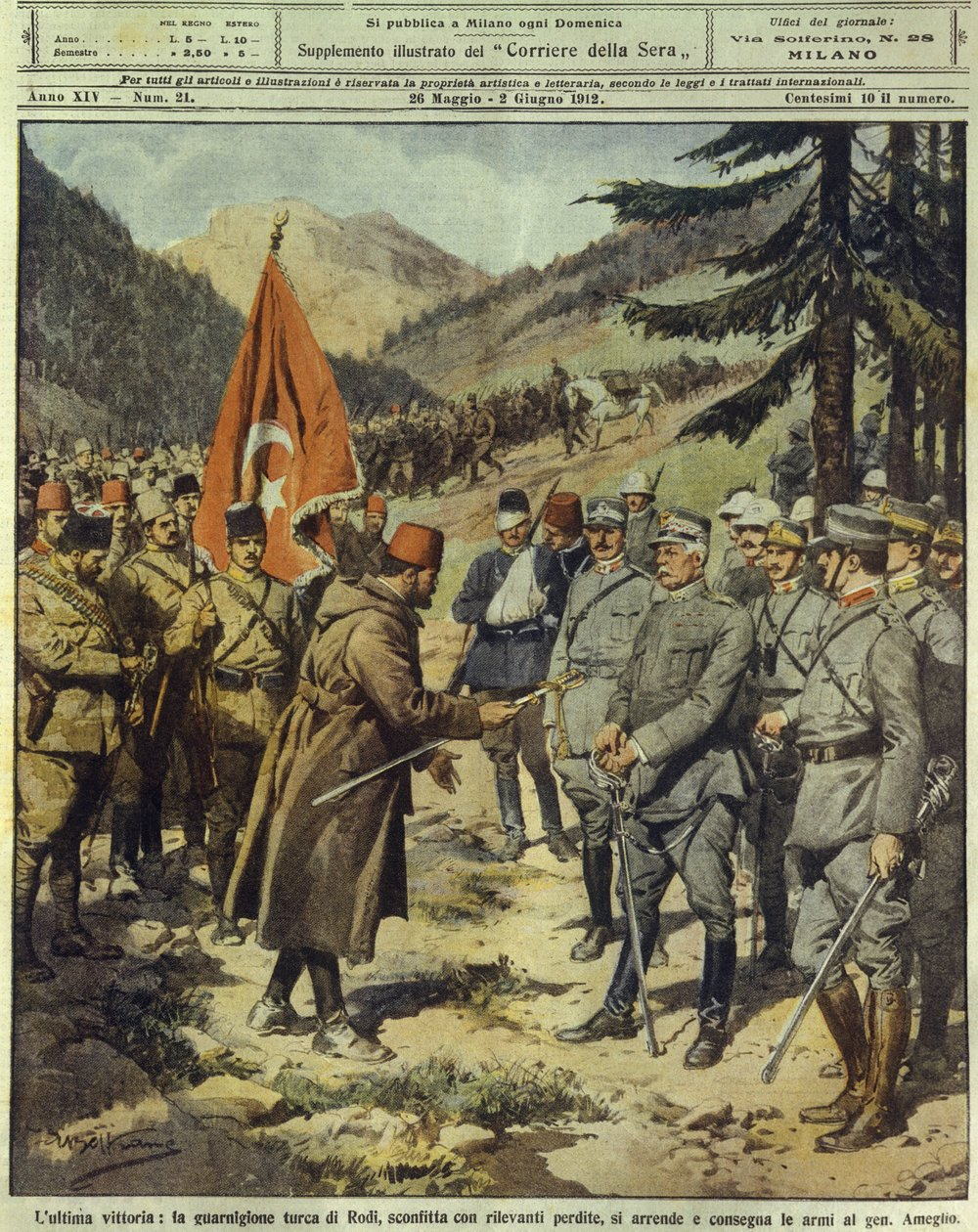
16 May 1912: surrender of the Turkish garrison in Rhodes to the Italian general Ameglio near Psithos

The Battle of Rhodes or Invasion of Rhodes was fought in May 1912 as part of the Italo-Turkish War. Italian troops under Lieutenant General Giovanni Ameglio landed on the Turkish-held island and took control after 13 days of fighting, ending nearly 400 years of Ottoman rule. The battle became the major engagement during the Italian operations in the Aegean Sea.

Italian forces numbered about 9,000 to 10,400 men supported by a fleet of Regia Marina ("Royal Navy") warships. Many of the Italian troops were veterans of the campaigns in Ottoman Libya, having been shipped from Benghazi and Tobruk. The Regia Marina began operating off the island a few days prior to the invasion. On 1 May, the Regia Marina cut the communications cable linking Rhodes with the Anatolian mainland. The Italian landing forces consisted of the 4th Bersaglieri Regiment, the 34th Infantry Regiment (Brigade "Livorno"), the 57th Infantry Regiment (Brigade "Abruzzi"), the Alpini Battalion "Fenestrelle" of the 3rd Alpini Regiment, four artillery batteries, and various support units. An unopposed landing in Kalithea Bay began at 4:00 am on 4 May and lasted until 2:00 pm when the Italians began their march north towards the city of Rhodes. Ottoman Army personnel numbered about 1,000 officers and men with a handful of old artillery pieces, although another 10,000 militiamen were recruited from the local Muslim civilian population. At first the Italians overestimated the Ottoman garrison on the island at 2,000 to 5,000 and therefore they waited until they gathered enough men for the attack. Rhodes was protected by a castle but the Turks did not use it and it played no part in the battle.

The first line of Turkish defenses was at Smith Plateau, where a few hundred men were stationed. Italian troops attacked the position, while 11 Italian ships bombarded the area. The Turks were routed with significant losses, while the Italians reported that only seven of their men were wounded. Ottoman forces retreated that night to the mountains around Psithos and the Italians advanced to within 2 kilometers (1.2 mi) of Rhodes and stopped at 7:00 pm. When the city surrendered the following morning at 10:00 am, Italian troops marched in without opposition.

Meanwhile, additional unopposed landings took place at Kalavarda and Malona Bay, both about 30 miles (48 km) south of Rhodes. On May 7, the Wali of Rhodes was captured with over 100 Turkish officials by the Italian destroyer Ostro. The Turks were trying to flee the islands, but instead ended up going to Taranto on 11 May as prisoners of war.

Lieutenant General Ameglio took the offensive again on 15 May against the Ottoman forces around Psithos. With the landings at Kalavarda and Malona Bay completed, Ameglio and his main force were able to surround the Turkish position on three sides while the battleship Ammiraglio di Saint Bon bombarded troop concentrations from the fourth. After a nine-hour battle the Ottomans were defeated and the battle for Rhodes came to an end when the Turkish commanders surrendered the next day on 16 May. Eighty-three Turks were killed at Psithos, 26 were wounded and 983 surrendered. The remaining 10,000 militiamen returned to their homes. Four Italians were reported to have been killed in the final engagement and 26 men were wounded. After 390 years of Muslim rule, Rhodes was once again controlled by Christian forces.
