= Olmi =

Olmi may refer to:

== People ==
- Corrado Olmi (1926–2020), Italian actor and comedian
- Ermanno Olmi (1931–2018), Italian film director
- Monica Olmi (born 1970), Italian swimmer
- Renato Olmi (1914–1985), Italian footballer
- Roberto Olmi (1890–1968), Italian general during World War II
- Véronique Olmi (born 1962), French playwright and novelist
- Vigilio Mario Olmi (1927–2019), Italian Roman Catholic bishop

== See also ==
- Olmi-Cappella, Haute-Corse, France
- Pieve d'Olmi, Cremona, Lombardy, Italy
