= 57th Infantry Regiment "Abruzzi" =

Active Italian Army infantry unit

- 57° Reggimento Fanteria "Abruzzi"
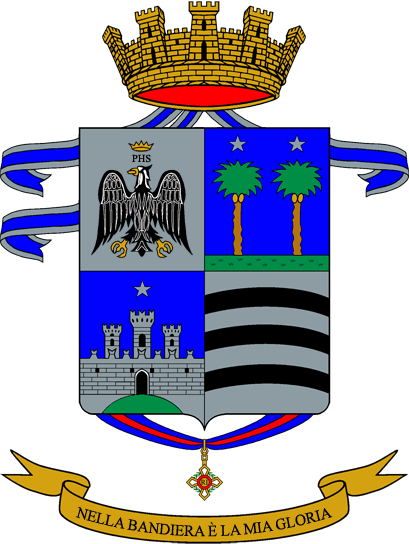
- Regimental coat of arms
- Active: 16 April 1861 – 23 Sept. 1943; 1 Jan. 1976 – 1 April 2013; 1 Oct. 2022 – today
- Country: Italy
- Branch: Italian Army
- Part of: Division "Acqui"
- Garrison/HQ: Capua
- Motto: "Nella bandiera è la mia gloria"
- Anniversaries: 8 August 1916 — Battle of Gorizia
- Decorations: 1× Military Order of Italy; 3× Silver Medals of Military Valor; 1× Croix de guerre avec Palme de bronze

Insignia
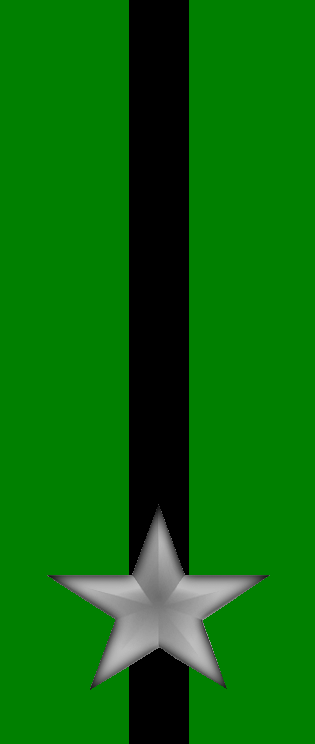
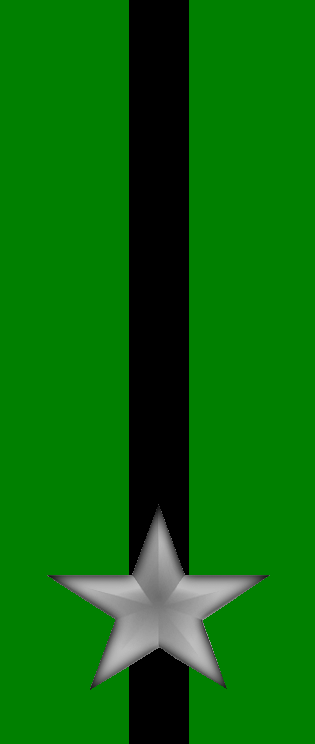
- Regimental gorget patches

The 57th Infantry Regiment "Abruzzi" (Italian: 57° Reggimento Fanteria "Abruzzi") is an active unit of the Italian Army based in Capua in Campania. The unit is named for the region of Abruzzo and part of the Italian Army's infantry arm. On 1 October 2022, the name, flag and traditions of the regiment were assigned to the Command and Tactical Supports Unit "Acqui" of the Division "Acqui". On the same day the unit was renamed 57th Command and Tactical Supports Unit "Abruzzi".

The regiment was one of ten infantry regiments formed by the Royal Italian Army on 16 April 1861. In 1866, the regiment participated in the Third Italian War of Independence and in 1870 in the capture of Rome. In 1911–12 the regiment fought in the Italo-Turkish War. During World War I, the regiment fought on the Italian front. During World War II, the regiment was assigned to the 10th Infantry Division "Piave", with which it fought in the Invasion of Yugoslavia. In 1943, the "Piave" division was tasked with the defense of Rome. After the announcement of the Armistice of Cassibile on 8 September 1943 the division briefly fought against invading German forces. On 10 September 1943, the division took on the task of maintaining public order in Rome, but 13 days later, on 23 September, the Germans disbanded the "Piave" division and its regiments.

In 1975, the unit was reformed as 57th Motorized Infantry Battalion "Abruzzi". The battalion was assigned to the Motorized Brigade "Acqui" and inherited the flag and traditions of the 57th Infantry Regiment "Abruzzi". In 1991, the battalion was reorganized as a recruits training battalion. In 2006, the battalion entered the 123rd Volunteer Training Regiment "Chieti". In 2012, the regiment was disbanded and the 57th Battalion "Abruzzi" was assigned to the Training Units Grouping. In 2013, the battalion was disbanded and the flag of the 57th Infantry Regiment "Abruzzi" transferred to the Shrine of the Flags in the Vittoriano in Rome. The regiment's anniversary falls on 8 August 1916, the height of the Battle of Gorizia, during which the regiment earned its third Silver Medal of Military Valor.

== History ==
=== Formation ===
On 16 April 1861, the Royal Italian Army formed the Brigade "Abruzzi" in Milan. The brigade consisted of the 57th Infantry Regiment and 58th Infantry Regiment, which were formed on the same day and based in Milan, respectively in Bergamo. The 57th Infantry Regiment received three battalions ceded by the 7th Infantry Regiment and 8th Infantry Regiment of the Brigade "Cuneo", and by the 51st Infantry Regiment of the Brigade "Alpi", while the 58th Infantry Regiment received three battalions ceded by the 13th Infantry Regiment and 14th Infantry Regiment of the Brigade "Pinerolo", and by the 19th Infantry Regiment of the Brigade "Brescia".

On 1 August 1862, the regiment ceded its 17th Company and 18th Company to help form the 72nd Infantry Regiment (Brigade "Puglie"), and one additional company to help form the 8th Grenadiers Regiment of the Grenadiers of Tuscany Brigade. In 1866, the regiment fought in the Third Italian War of Independence. In September 1870, the regiment participated in the capture of Rome.

On 25 October 1871, the brigade level was abolished, and the two regiments of the Brigade "Abruzzi" were renamed 57th Infantry Regiment "Abruzzi", respectively 58th Infantry Regiment "Abruzzi". On 2 January 1881, the brigade level was reintroduced, and the two regiments were renamed again as 57th Infantry Regiment (Brigade "Abruzzi") and 58th Infantry Regiment (Brigade "Abruzzi"). On 1 November 1884, the regiment ceded some of its companies to help form the 81st Infantry Regiment (Brigade "Torino") in Turin. In 1895–96, the regiment provided two officers and 94 enlisted for units deployed to Italian Eritrea for the First Italo-Ethiopian War.

=== Italo-Turkish War ===
In 1911, the 57th Infantry Regiment was deployed to Libya for the Italo-Turkish War. On 12 March 1912, the regiment fought in the Battle of Due Palme and earned a Silver Medal of Military Valor, which was affixed to the regiment's flag. In May 1912, the regiment participated in the occupation of Rhodes in the Aegean Sea. On 18 June 1913, the regiment fought in the Battle of Ettangi, during which the regiment's I Battalion and III Battalion distinguished themselves. For this the regiment was awarded its second Silver Medal of Military Valor, which was also affixed to the regiment's flag.

=== World War I ===
At the outbreak of World War I, the Brigade "Abruzzi" formed, together with the Brigade "Marche" and the 20th Field Artillery Regiment, the 15th Division. At the time the 57th Infantry Regiment consisted of three battalions, each of which fielded four fusilier companies and one machine gun section. On 1 March 1915, the 57th Infantry Regiment's depot in Padua provided personnel to help form the brigade command of the Brigade "Padova", while the 58th Infantry Regiment's depot in Padua formed the 117th Infantry Regiment for the new brigade. After Italy's entry into the war on 23 May 1915, the Brigade "Abruzzi" was deployed in the Cismon Valley on the Italian front. The brigade remained in the area until January 1916, when it was transferred to the Isonzo front.

On 15 May 1916, the 57th Infantry Regiment's depot in Padua formed the 228th Infantry Regiment for the newly formed Brigade "Rovigo". In August 1916, the brigade fought in the Battle of Gorizia, during which the 57th Infantry Regiment suffered 2,088 casualties at Oslavia. In May 1917, the brigade fought in the Tenth Battle of the Isonzo. On 14 August 1917, the President of France Raymond Poincaré visited the Italian front and the Brigade "Umbria" paraded before him. After the parade Poincaré personally affixed the French Croix de guerre avec Palme de bronze to the flags of the 57th Infantry Regiment and the 58th Infantry Regiment.

On 18 August 1917, the brigade fought in the Eleventh Battle of the Isonzo on the Banjšice plateau. After the disastrous Battle of Caporetto the brigade retreated to the new frontline along the Piave river. On 5 December 1917, the Brigade "Abruzzi" entered the frontline on the Monte Grappa massif. The rest of the month the brigade fought in the First Battle of Monte Grappa on Col della Berretta. In 1918, the brigade remained on the Monte Grappa and fought in there in the Second Battle of Monte Grappa and Third Battle of Monte Grappa.

For its conduct during the Battle of Gorizia the 57th Infantry Regiment was awarded its third Silver Medal of Military Valor, which was affixed to the regiment's flag and added to the regiment's coat of arms.

=== Interwar years ===
In 1920 the 57th Infantry Regiment moved from Padua to Treviso and then Vicenza. On 31 December 1926, the Brigade "Abruzzi" was disbanded and its two regiments were transferred to the other brigades: the 57th Infantry Regiment "Abruzzi" to the IX Infantry Brigade, which was the infantry component of the 9th Territorial Division of Verona, and the 58th Infantry Regiment "Abruzzi" to the X Infantry Brigade, which was the infantry component of the 10th Territorial Division of Padua. The IX Infantry Brigade also included the 49th Infantry Regiment "Parma" and 79th Infantry Regiment "Roma", while the X Infantry Brigade included the 56th Infantry Regiment "Marche" and 71st Infantry Regiment "Puglie". The 9th Territorial Division of Verona also included the 8th Field Artillery Regiment and the 10th Territorial Division of Padua included the 20th Field Artillery Regiment.

On 1 January 1928, the X Infantry Brigade exchanged the 56th Infantry Regiment "Marche" for the 55th Infantry Regiment "Marche" of the XIII Infantry Brigade. In 1934 the 9th Territorial Division of Verona changed its name to 9th Infantry Division "Pasubio", while the 10th Territorial Division of Padua changed its name to 10th Infantry Division "Piave". A name change that also extended to the division's infantry brigade. In 1935, the 57th Infantry Regiment "Abruzzi" formed a Replacements Battalion, which was assigned to the 84th Infantry Regiment "Venezia" of the 19th Infantry Division "Gavinana", which was mobilized for the Second Italo-Ethiopian War. The regiment also contributed personnel for the XI Special Replacements Battalion, which was formed by the 49th Infantry Regiment "Parma", and provided a further nine officers and 181 troops for other units deployed to East Africa for the war.

On 22 February 1939, the 10th Infantry Division "Piave" transferred the 55th Infantry Regiment "Marche" to the newly formed 32nd Infantry Division "Marche". On 15 May 1939, the division transferred the 71st Infantry Regiment "Puglie" to the newly formed 38th Infantry Division "Puglie". On the same date the 9th Infantry Division "Pasubio" transferred the 57th Infantry Regiment "Abruzzi" to the 10th Infantry Division "Piave", which on the same date disbanded the X Infantry Brigade "Piave". The 10th Infantry Division "Piave" consisted now of the 57th Infantry Regiment "Abruzzi", 58th Infantry Regiment "Abruzzi", and 20th Artillery Regiment, all three of which changed their name to "Piave" on the same date.

=== World War II ===
At the outbreak of World War II, the 57th Infantry Regiment "Piave" consisted of a command, a command company, three fusilier battalions, a support weapons battery equipped with 65/17 infantry support guns, and a mortar company equipped with 81mm Mod. 35 mortars. On 10 June 1940, the "Piave" division was mobilized for war, but did not participated in the Invasion of France. In early February 1941, the division moved to Sicily, where it was assigned to the XII Army Corps. On 27 March 1941, the division was sent to the province of Udine on the Italian-Yugoslav border in preparation for the Invasion of Yugoslavia, which commenced on 6 April 1941. By 16 April 1941 the division had advanced to the Pivka area. Once hostilities ended the division was ordered to Liguria, where it arrived in May 1941. Between 21 June and 15 July 1941, the division was fully motorized. Consequently the division was renamed 10th Motorized Division "Piave", while the 57th Infantry Regiment "Piave" was renamed 57th Motorized Regiment "Piave".

On 5 January 1942, the depot of the 57th Infantry Regiment "Piave" in Vicenza formed the 227th Infantry Regiment "Rovigo" for the 105th Infantry Division "Rovigo". On 12 November 1942, the "Piave" division moved to the area between Saint-Tropez and Grimaud in Southern France as part of the Axis occupation of France. Between 1–10 January 1943, the division returned to Italy, where it was assigned to the Corpo d'Armata Motocorazzato, which was tasked with guarding the Southern approaches to Rome in case of an allied invasion. The division stayed in Velletri-Sezze-Priverno until August 1943, when the Italian focus shifted to prevent a possible German invasion. Therefore the division moved to the North of Rome to the area between the Via Cassia and Via Tiburtina.

On 8 September 1943, the Armistice of Cassibile was announced and the division received orders to move to Palombara Sabina, but was ambushed on the way by invading German forces at Ponte del Grillo, north of Monterotondo. The division counterattacked and forced the German forces to retreat to Monterotondo. After negotiations with the Germans, the "Piave" division was transferred on 10 September to the control of the municipal council of Rome, for which the division performed police duties in the city. The commands of the 57th Motorized Regiment "Piave" and 58th Motorized Regiment "Piave" were merged to form the Piave Division Battalions Group Command, while the personnel of the 57th Motorized Regiment "Piave" was used to form two battalions for the Group Command. On 23 September 1943, the Germans disbanded the group command and the battalions under its command.

=== Cold War ===
During the 1975 army reform the army disbanded the regimental level and newly independent battalions were granted for the first time their own flags. On 31 December 1975, the 80th Infantry Regiment "Roma" was disbanded and the next day the regiment's I Battalion in Sora became an autonomous unit and was renamed 57th Motorized Infantry Battalion "Abruzzi". The battalion was assigned to the Motorized Brigade "Acqui" and consisted of a command, a command and services company, three motorized companies, and a heavy mortar company equipped with towed 120mm Mod. 63 mortars. At the time the battalion fielded 844 men (41 officers, 94 non-commissioned officers, and 709 soldiers). On 12 November 1976, the President of the Italian Republic Giovanni Leone assigned with decree 846 the flag and traditions of the 57th Infantry Regiment "Abruzzi" to the 57th Motorized Infantry Battalion "Abruzzi".

=== Recent times ===
On 1 March 1991, the flag of the 57th Infantry Regiment "Abruzzi" left the base of the 57th Motorized Infantry Battalion "Abruzzi" in Sora. On the same day the battalion's companies and base were taken over by the 17th Motorized Infantry Battalion "San Martino", whose flag arrived on the same day in Sora. The next day, 2 March 1992, the 57th Infantry Battalion "Abruzzi" was reformed as recruits training battalion in Sulmona in the former base of the 17th Infantry Battalion "San Martino". On 1 June of the same year, the battalion was transferred from the Motorized Brigade "Acqui" to the Military Penitentiary Organization Command. The battalion consisted of a command, a command and services company, and two recruits companies. In 1992, the battalion was renamed 57th Battalion "Abruzzi".

On 1 April 2006, the battalion entered the 123rd Volunteer Training Regiment "Chieti". On 27 September 2012, the 123rd Volunteer Training Regiment "Chieti" was disbanded and the 57th Battalion "Abruzzi" was assigned to the Training Units Grouping. On 1 April 2013, the 57th Battalion "Abruzzi" was disbanded and the flag of the 57th Infantry Regiment "Abruzzi" transferred to the Shrine of the Flags in the Vittoriano in Rome.

=== Reactivation ===
On 1 October 2022, the flag and traditions of the 57th Infantry Regiment "Abruzzi" were assigned to the Command and Tactical Supports Unit "Acqui" of the Division "Acqui". On the same day the unit was renamed 57th Command and Tactical Supports Unit "Abruzzi".

== Organization ==
As of 2024 the unit is organized as follows:

- 57th Command and Tactical Supports Unit "Abruzzi", in Capua
  - Services Company
  - Logistic and Tactical Support Battalion
    - Deployment Support Company
    - Transport Company

== See also ==
- Division "Acqui"
