= 9th Infantry Division "Pasubio" =

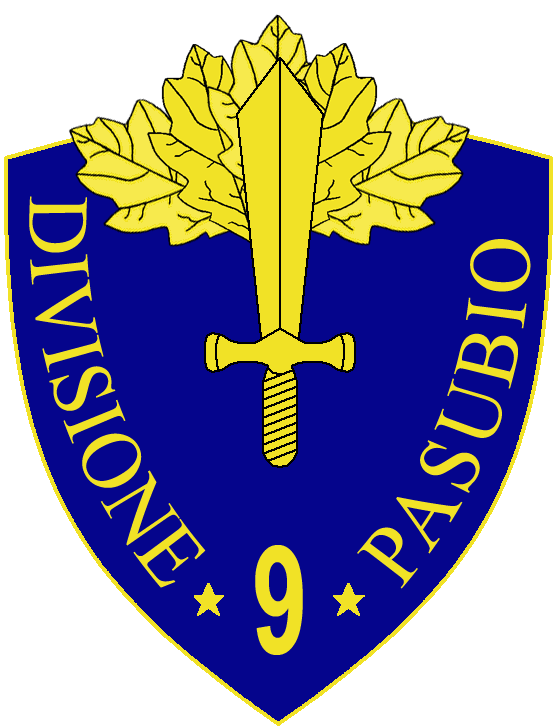
- 9th Infantry Division "Pasubio" insignia
- Active: 1934 – 8 September 1943
- Country: Kingdom of Italy
- Branch: Royal Italian Army
- Type: Infantry
- Size: Division
- Part of: Italian Expeditionary Corps in Russia; 8th Army
- Garrison/HQ: Verona
- Engagements: World War II: Invasion of Yugoslavia; Italian–Soviet War; Assault on Stalino; Capture of Gorlovka; Battle of Chazepetovka; Battle of Nikolayevka

Insignia
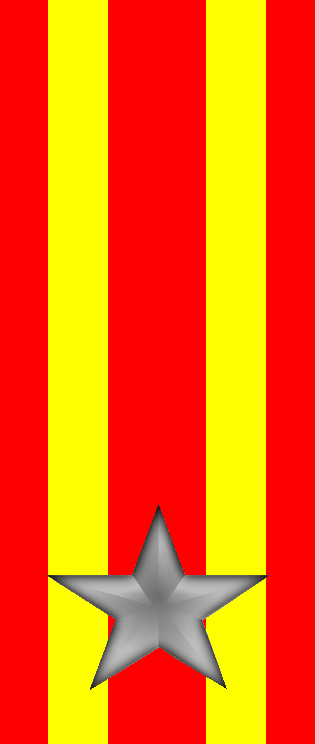
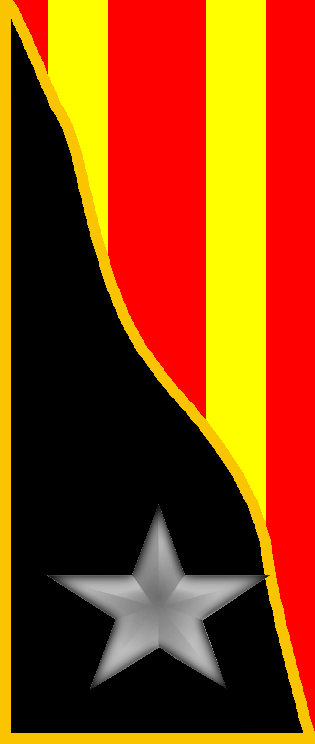
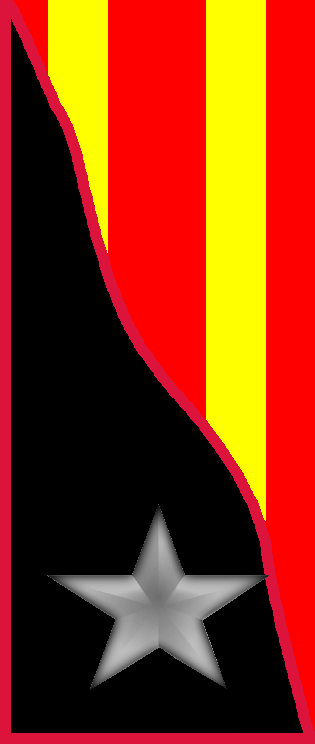
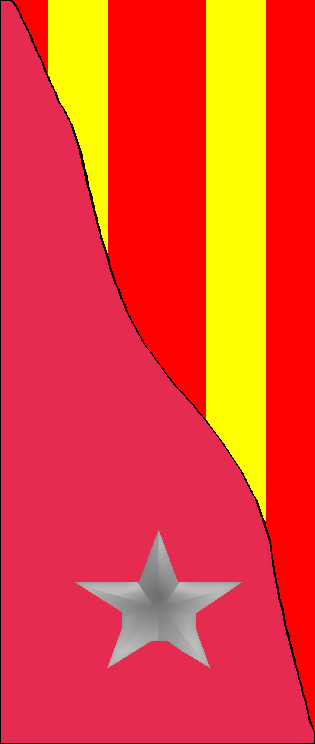
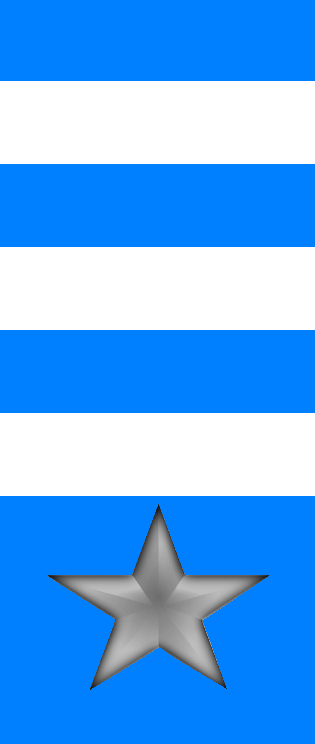
- Identification symbol: Pasubio Division gorget patches

The 9th Infantry Division Pasubio (Italian: 9ª Divisione di fanteria "Pasubio") was an infantry division of the Royal Italian Army during World War II. The Pasubio was classified as an auto-transportable division, meaning it had some motorized transport, but not enough to move the entire division at once. The division was formed as an infantry division in 1934, reorganized as auto-transportable division in 1939 and mobilized in August 1940. It was named for the battles on Pasubio during World War I. Its 79th Infantry Regiment and 8th Artillery Regiment were made up of men from Verona, while the ranks of the 80th Regiment were filled with men from Mantua. Its I CC.NN. Battalion "Sabauda" was made up of Blackshirt volunteers from Turin.

== History ==
The division's lineage begins with the Brigade "Roma" established in Rome on 1 November 1884 with the 79th and 80th infantry regiments.

=== World War I ===
The brigade fought on the Italian front in World War I. On 20 December 1926 the brigade assumed the name of IX Infantry Brigade with the 49th Infantry Regiment "Parma", 57th Infantry Regiment "Abruzzi", and 79th Infantry Regiment "Roma", while the 80th Infantry Regiment "Roma" was disbanded. The brigade was the infantry component of the 9th Territorial Division of Verona, which also included the 8th Artillery Regiment. In 1934 the division changed its name to 9th Infantry Division "Pasubio". In April 1939 the division ceded the 49th Infantry Regiment "Parma" to the 49th Infantry Division "Parma" and the 57th Infantry Regiment "Abruzzi" to the 10th Infantry Division "Piave", and received the re-raised 80th Infantry Regiment "Roma" from the 16th Infantry Division "Pistoia". On the same date the 79th and 80th infantry regiments, and the 8th Artillery Regiment changed their names to "Pasubio".

=== World War II ===
==== Yugoslavia ====
The Pasubio took part in the Invasion of Yugoslavia in April 1941. First it was deployed at San Pietro del Carso (near modern Pivka). By 16 April the division had overcome border defenses and reached the road to Otocac. Closer to the end of war, it reached Šibenik-Split region where it participated in mop-up operations until 28 May 1941. After the end of the military operation in Yugoslavia, the Pasubio returned to Verona.

==== Soviet Union ====
In July 1941 the division was assigned to the Italian Expeditionary Corps in Russia and left Verona on 10 July 1941. It reached Yampil on the Dniester river on 6 August 1941. The first contact with the Soviet troops happened on 10 August 1941 near town of Voznesensk on the Southern Bug river. The Polyana village was reached by 12 August 1941. From 18 September 1941 until 26 September 1941 the Pasubio participated in the Battle of Kyiv, capturing and holding a bridgehead on the eastern side of the Dnieper river. In October 1941 the Pasubio advanced by the route of Petrikovka-Dnipropetrovsk-Pavlohrad-Ulyanivka(Kharkiv Oblast)-Izium. The Pasubio played a significant role in the capture of Stalino in October 1941, earning the praise of the German First Panzer Group's commander, General Ewald von Kleist. On 1 November 1941, the Pasubio attacked Horlivka and captured it after fierce fighting. The village of Nikitovka north of Horlivka fell soon thanks to a rapid advance. The division also contributed significantly to the capture of the Shazopetovka and Bulavyns'ke to the east of Horlivka. By that time, the Soviets forces increased to an extent where the Pasubio Division was forced to switch to the defense.

In January 1942 the Pasubio division helped German troops fighting in the Izium area, where it defeated a heavy Soviet attack near the village of Novaya Orlovka. By July 1942, Pasubio division fought near the town of Krasnyi Luch. In August, it reached the Don, where the right flank of the division was heavily attacked by Soviet forces on 20 August 1942. The attack was repelled in a few days, and the division's position on the Don remained unchanged until 11 December 1942, when the Soviets attacked with a large number of tanks. By 16 December 1942 the Pasubio's counterattacks had reestablished the initial positions, but by that time the collapse of the entire Italian front-line was already underway. Nearby the 52nd Infantry Division "Torino" and 2nd Infantry Division "Sforzesca" had failed to maintain their positions, and therefore the Pasubio was forced to retreat to avoid encirclement. After a few days of retreat, the Pasubio was no longer able to maintain a coherent front-line and choose to only cover the roads of its retreat. On 25 December 1942, a rearguard of 600 men was surrounded in the village of Krasnoyarovka in Rostov Oblast and annihilated by 28 December 1942. The main body of the division had retreated with remnants of German units to the northern part of Chertkovo village, where they repelled several attacks starting from 23 December 1942. Afterwards the grueling march to first avoid, and then to break the Soviet encirclement, continued. On 15 January 1943 the fight to break through the Soviet lines started. Finally, the 2,000 men remaining of the division broke the encirclement on 17 January 1943 near the town of Belovodsk in Luhansk Oblast.

The Pasubio's troops marched to Stalino and the remnants of the division were repatriated in April 1943. The division received some minor existing units and was in the process of being reformed, when it was transferred to Caserta for coastal defense duties. The division's garrisons there were the villages of Avena, Grazzanise, Sparanise, and the town of Santa Maria Capua Vetere. The garrisons were captured by the invading German forces after the announcement of the Armistice of Cassibile on 8 September 1943.

While the Pasubio was in the Soviet Union the division's regimental depots in Italy raised the 104th Infantry Division "Mantova": the 79th Infantry Regiment "Pasubio" raised the 113th Infantry Regiment "Mantova", the 80th Infantry Regiment "Pasubio" raised the 114th Infantry Regiment "Mantova", and the 8th Artillery Regiment "Pasubio" raised the 108th Motorized Artillery Regiment.

== Organization ==
9th Infantry Division "Pasubio" organization in 1940

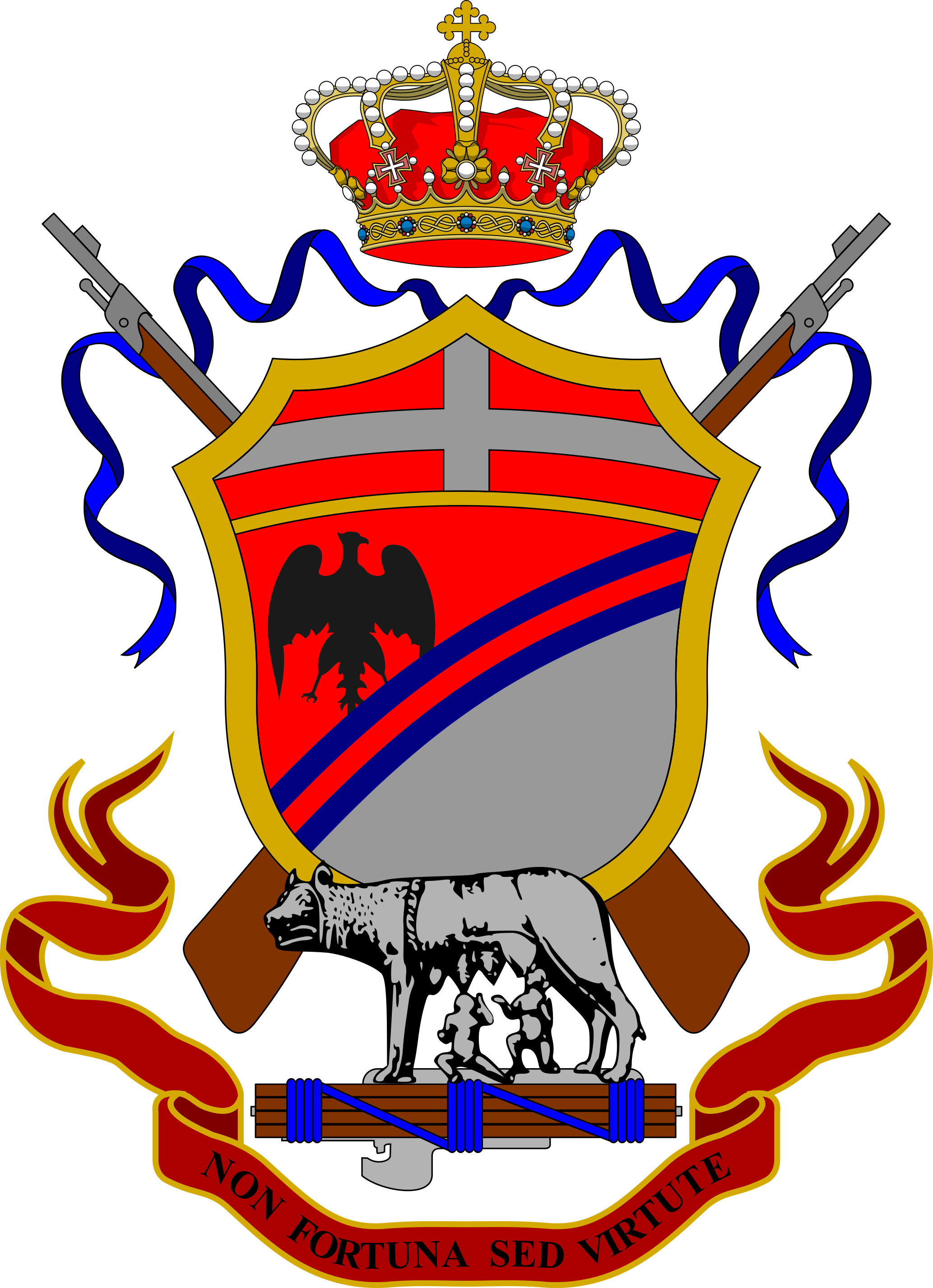
Coat of Arms of the 79th Infantry Regiment "Roma", 1939

When the division was deployed to the Soviet Union it consisted of the following units:

- 9th Infantry Division "Pasubio", in Verona
  - Headquarters
    - Command Company
    - 25th Carabinieri Section
    - 26th Carabinieri Section
    - 83rd Field Post Office
    - 9th Infantry Division Command Transport Squad
  - 79th Infantry Regiment "Pasubio", (Note: Named 79th Infantry Regiment "Roma" until 1939 when the army reorganized its divisions as binary divisions and divisional infantry regiments took the name of the division.) in Verona
    - Command Company
    - 3 × Fusilier battalions
    - Support Weapons Battery (65/17 mod. 13 infantry support guns)
    - Mortar Company (81mm mod. 35 mortars)
  - 80th Infantry Regiment "Pasubio", (Note: Named 80th Infantry Regiment "Roma" until 1939 when the army reorganized its divisions as binary divisions and divisional infantry regiments took the name of the division.) in Mantua
    - Command Company
    - 3 × Fusilier battalions
    - Support Weapons Battery (65/17 mod. 13 infantry support guns)
    - Mortar Company (81mm mod. 35 mortars)
  - 8th Artillery Regiment "Pasubio", in Verona
    - Command Unit
    - I Group (100/17 mod. 14 howitzers)
    - II Group (75/27 mod. 11 field guns)
    - III Group (75/27 mod. 11 field guns)
    - 73rd Anti-tank Battery (75/39 anti-tank guns; attached during the deployment in the Soviet Union)
    - 85th Anti-aircraft Battery (20/65 mod. 35 anti-aircraft guns)
    - 309th Anti-aircraft Battery (20/65 mod. 35 anti-aircraft guns; attached during the deployment in the Soviet Union)
    - Ammunition and Supply Unit
  - V Mortar Battalion (81mm mod. 35 mortars, detached from the 5th Infantry Division "Cosseria" for the campaign in the Soviet Union)
  - IX Mortar Battalion (81mm mod. 35 mortars)
  - 9th Anti-tank Company (47/32 mod. 35 anti-tank guns)
  - 141st Anti-tank Company (47/32 mod. 35 anti-tank guns; transferred from the 131st Armored Division "Centauro" for the deployment in the Soviet Union)
  - 9th Telegraph and Radio Operators Company
  - 30th Engineer Company
  - 190th Heavy Transport Unit (attached for the deployment in the Soviet Union)
    - 813th Heavy Transport Section
    - 814th Heavy Transport Section
  - 5th Medical Section
    - 825th Field Hospital
    - 826th Field Hospital
    - 836th Field Hospital
    - 874th Field Hospital
    - 25th Surgical Unit
  - 11th Supply Section
  - 9th Autocarrette Section
  - 809th Transport Section

After the division's return from the campaign in the Soviet Union it was assigned already existing minor support units to speed up the process of reforming the division:

- 51st Transport Section
- 131st Medical Section
- 131st Supply Section
- 244th Carabinieri Section
- 245th Carabinieri Section
- 177th Field Post Office

During this process the division's engineer units were merged into the newly formed XXIX Mixed Engineer Battalion.

== Military honors ==
For their conduct during the Italian campaign in the Soviet Union the President of Italy awarded the 79th Infantry Regiment "Pasubio" and the 8th Artillery Regiment "Pasubio" Italy's highest military honor, the Gold Medal of Military Valor. The 80th Infantry Regiment "Pasubio" was awarded two Gold Medals of Military Valor - the only line infantry regiment so honored during the entire conflict.

- 79th Infantry Regiment "Pasubio" on 31 December 1947
- 80th Infantry Regiment "Pasubio" on 31 December 1947
- 80th Infantry Regiment "Pasubio" on 8 February 1945
- 8th Artillery Regiment "Pasubio" on 26 December 1951

== Commanding officers ==
The division's commanding officers were:

- Generale di Divisione Vittorio Giovanelli (10.07.1940 - 16.09.1942)
- Generale di Brigata Roberto Olmi (acting) (17.09.1942 - 03.12.1942)
- Generale di Divisione Guido Boselli (04.12.1942 - 06.02.1943)
- Generale di Brigata Cesare Gandini (acting)
- Lieutenant Colonel Luigi Filippo Cangini (acting)
- Generale di Brigata Carlo Biglino (15.05.1943 - 09.09.1943)
