= 209th Coastal Division =

Royal Italian Army infantry division during World War II

- Active: 1943 – 1945
- Country: Kingdom of Italy
- Branch: Royal Italian Army
- Size: Division
- Garrison/HQ: Noicattaro
- Engagements: World War II

Insignia
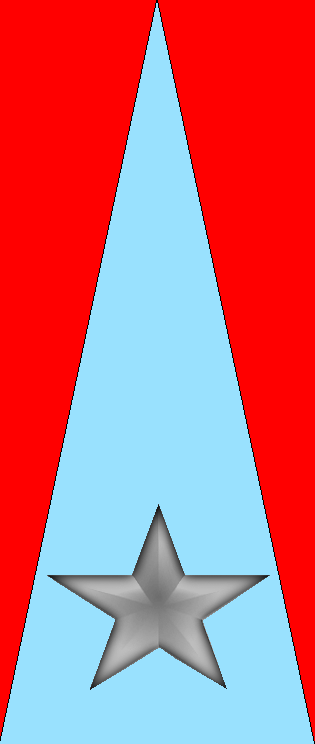
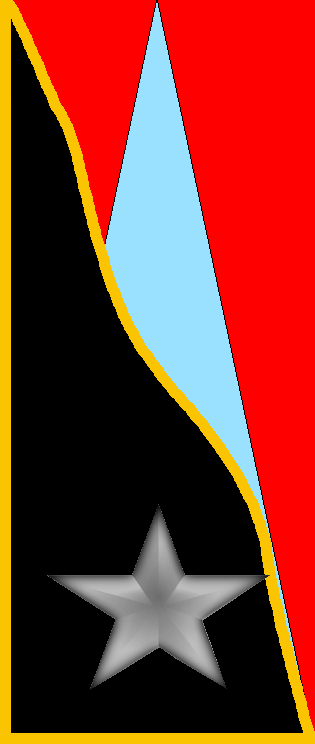
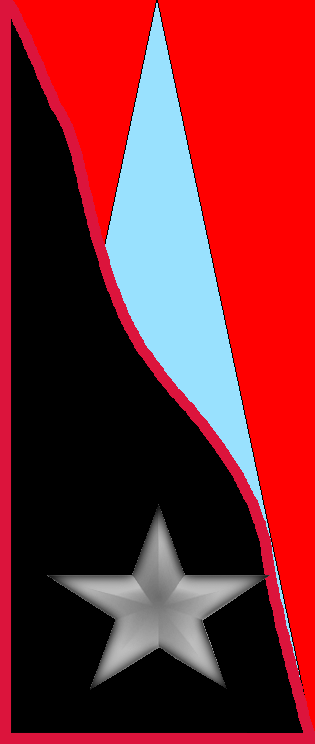
- Identification symbol: 209th Coastal Division gorget patches

The 209th Coastal Division (Italian: 209ª Divisione Costiera) was an infantry division of the Royal Italian Army during World War II. Royal Italian Army coastal divisions were second line divisions formed with reservists and equipped with second rate materiel. They were often commanded by officers called out of retirement.

== History ==
The division was activated on 20 April 1943 in Bari by expanding the IX Coastal Brigade. The division was assigned to IX Army Corps and had its headquarter in Noicattaro. The division was responsible for the coastal defense of the coast of northern Apulia between the river Saccione and Torre Testa del Gallico near Brindisi.

After the Armistice of Cassibile was announced on 8 September 1943 the division immediately fought German forces and then surrendered on 11 September to the British 1st Airborne Division. On 15 September the Allies reactivated the division, which joined the Italian Co-belligerent Army and for the rest of the Italian campaign performed rear area security and work duties as 209th Division for the British Eighth Army. The division was disbanded in autumn 1945.

== Organization ==
- 209th Coastal Division, in Noicattaro
  - 112th Coastal Regiment
    - 3 × Coastal battalions
  - 15th Coastal Regiment
    - 3 × Coastal battalions
  - 41st Coastal Artillery Grouping
    - 4 × Coastal artillery groups
  - IX Machine Gun Battalion
  - 209th Mixed Engineer Company
  - 264th Anti-paratroopers Unit
  - 432nd Anti-paratroopers Unit
  - 434th Anti-paratroopers Unit
  - 209th Carabinieri Section
  - 185th Field Post Office
  - Division Services

Attached to the division:

- Harbor Defense Command Bari, in Bari
  - XIX Garrison Battalion
  - XLI Bersaglieri Battalion
  - CXXXV Coastal Battalion
  - CXCVI Coastal Artillery Group
  - CXCVII Coastal Artillery Group
  - LXXXIX Coastal Artillery Group
  - 15th Anti-tank Company (47/32 mod. 35 anti-tank guns)
  - 692nd Machine Gun Company
  - 4th Airfield Defense Grouping, at Bari Air Base (Royal Italian Air Force)
    - XI Airmen Battalion
    - VIII Anti-aircraft Artillery Group
    - 3 × Anti-aircraft artillery batteries
- CCLIII CC.NN. Battalion

== Commanding officers ==
The division's commanding officers were:

- Generale di Brigata Luigi Amato (20 April 1943 - ?)
- Generale di Divisione Roberto Olmi (1945)
