= 20th Artillery Regiment "Piave" =

Inactive Italian Army artillery unit

- 20° Reggimento Artiglieria "Piave"
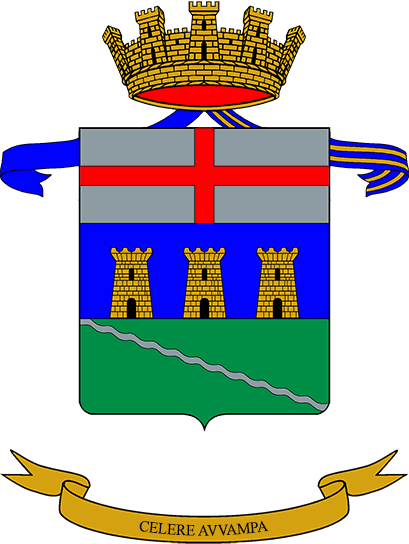
- Regimental coat of arms
- Active: 1 Nov. 1888 – 10 Sept. 1943; 1 Nov. 1975 – 31 March 1991
- Country: Italy
- Branch: Italian Army
- Part of: Armored Brigade "Ariete"
- Garrison/HQ: Maniago
- Motto: "Celere avvampa"
- Anniversaries: 15 June 1918 - Second Battle of the Piave River
- Decorations: 1x Bronze Medal of Military Valor; 1× Bronze Medal of Army Valor

Insignia
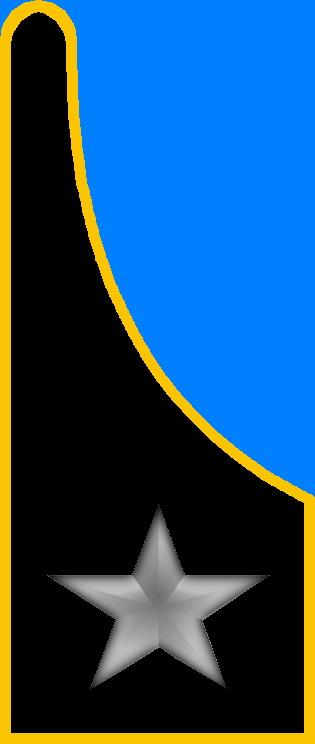
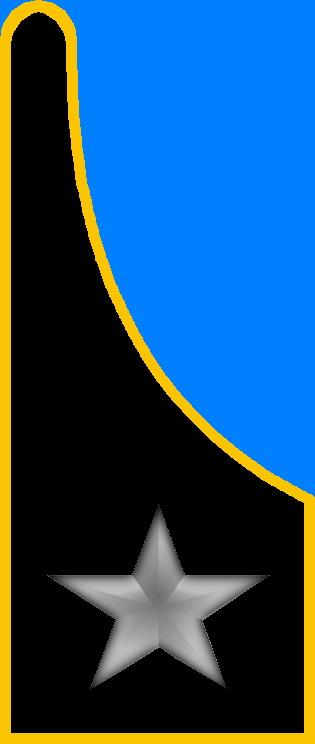
- Regimental gorget patches

The 20th Artillery Regiment "Piave" (Italian: 20° Reggimento Artiglieria "Piave") is an inactive field artillery regiment of the Italian Army, which was based in Maniago in Friuli-Venezia Giulia. Originally an artillery regiment of the Royal Italian Army, the regiment was formed in 1888 and served in World War I on the Italian front. In 1935 the regiment was assigned to the 10th Infantry Division "Piave", with which the regiment served in World War II. After the Armistice of Cassibile was announced on 8 September 1943, the division and its regiments were disbanded on 10 September by invading German forces.

The unit was reformed in 1975 as 20th Self-propelled Field Artillery Group "Piave" and assigned to the 132nd Armored Brigade "Manin". With the end of the Cold War the group was disbanded in 1991. The regimental anniversary falls, as for all Italian Army artillery regiments, on June 15, the beginning of the Second Battle of the Piave River in 1918.

== History ==
On 1 November 1888 the 20th Field Artillery Regiment was formed in Padua. The new regiment consisted of eight batteries and one train company ceded by the 8th Field Artillery Regiment. The ceded batteries had participated in the Second, and Third Italian War of Independence, as well as the Piedmontese invasion of Central and Southern Italy in 1860–61. One of the ceded batteries had distinguished itself in the invasion of Southern Italy at the sieges of Capua, Gaeta and Messina and been awarded a Bronze Medal of Military Valor, which was affixed to the regiment's flag and is depicted on the regiment's coat of arms.

In 1895-96 the regiment provided two officers and 54 troops to units deployed to Eritrea for the First Italo-Ethiopian War. In 1911-12 the regiment provided 19 officers and 199 troops for units deployed for the Italo-Turkish War. On 1 January 1915 the regiment ceded its III Group to help form the 29th Field Artillery Regiment.

=== World War I ===
At the outbreak of World War I the regiment was assigned, together with the Brigade "Marche" and Brigade "Abruzzi", to the 10th Division. At the time the regiment consisted of a command, three groups with a combined eight batteries equipped with 75/27 mod. 06 field guns, and a depot. During the war the regiment's depot formed two siege batteries. During the war the regiment fought in the Dolomites at Tre Cime di Lavaredo, on Monte Piana, and Kreuzbergpass in summer 1915, before moving to the Isonzo front for the Third Battle of the Isonzo and Fourth Battle of the Isonzo, during which the regiment fought at Oslavia and on Podgora hill. In April 1916 the regiment returned to the Dolomites and fought at the Passo della Sentinella, before deploying to the Valsugana for the Battle of Asiago. In June 1916 the regiment was deployed on the Ortigara. After the Battle of Caporetto the regiment was on Col della Berretta and Monte Pertica before fighting on the Col Bonato and the Asolone ridge of Monte Grappa. The year 1918 began for the regiment with the Battles of Monte Grappa on Asolone, before being transferred to the Spinoncia sector. In June 1918 the regiment fought on the Montello during the Second Battle of the Piave River. In fall 1918 the regiment fought on Monte Valderoa in the Grappa range during the Battle of Vittorio Veneto.

In 1926 the 20th Field Artillery Regiment was assigned to the 10th Territorial Division of Padua and consisted of a command, one group with 100/17 mod. 14 howitzers, two groups with 75/27 mod. 11 field guns, one group with mule-carried 75/13 mod. 15 mountain guns, and a depot.

On 31 October 1934 the regiment transferred its I Motorized Group with 100/17 mod. 14 howitzers to the 11th Army Corps Artillery Regiment and replaced it with a group with horse-drawn 100/17 mod. 14 howitzers. In January 1935 the division was renamed 10th Infantry Division "Piave" and consequently the regiment changed its name to 20th Artillery Regiment "Piave". In 1935 the regiment provided 18 officers and 649 enlisted to augment units deployed for the Second Italo-Ethiopian War.

=== World War II ===
On 4 September 1939 the regiment was fully motorized and on 4 November of the same year the regiment ceded its group with 75/13 mod. 15 mountain guns to help reform the 32nd Artillery Regiment "Marche" of the 32nd Infantry Division "Marche". On 10 June 1940, the day Italy entered World War II, the regiment consisted of a command, command unit, the I Group with 100/17 mod. 14 howitzers, the II and III groups with 75/27 mod. 11 field guns, and an anti-aircraft battery with 20/65 mod. 35 anti-aircraft guns. The regiment was assigned to the 10th Infantry Division "Piave", which also included the 57th Infantry Regiment "Piave" and 58th Infantry Regiment "Piave".

In April 1941 the division participated in the Invasion of Yugoslavia. By 16 April 1941 the division had advanced to the Pivka area. Once hostilities ended the division moved in May 1941 to Liguria, where it was motorized. On 15 July 1941 the division was renamed 10th Motorized Division "Piave" and by 30 July the 20th Artillery Regiment "Piave" consisted of a command, command unit, the I and II groups with 100/17 mod. 14 howitzers, the III and IV groups with 75/27 mod. 11 field guns, the XII Mixed Anti-aircraft Group with two batteries equipped with 75/27 C.K. anti-aircraft guns on Lancia 1Z trucks and one battery with 20/65 mod. 35 anti-aircraft guns, and the 220th Anti-tank Battery with 47/32 mod. 35 anti-tank guns.

On 15 August 1941 the regiment's depot in Padua formed the 120th Motorized Artillery Regiment. In October 1941 the XII Mixed Anti-aircraft Group was disbanded and only the battery with 20/65 mod. 35 anti-aircraft guns remained with the regiment. On 12 November 1942 the Piave moved to the area between Saint-Tropez and Grimaud in Southern France as part of the Axis occupation of France.

After the announcement of the Armistice of Cassibile on 8 September 1943 the division was tasked to defend Rome from invading German forces. The division defenders fought the Germans near Monterotondo until 10 September, but the flight of King Victor Emmanuel III to Apulia made further resistance senseless. On 10 September 1943 the Germans disbanded the division and its regiments.

=== Cold War ===
During the 1975 army reform the army disbanded the regimental level and newly independent battalions and groups were granted for the first time their own flags. On 1 November 1975 the 132nd Armored Artillery Regiment's III Self-propelled Field Artillery Group in Maniago was renamed 20th Self-propelled Field Artillery Group "Piave" and assigned to the 132nd Armored Brigade "Manin". The group consisted of a command, a command and services battery, and three batteries equipped with M109G 155 mm self-propelled howitzers. At the time the group fielded 477 men (38 officers, 62 non-commissioned officers, and 377 soldiers).

On 12 November 1976 the President of the Italian Republic Giovanni Leone assigned with decree 846 the flag and traditions of the 20th Artillery Regiment "Piave" to the group. For its conduct and work after the 1976 Friuli earthquake the group was awarded a Bronze Medal of Army Valor, which was affixed to the group's flag and added to the group's coat of arms.

In 1986 the Italian Army abolished the divisional level and brigades, which until then had been under one of the Army's four divisions, came under direct command of the Army's 3rd Army Corps or 5th Army Corps. As the Armored Division "Ariete" carried the traditions of the 132nd Armored Division "Ariete", which had distinguished itself in the Western Desert campaign of World War II, the army decided to retain the name of the division. On 30 September 1986 the Ariete's division command in Pordenone was disbanded and the next day the command of the 132nd Armored Brigade "Manin" moved from Aviano to Pordenone, where the command was renamed 132nd Armored Brigade "Ariete". The brigade retained the Manin's units, including the 20th Self-propelled Field Artillery Group "Piave".

=== Recent times ===
On 30 January 1991 the 19th Self-propelled Field Artillery Group "Rialto" was transferred from the 8th Mechanized Brigade "Garibaldi" to the 132nd Armored Brigade "Ariete". The next day the 20th Self-propelled Field Artillery Group "Piave" was placed in reserve status. On 8 February of the same year the flag of the 20th Artillery Regiment "Piave" was transferred to the Shrine of the Flags in the Vittoriano in Rome and on 31 March the group was officially disbanded.

== See also ==
- Armored Brigade "Ariete"
