= Vittorio Giovanelli =

Italian general

- Born: 16 September 1882; Turin, Kingdom of Italy
- Died: 14 June 1966 (aged 83); Rome, Italy
- Military career
- Allegiance: Kingdom of Italy
- Branch: Royal Italian Army
- Service years: 1902–1955
- Rank: Lieutenant General
- Commands: 25th Field Artillery Regiment; Nunziatella Military School; 9th Infantry Division Pasubio
- Conflicts: World War I; Battles of the Isonzo; World War II; Battle of the Western Alps; Axis invasion of Yugoslavia; Italian campaign on the Eastern Front
- Awards: Bronze Medal of Military Valor; Military Order of Savoy; Iron Cross First Class; Iron Cross Second Class

Vittorio Giovanelli (Turin, 16 September 1882 – Rome, 14 June 1966) was an Italian general during World War II.

== Biography ==
Born in Turin in 1882, the son of Emanuele Giovanelli and Maria Fossati Rayneri, he graduated from a classical high school in 1901. He then enlisted in the Royal Italian Army as a private and entered the Military Academy of Artillery and Engineers of Turin in 1902, graduating as artillery second lieutenant on 5 September 1904. Having attended an application course and been promoted to lieutenant, he was assigned to the 5th Field Artillery Regiment in Venaria Reale until 15 September 1910, when he was transferred to the Academy of Turin as a riding instructor. After promotion to captain, on 14 January 1915 he was assigned to the 23rd Field Artillery Regiment of Acqui Terme, while remaining at the war school, and after Italy's entry into World War I on 24 May 1915 he was transferred to the 48th Field Artillery Regiment of Asti as battery commander and sent to the Julian front. In July he was wounded in the left knee on Mount Jakob in an action that earned him the Bronze Medal of Military Valor. He was hospitalized in Treviso and spent over two years recovering, only returning to service on 1 November 1917, when he was formally assigned to the depot of the 23rd Field Artillery Regiment in Acqui Terme but attached to the Ministry of Arms and Ammunition in Rome, where he was promoted to major and put in charge of the ammunition and research office.

After the war, from 23 February 1919 he was assigned to the artillery directorate of Turin as deputy director, and from 7 March 1920 he was transferred to the General Staff and entrusted the intelligence office of the territorial military division command of Novara. After promotion to lieutenant colonel he was transferred to the 11th Field Artillery Regiment in Alessandria, and from the following 1 November he was assigned to the Royal Academy of Turin, as a teacher of military art and use of artillery. He was promoted to colonel on 18 March 1931 and given command of the 25th Field Artillery Regiment of Nola, before becoming head of office of the artillery command of the X Army Corps of Naples. From 1 September 1935 he became commander of the Nunziatella Military School, and on 31 October 1937 he was promoted to brigadier general and appointed Inspector of the military chemical service at the ministry in Rome.

On 1 January 1940 he was promoted to major general and on the following, 10 June, the day of Italy's entry into World War II, he became commander of the 9th Infantry Division Pasubio, which he led during the brief campaign against France in June 1940 and the invasion of Yugoslavia in April 1941; "Pasubio" then remained in Yugoslavia for occupation duty till June 1941, after which it was repatriated and redeployed, from the following month, on the Eastern Front as part of the Italian Expeditionary Corps in Russia and later of the Italian Army in Russia. For his leadership during the fighting on the Eastern Front from July 1941 to September 1942, Giovanelli was awarded the Officer's Cross of the Military Order of Savoy by the Italian authorities, and the Iron Cross first and second class by the German authorities.

On 16 September 1942, having reached age 60, he left command of the division and returned to Italy, where he was briefly placed at the disposal of the Ministry of War until November 1, when he was transferred to the Army reserve. He was promoted to lieutenant general on May 17, 1952, and placed on absolute leave on September 16, 1955. He died in Rome on June 14, 1966, at the age of 83.
