= Roberto Olmi =

Italian general

- Born: 9 May 1890; Bobbio, Kingdom of Italy
- Died: 13 September 1968 (aged 78); Bobbio, Italy
- Military career
- Allegiance: Kingdom of Italy
- Branch: Royal Italian Army
- Rank: Major General
- Commands: Monte Pavione Alpini Battalion; 96th Infantry Regiment; 9th Infantry Division Pasubio; 58th Infantry Division Legnano; 209th Auxiliary Division
- Conflicts: Italo-Turkish War; World War I; Battle of Caporetto; Spanish Civil War; World War II; Italian campaign on the Easter Front; Italian occupation of France; Operation Achse
- Awards: Silver Medal of Military Valor; War Cross for Military Valor (twice)

Roberto Olmi (9 May 1890 – 13 September 1968) was an Italian general during World War II.

== Biography ==
Born in Bobbio in 1890, he attended Italian military academy in 1908-1910 and graduated as lieutenant in the Alpini, then participating in the Italo-Turkish War. At the outbreak of World War I he held the rank of captain; he was later promoted to major in the 7th Alpini Regiment, assuming command of the Monte Pavione Alpini Battalion. In November 1917, after the battle of Caporetto, his battalion was tasked with holding Cima Campo in the Venetian Prealps in order to slow down the Austro-Hungarian advance long enough to allow the XVIII Army Corps to disengage and reach the new defensive positions on Monte Grappa. After three days of bitter fighting against an entire Austro-Hungarian division, the battalion was overwhelmed and destroyed, having fulfilled its purpose of buying time for the defenders of Monte Grappa (the First Battle of Monte Grappa began immediately after the fall of Cima Campo); Olmi was thus captured on 12 November 1917. For the defense of Cima Campo he was awarded a War Cross for Military Valor.

Repatriated after the end of the war, in 1921 he married Miss Jo Di Benigno, with whom he had a son in 1922. On January 1, 1936 he was promoted to colonel and given command of the 96th Infantry Regiment; he then participated in the Spanish Civil War from 1937 to 1939, commanding armored units of the Corps of Volunteer Troops, after which he was assigned to the Milan Army Corps, where he was at the time of the Italian intervention in the Second World War.

On 1 October 1940 he was promoted to brigadier general, and in December 1941, after a period at the Italian Armistice Commission with France, he became commander of the infantry of the 9th Infantry Division Pasubio, part of the Italian Expeditionary Corps in Russia; during the fighting on the Eastern Front he was awarded several decorations, including a Silver Medal of Military Valor for repulsing a Soviet offensive on the Don river between August and September 1942. From 13 September to 4 December 1942 he assumed command of the entire division, then returning to Italy just before the start of Operation Little Saturn.

On 29 December 1942 he became commander of the 58th Infantry Division Legnano, with headquarters in Nice, being promoted to major general on July 1, 1943. In September 1943, while his division was being transferred from Provence to Apulia, he found himself by chance in Pescara when the Armistice of Cassibile was announced; shortly afterwards, King Victor Emmanuel III, Prime Minister Pietro Badoglio and the leaders of the Italian armed forces fled from Rome to Pescara, and Olmi was tasked by General Vittorio Ambrosio, Army Chief of Staff, with establishing a defensive cordon running from Chieti to Ortona and Pescara, in order to prevent the capture of the king and government by German forces while they awaited for a ship that would carry them to Brindisi.

Olmi then reached Rome, where he joined the Resistance in the Clandestine Military Front; after the liberation of Rome in June 1944 he resumed service with the Italian Co-belligerent Army, and in early 1945 he was given command of the 209th Auxiliary Division in Perugia.

He died in his native Bobbio in 1968.
