= 10th Infantry Division "Piave" =

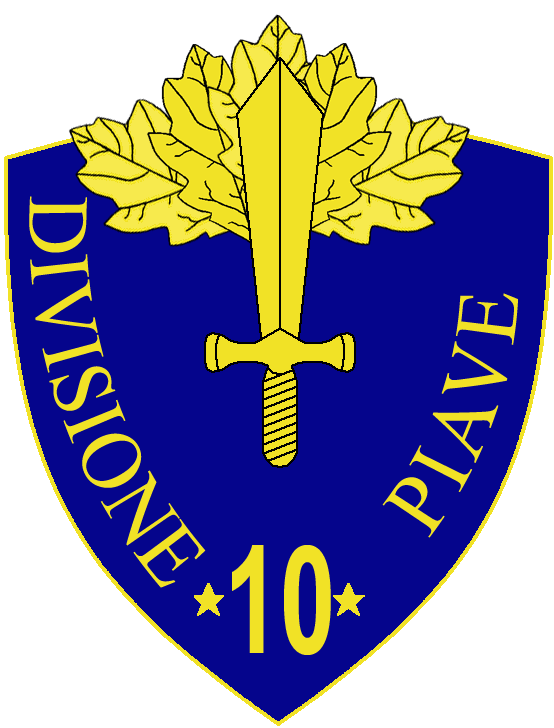
- 10th Infantry Division "Piave" insignia
- Active: 1939– 23 September 1943
- Country: Kingdom of Italy
- Branch: Royal Italian Army
- Role: Infantry
- Size: Division
- Garrison/HQ: Padua
- Engagements: World War II

Commanders
- Notable commanders: General Francesco Zingales; General Ercole Roncaglia

Insignia
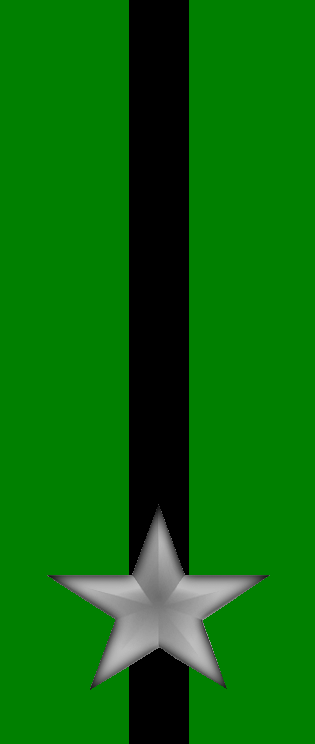
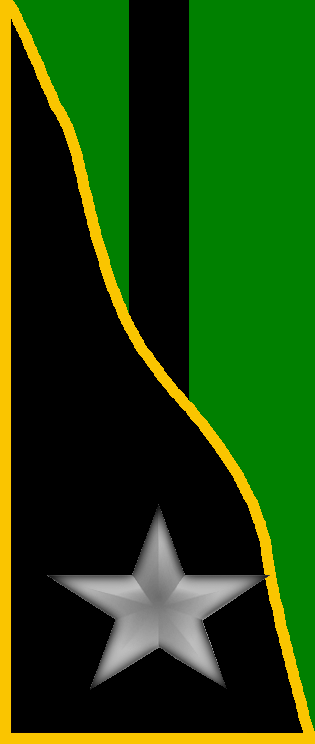
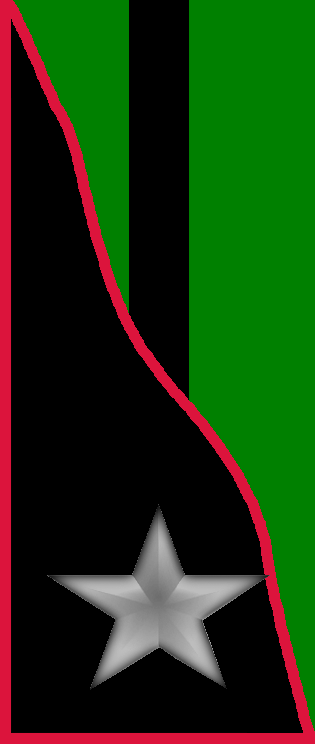
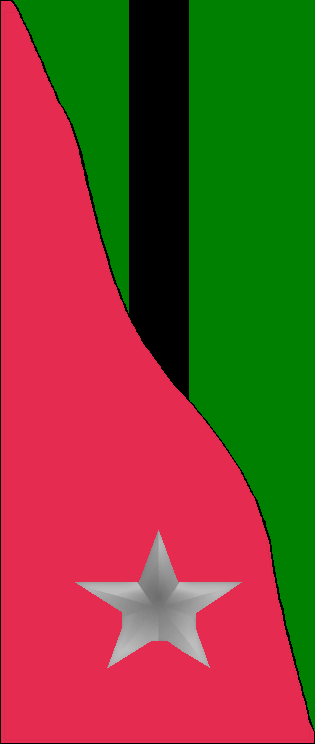
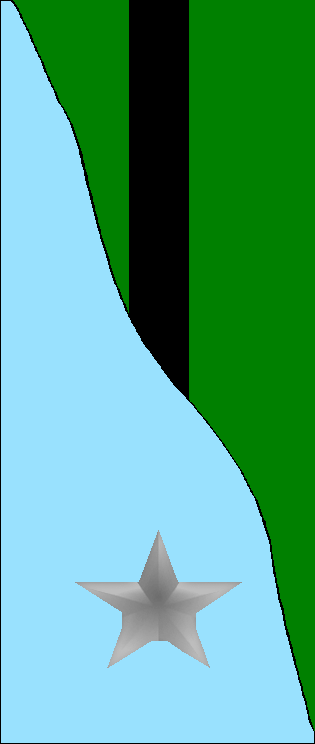
- Identification symbol: Piave Division gorget patches

The 10th Infantry Division "Piave" (Italian: 10ª Divisione di fanteria "Piave") was an infantry division of the Royal Italian Army during World War II. At the beginning of World War II Piave was classified as an auto-transportable division, meaning it had some motorized transport, but not enough to move the entire division at once. On 15 July 1941 the division reorganized to a fully motorized division and was renamed 10th Motorized Division "Piave" (Italian: 10ª Divisione motorizzata "Piave"). The division was named after the river Piave, where during World War I Italy and Austria fought three major battles. The division had its recruiting area in Veneto and its headquarters in Padua. Its two infantry regiments were based in Vicenza (57th) and Padua (58th), with the division's artillery regiment also based in Padua.

== History ==
The division's lineage begins with the Brigade "Abruzzi" established on 16 April 1861 with the 57th and 58th infantry regiments.

=== World War I ===
The brigade fought on the Italian front in World War I. On 31 December 1926 the brigade was disbanded and its two regiments were transferred to the other brigades: the 57th Infantry Regiment "Abruzzi" to the IX Infantry Brigade and the 58th Infantry Regiment "Abruzzi" to the X Infantry Brigade. The X Infantry Brigade, which also included the 56th Infantry Regiment "Marche" and the 71st Infantry Regiment "Puglie", was the infantry component of the 10th Territorial Division of Padua, which also included the 20th Artillery Regiment. On 1 January 1928 the X Infantry Brigade exchanged the 56th Infantry Regiment "Marche" for the 55th Infantry Regiment "Marche" of the XIII Infantry Brigade. In 1934 the division changed its name to 10th Infantry Division "Piave".

On 22 February 1939 the 55th Infantry Regiment "Marche" was transferred to the newly raised 32nd Infantry Division "Marche" and on 15 May 1939 the 71st Infantry Regiment "Puglie" was transferred to the newly raised 38th Infantry Division "Puglie". On the same date the 57th Infantry Regiment "Abruzzi" returned to the division, the X Infantry Brigade was dissolved and the two infantry regiments came under direct command of the division, and the 57th and 58th infantry regiments and 20th Artillery Regiment changed their names to "Piave".

=== World War II ===
On 10 June 1940 the Piave division was mobilized for war, but did not participated in hostilities. In early February 1941, it moved to Sicily in the area of Casteltermini, Canicattì, Aragona and Mussomeli. At the time it was subordinated to the XII Army Corps. In February 1941 it received additional materiel to become a "motorized division". On 27 March 1941 the Piave was sent to the province of Udine on the Italian-Yugoslav border in preparation for the Invasion of Yugoslavia, which commenced in April 1941. By 16 April 1941 the division had advanced to the Pivka area. Once hostilities ended the division moved to Liguria between Savona and Genoa, where it arrived in May 1941. Between 21 June and 15 July 1941 the division was fully motorized and changed its name on the latter date to 10th Motorized Division "Piave".

In spring 1942 the regimental depots of the Piave raised the infantry and artillery units of the 105th Infantry Division "Rovigo". On 12 November 1942 the Piave moved to the area between Saint-Tropez and Grimaud in Southern France as part of the Axis occupation of France.

Between 1–10 January 1943 the division returned to Italy, where it was assigned to the Corpo d'Armata Motocorazzato, whose duty was to guard the southern approaches to Rome from a possible allied invasion. The division stayed in Velletri-Sezze-Priverno until August 1943 when the Italian focus shifted to prevent a possible German invasion. The division therefore moved to the North of Rome to the area around Via Cassia and Via Tiburtina. After Armistice of Cassibile was announced on 8 September 1943 the Piave received orders to move to Palombara Sabina, but was ambushed on the way by German detachments at Ponte del Grillo, north of Monterotondo. The division counterattacked and forced the German forces to retreat to Monterotondo. After negotiations with the German command, the Piave was transferred to the control of the municipal council of Rome and performed police duties in the city until the Germans dissolved the division on 23 September 1943.

== Organization ==
10th Infantry Division "Piave" organization in 1940

10th Motorized Division "Piave" organization in 1941

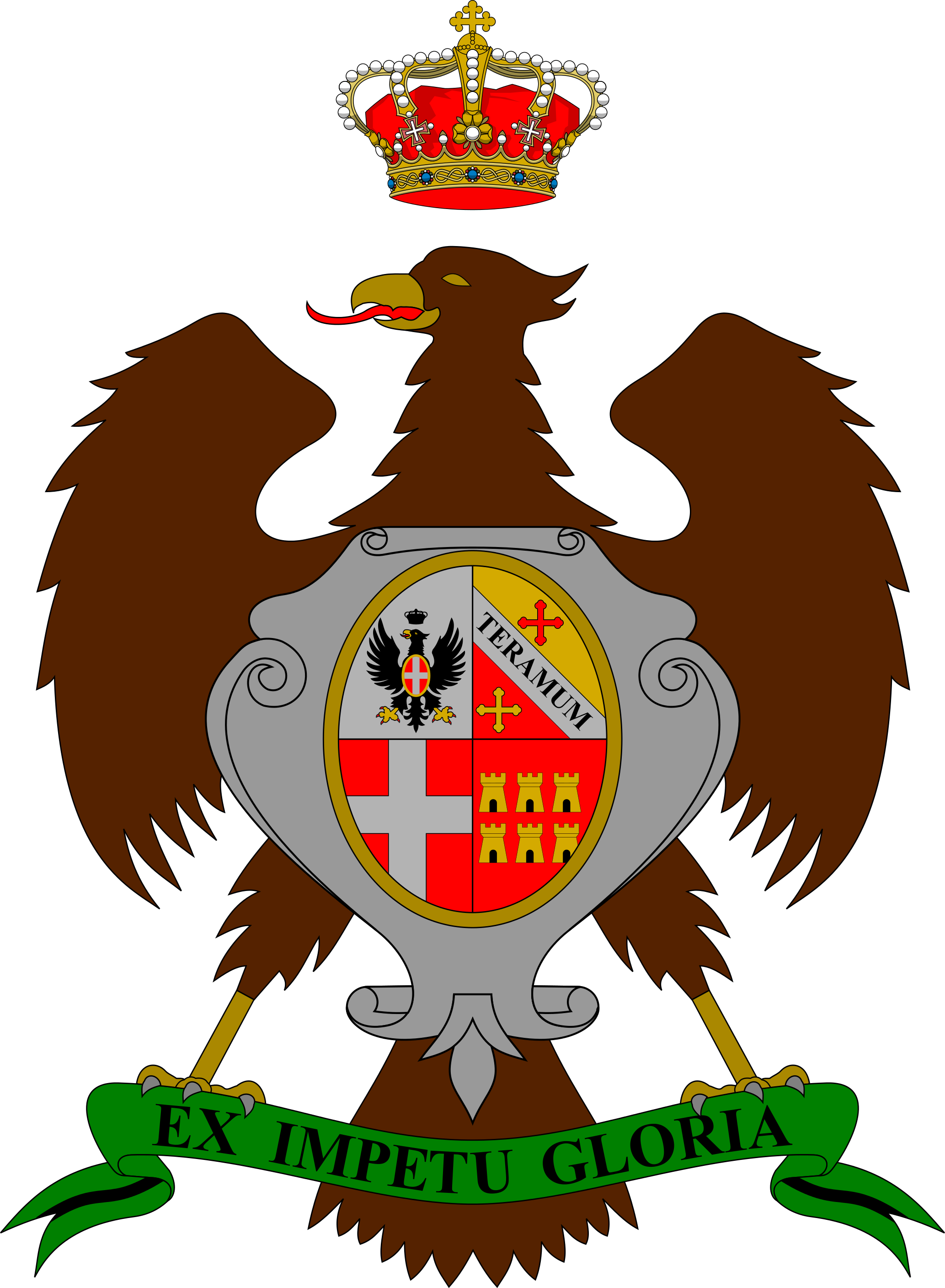
Coat of Arms of the 57th Infantry Regiment "Abruzzi", 1939

- 10th Infantry Division "Piave" / 10th Motorized Division "Piave", in Padua
  - Headquarters
    - Command Company
    - 31st Carabinieri Section
    - 32nd Carabinieri Section (left the division, when it was reorganized as a motorized division)
    - 66th Field Post Office
    - 10th Infantry Division Command Transport Squad
  - 57th Infantry Regiment "Piave", (Note: Named 57th Infantry Regiment "Abruzzi" until 1939 when the army reorganized its divisions as binary divisions and divisional infantry regiments took the name of the division.) in Vicenza
    - Command Company
    - 3 × Fusilier battalions
    - Support Weapons Battery (65/17 mod. 13 infantry support guns)
    - Mortar Company (81mm mod. 35 mortars)
  - 58th Infantry Regiment "Piave", (Note: Named 58th Infantry Regiment "Abruzzi" until 1939 when the army reorganized its divisions as binary divisions and divisional infantry regiments took the name of the division.) in Padua
    - Command Company
    - 3 × Fusilier battalions
    - Support Weapons Battery (65/17 mod. 13 infantry support guns)
    - Mortar Company (81mm mod. 35 mortars)
  - 20th Artillery Regiment "Piave", in Padua
    - Command Unit
    - I Group (100/17 mod. 14 howitzers)
    - II Group (100/17 mod. 14 howitzers; joined the regiment on 30 July 1941)
    - II Group (75/27 mod. 11 field guns; renumbered III Group on 30 July 1941)
    - III Group (75/27 mod. 11 field guns; renumbered IV Group on 30 July 1941)
    - XII Mixed Anti-aircraft Group (joined the regiment on 30 July 1941, disbanded October 1941; replaced by the LXXIX Anti-aircraft Artillery Group)
      - 2 × Batteries (75/27 C.K. anti-aircraft guns on Lancia 1Z trucks)
    - 310th Anti-aircraft Battery (20/65 mod. 35 anti-aircraft guns; assigned to the XII Mixed Anti-aircraft Group from 30 July 1941 to October 1941)
    - 220th Anti-tank Battery (47/32 mod. 35 anti-tank guns; joined the regiment on 30 July 1941)
    - Ammunition and Supply Unit
  - X Mortar Battalion (81mm mod. 35 mortars; became the X Heavy Weapons/Anti-tank Battalion in July 1941)
  - 10th Anti-tank Company (47/32 mod. 35 anti-tank gun]; entered the X Anti-tank Battalion in July 1941)
  - 10th Telegraph and Radio Operators Company (entered the CX Mixed Engineer Battalion in July 1941)
  - 42nd Engineer Company (entered the CX Mixed Engineer Battalion in July 1941)
  - 117th Medical Section
    - 816th Field Hospital
    - 817th Field Hospital
    - 1× Surgical Unit
  - 22nd Supply Section (replaced by the 14th Supply Section, when the division was reorganized as a motorized division)
  - 10th Autocarrette Section
  - 810th Transport Section (replaced by the 220th Transport Section, when the division was reorganized as a motorized division)

During its reorganization as fully motorized division the Piave was augmented between 21 June and 15 July 1941 with the following units:

- X Heavy Weapons/Anti-tank Battalion
- CX Mixed Engineer Battalion
- IX Infantry Replacements Battalion (attached)
- X Infantry Replacements Battalion (attached)
- 10th Armored Reconnaissance Squadron (L6/40 tanks)
- 108th Bersaglieri Motorcyclists Company

In November 1941 the two infantry replacement battalions entered the newly formed 10th Infantry Replacements Grouping and the division received an anti-aircraft artillery group:

- LXXIX Anti-aircraft Artillery Group (formed by the 1st Anti-aircraft Artillery Regiment, attached from November 1941 to October 1942)

In October 1942 the division received one more unit:

- 236th Transport Section

In 1943 the division received two more units:

- DVII Anti-aircraft Group (90/53 anti-aircraft guns mounted on Breda 52 trucks)
- DLX Self-propelled Group (Semovente da 75/18 (on M14/41 chassis) self-propelled guns)

== Commanding officers ==
The division's commanding officers were:

10th Infantry Division "Piave":

- Generale di Divisione Francesco Zingales (1938 - 31 October 1939)
- Generale di Divisione Ercole Roncaglia (1 November 1939 - 14 July 1942)

10th Motorized Division "Piave":

- Generale di Divisione Ercole Roncaglia (15 July 1942 - 8 October 1942)
- Generale di Brigata Guido Bologna (acting, 9 October 1942 - 27 October 1942)
- Generale di Brigata Ugo Tabellini (28 October 1942 - 23 September 1943)
