= Șimand =

Romanian commune

- Commune
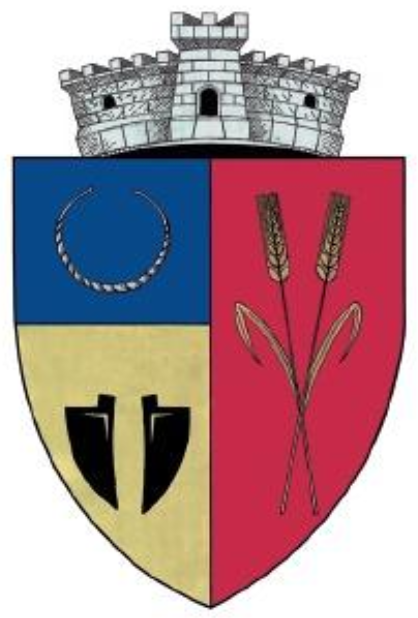
- Coat of arms

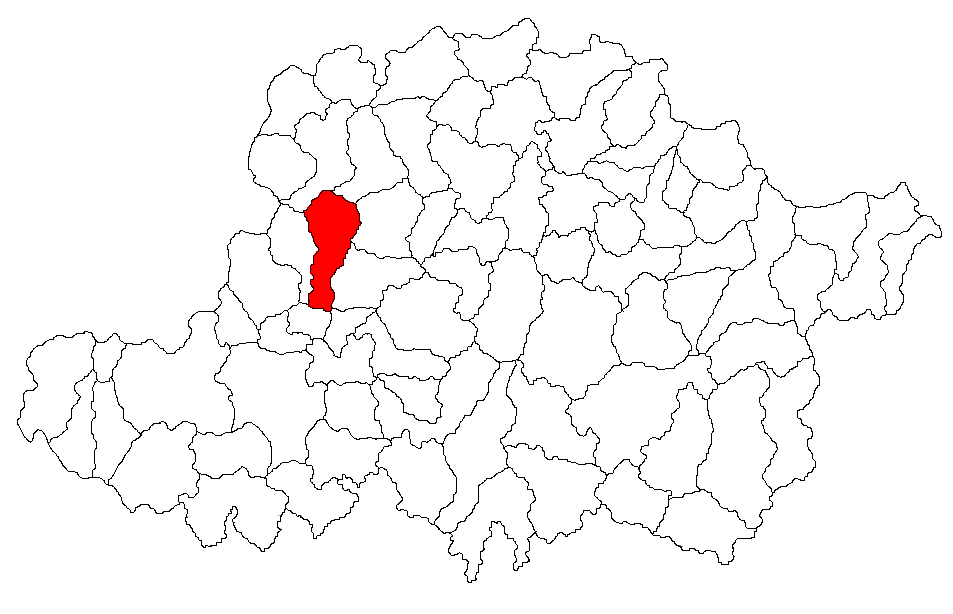
- Location in Arad County

- Location in Romania
- Coordinates: 46°26′N 21°27′E
- Country: Romania
- County: Arad

Government
  - Mayor (2020–2024): Florin-Liviu Dema (PNL)
- Area: 100.28 km^{2} (38.72 sq mi)
- Elevation: 94 m (308 ft)
- Population (2021-12-01): 3,876
  - Density: 38.65/km^{2} (100.1/sq mi)
- Time zone: UTC+02:00 (EET)
  - Summer (DST): UTC+03:00 (EEST)
- Postal code: 317335
- Area code: (+40) 0257
- Vehicle reg.: AR
- Website: simand.ro

Șimand (Hungarian: Simánd) is a commune in Arad County, Romania. It is situated in the contact zone of the Arad and Criș Plateaus, on the Canalul Morilor and stretches over 10,028 ha (24,780 acres). It is composed of a single village, Șimand, situated at 30 km (19 mi) from the county seat, Arad.

== Population ==
Historical population
Year	Pop.	±%
1880	4,030	—
1910	5,228	+29.7%
1930	4,693	−10.2%
1977	4,657	−0.8%
1992	4,039	−13.3%
2002	4,144	+2.6%
2011	3,982	−3.9%
2021	3,876	−2.7%
Source: Census data

According to the 2002 census, the population of the commune counted 4,144 inhabitants; of those, 87.2% were Romanians, 4.8% Hungarians, 7.0% Roma, 0.9% Germans, and 0.1% of other or undeclared nationalities. At the 2021 census, Șimand had a population of 3,876, of which 77% were Romanians, 9.86% Roma, and 2.04% Hungarians.

== History ==
The first documentary record of the locality Șimand dates back to 1290, although traces of inhabitance of the commune's territory date from older times. A necropolis originating from the 1st century B.C.-the 1st century A.D. has been excavated here in which amber ornaments, lead mirrors and a Dacian ceramic pot have been found.

== Economy ==
Agriculture is the main economic branch of the commune, farming, vegetable growing, and livestock-breeding are the most important activities.
