= Monte Romano =

- Comune
- Comune di Monte Romano
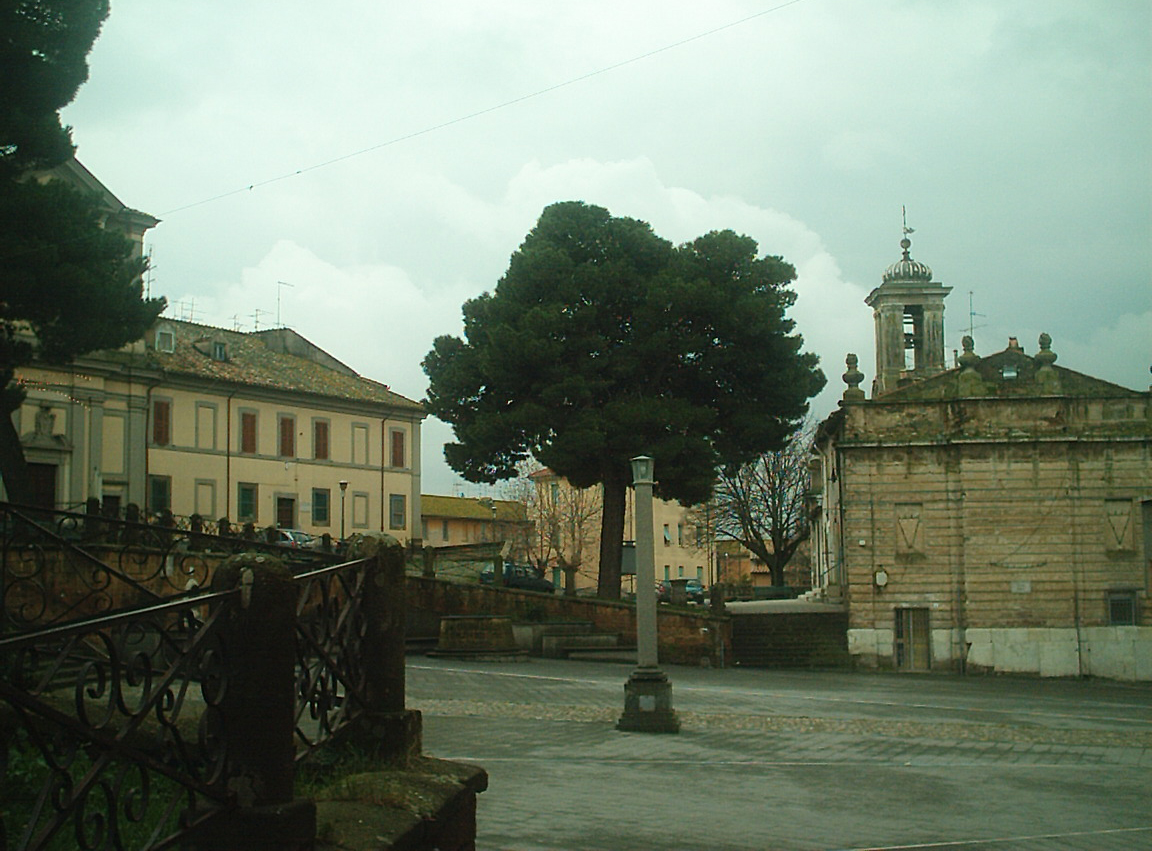

- Coat of arms

- Location within Italy Location within Lazio
- Coordinates: 42°16′N 11°53′E
- Country: Italy
- Region: Lazio
- Province: Viterbo (VT)
- Frazioni: Roccarespampani

Government
  - Mayor: Maurizio Testa

Area
  - Total: 86.14 km^{2} (33.26 sq mi)
- Elevation: 230 m (750 ft)

Population (30 November 2017)
  - Total: 1,964
  - Density: 22.80/km^{2} (59.05/sq mi)
- Demonym: Monteromanesi
- Time zone: UTC+1 (CET)
  - Summer (DST): UTC+2 (CEST)
- Postal code: 01010
- Dialing code: 0766
- Patron saint: St. Corona
- Saint day: May 14
- Website: Official website

Monte Romano (Monteromanese: Montromano) is a comune (municipality) in the Province of Viterbo in the Italian region of Latium, located about 60 km (37 mi) northwest of Rome and about 25 km (16 mi) southwest of Viterbo.

== Main sights ==
- Civic Tower (or Watch Tower)
- Fontana del Mascherone ("Big Mask Fountain")
- Church of the Santo Spirito
- 17th-century castle of Roccarespampani
