= 105th Infantry Division "Rovigo" =

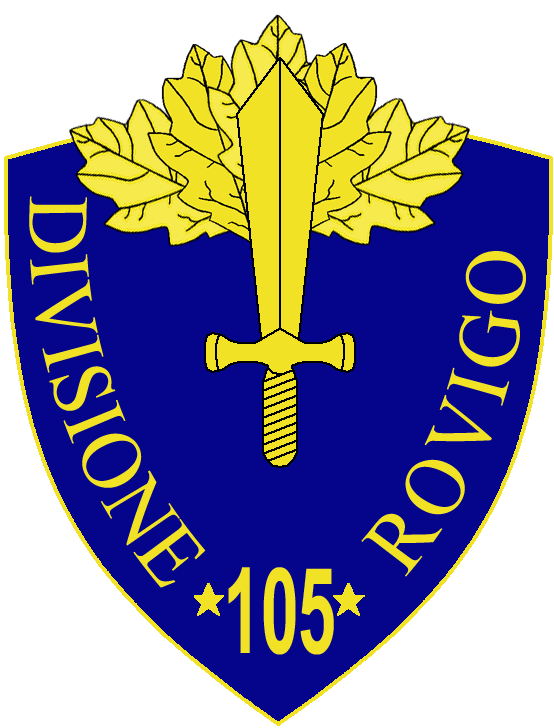
- 105th Infantry Division "Rovigo" insignia
- Active: 15 March 1942– 9 September 1943
- Country: Kingdom of Italy
- Branch: Royal Italian Army
- Type: Infantry
- Size: Division
- Engagements: World War II

Insignia
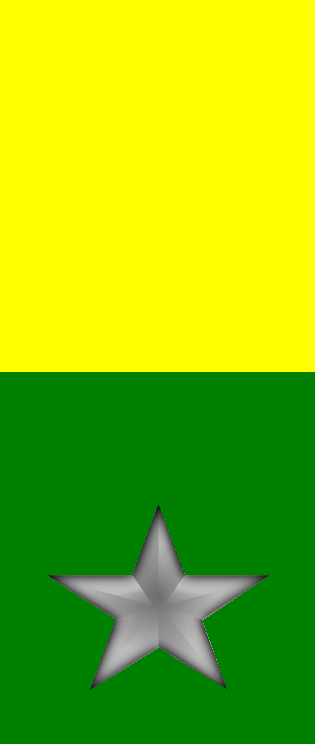
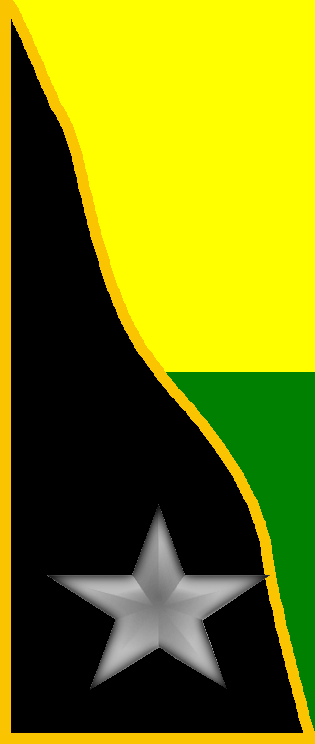
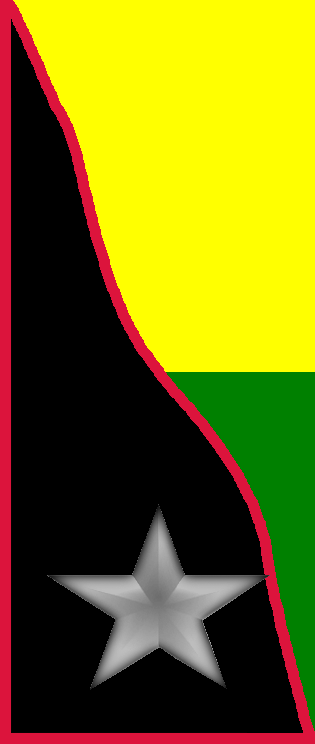
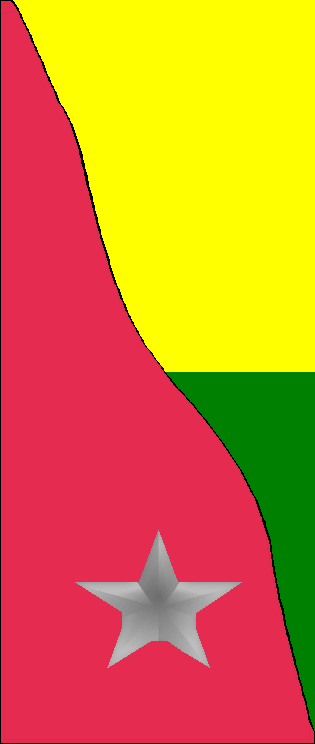
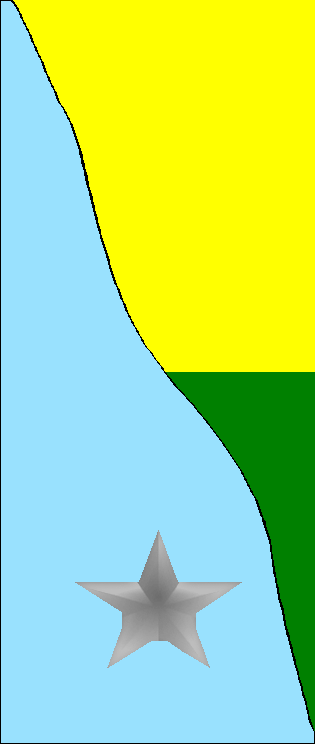
- Identification symbol: Rovigo Division gorget patches

The 105th Infantry Division "Rovigo" (Italian: 105ª Divisione di fanteria "Rovigo") was an infantry division of the Royal Italian Army during World War II. The Rovigo was named for the city of Rovigo and classified as an auto-transportable division, meaning it had some motorized transport, but not enough to move the entire division at once.

== History ==
=== World War I ===
The division's lineage begins with the Brigade "Rovigo" raised on 20 May 1916 with the 227th and 228th infantry regiments. The brigade fought on the Italian front in World War I and was disbanded on 15 November 1917 after it had been overrun during the Battle of Caporetto.

=== World War II ===
The 105th Infantry Division "Rovigo" was activated in Padua on 15 March 1942 and consisted of the 227th and 228th infantry regiments, and the 117th Artillery Regiment. As a division raised during the war the Rovigo did not have its own regimental depots and therefore its regiments were raised by the depots of the 10th Motorized Division "Piave": the 227th Infantry Regiment "Rovigo" was raised in Vicenza on 5 January 1942 by the 57th Motorized Regiment "Piave" and the 228th Infantry Regiment "Rovigo" was raised in Padua on 1 January 1942 by the 58th Motorized Regiment "Piave", while the 117th Artillery Regiment "Rovigo" was raised in Novara by the depot of the 17th Artillery Regiment "Sforzesca".

In June 1942 the division moved its units to Southern Piedmont and then in November 1942 to Liguria after XXII Army Corps and its units guarding the Ligurian coast had participated in the occupation of Southern France and remained there as occupation force. In Liguria the Rovigo formed the mobile reserve behind the 201st Coastal Division in the area of Ventimiglia, Sanremo, Imperia, Albenga, and Loano, from where the task of mobile reserve was continued by the 103rd Infantry Division "Piacenza". After the Armistice of Cassibile was announced on 8 September 1943 the division disintegrated and its remnants were dissolved by the invading Germans on 9 September.

== Organization ==
105th Motorized Division "Rovigo" organization in 1943

- 105th Infantry Division "Rovigo"
  - Headquarters
    - Command Company
    - 152nd Carabinieri Section
    - 153rd Carabinieri Section
    - 105th Field Post Office
    - 105th Infantry Division Command Transport Squad
  - 227th Infantry Regiment "Rovigo"
    - Command Company
    - 3 × Fusilier battalions
    - Cannons Company (47/32 mod. 35 anti-tank guns)
    - Mortar Company (81mm mod. 35 mortars)
  - 228th Infantry Regiment "Rovigo"
    - Command Company
    - 3 × Fusilier battalions
    - Cannons Company (47/32 mod. 35 anti-tank guns)
    - Mortar Company (81mm mod. 35 mortars)
  - 117th Artillery Regiment "Rovigo"
    - Command Unit
    - I Group (100/17 mod. 14 howitzers; re-equipped with 100/22 mod. 14/19 howitzers in October 1942)
    - II Group (75/27 mod. 11 field guns)
    - III Group (75/13 mod. 15 mountain guns; transferred from the 159th Artillery Regiment "Veneto" on 7 May 1942)
    - IV Group (75/13 mod. 15 mountain guns; transferred from the 159th Artillery Regiment "Veneto" on 7 May 1942)
    - 362nd Anti-aircraft Battery (20/65 mod. 35 anti-aircraft guns, formed on 12 January 1943)
    - Ammunition and Supply Unit
  - 117th Artillery Regiment "Rovigo" (after being reorganized in June 1943)
    - Command Unit
    - I Group (100/22 mod. 14/19 howitzers)
    - II Group (100/22 mod. 14/19 howitzers)
    - III Group (75/18 mod. 34 howitzers)
    - IV Group (75/18 mod. 34 howitzers)
    - 362nd Anti-aircraft Battery (20/65 mod. 35 anti-aircraft guns)
    - Ammunition and Supply Unit
  - CCV Mortar Battalion (81mm mod. 35 mortars; joined the division in October 1942)
  - 305th Anti-tank Company (47/32 mod. 35 anti-tank guns)
  - 80th Engineer Company
  - 150th Telegraph and Radio Operators Company
  - 105th Medical Section
    - 2 × Field hospitals
    - 1 × Surgical unit
  - 106th Supply Section
  - Transport Section

== Commanding officers ==
The division's commanding officers were:

- Generale di Brigata Ottorino Battista Dabbeni (15 March 1942 - 14 September 1942)
- Generale di Divisione Pietro Belletti (15 September 1942 - 9 October 1942)
- Generale di Brigata Emilio Rovida (10 October 1942 - 9 September 1943
