= Ercole Roncaglia =

Italian general (1886–1965)

- Born: 5 March 1886; Modena, Kingdom of Italy
- Died: 1965 (aged 79); Modena, Italy
- Military career
- Allegiance: Kingdom of Italy
- Branch: Royal Italian Army
- Rank: Lieutenant General
- Commands: 22nd Artillery Regiment "Aosta"; 4th Automobile Center; 10th Infantry Division "Piave"; XIV Army Corps
- Conflicts: World War I; Battle of Vittorio Veneto; World War II; North African campaign; Yugoslav Front; Operation Schwarz; Operation Achse
- Awards: Bronze Medal of Military Valor; War Cross for Military Valor; Military Order of Italy

Ercole Roncaglia (5 March 1886 – 1965) was an Italian general during World War II.

== Biography ==
Roncaglia was born in Modena on 5 March 1886, into a noble family. After enlisting in the Royal Italian Army he became an artillery officer; he fought in the First World War, initially as captain of a field artillery regiment, and later, after promotion to major and then to lieutenant colonel, in the staff of the 19th Army Corps. By the end of the war he had been awarded a Bronze Medal of Military Valor and a War Cross for Military Valor. After promotion to colonel, he was appointed commander of the 22nd Artillery Regiment "Aosta", stationed in Palermo, and then of the 4th Automobile Center from 1933 to 1936. Having become a brigadier general on 1 July 1937, he was given command of the artillery of the Turin Army Corps, then of the artillery of the Bologna Army Corps and then of the Frontier Guard of the XIV Army Corps in Treviso. On 1 November 1939 he assumed command of the 10th Infantry Division "Piave", stationed in Padua, being promoted to major general on 1 January 1940.

When Italy entered the Second World War, on 10 June 1940, Roncaglia was still in command of the "Piave" Division, stationed between Padua, Vicenza and Treviso. He remained in command of the division (except for a brief period in 1941, during which he was interim commander of the Special Army Corps), of which he supervised the redeployment in Sicily and then the transformation into a motorized unit, until October 15, 1942, when he was appointed Military Commander of Tripolitania. He remained in Italian North Africa until January 23, 1943, when he returned to Italy following the final loss of Tripolitania. He was temporarily placed at the disposal of the Ministry of War in Rome until May 1943; when he was given command of the XIV Corps (consisting of four Italian and one German infantry division, altogether 55,800 men), with headquarters in Podgorica (Montenegro). In May 1943 he clashed with Walter Stettner Ritter von Grabenhofen over the disarmament of Chetnik units, carried out by the Germans but opposed by the Italians, who had been allied with the Chetniks against the Yugoslav People's Liberation Army; he unsuccessfully demanded the release of Pavle Đurišić, who had been arrested by the Germans, and ordered his men to prevent the Germans from continuing the disarmament of Chetniks even by force, if this was not stopped. On 1 July 1943 he was promoted to lieutenant general. On 15 September 1943 he was captured by German forces in Podgorica after the proclamation of the armistice of Cassibile; he was then held as a prisoner of war in Oflag 64/Z in Schokken, Poland, until January 1945, when he was freed by the advancing Red Army. After the war he was included by Yugoslavia in a list of officers accused of war crimes, but was not prosecuted. On 13 May 1948 he was awarded the Knight's Cross of the Military Order of Italy. He died in his native Modena in 1965.
