= Italian Expeditionary Corps in Russia order of battle =

During World War II, the Italian Expeditionary Corps in Russia (CSIR) was a corps of the Regio Esercito that fought on the Eastern Front. In July 1942 the CSIR entered the newly formed Italian Army in Russia as XXXV Army Corps. On 1 August 1941 the CSIR consisted of the following units:

== Italian Expeditionary Corps in Russia ==
- Italian Expeditionary Corps in Russia, Commander: Army Corps General Francesco Zingales (until 13 July 1941), Army Corps General Giovanni Messe (from 16 July 1941)
  - Army Corps Headquarters, Chief of Staff: Colonel Guido Piacenza
    - 33rd Topographic Section
    - 33rd Artillery Topographic Section
    - 33rd Photographic Section
    - 193rd Motorized Royal Carabinieri Section
    - 194th Motorized Royal Carabinieri Section
    - 684th Motorized Royal Carabinieri Section
    - 1st Fuel Section
    - Army Corps Command Automobilistic Squad
    - Photo-cinematographic Unit
    - 13th Road Movement Squad
    - 88th Military Post Office
  - Artillery Commander: Brigadier General Francesco Dupont
    - 30th Army Corps Artillery Grouping, Commander: Colonel Lorenzo Matiotti
      - IV Motorized Anti-aircraft Group (75/46 anti-aircraft cannons)
      - XIX Motorized Anti-aircraft Group (75/46 anti-aircraft cannons)
      - LX Cannons Group (105/32 heavy field guns)
      - LXI Cannons Group (105/32 heavy field guns)
      - LXII Cannons Group (105/32 heavy field guns)
      - 95th Light Anti-aircraft Battery (20/65 anti-aircraft guns)
      - 97th Light Anti-aircraft Battery (20/65 anti-aircraft guns)
  - Engineer Commander: Colonel Mario Tirelli
    - I Chemical Battalion
    - I Pontieri Battalion
    - IV Engineer Battalion
    - VIII Mixed Connections Battalion
      - 102nd Radio Officers Company
      - 121st Telegraphers Company
      - 122nd Telegraphers Company
      - 20th Mobile Dovecote
    - IX Pontieri Battalion
    - 88th Auto-transported Photo-electricians Section
    - 19th Auto-transported Connection Materials Workshop
  - 63rd CC.NN. Legione (Regiment) "Tagliamento", Commander Console Niccolò Nicchiarelli
    - LXIII CC.NN. Mountain Coorte (Battalion) "Udine"
    - LXXIX CC.NN. Assault Coorte (Battalion) "Reggio Emilia"
    - LXIII Accompanying Weapons Battalion (Army unit with machine guns and 81mm Mod. 35 mortars)
  - CIV Army Corps Machine Gunners Battalion
  - Skiers Battalion "Monte Cervino" (arrived February 1942)
    - Command Platoon
    - 1st Skiers Company
    - 2nd Skiers Company
    - 80th Support Weapons Company (Machine guns and 81mm Mod. 35 mortars)
  - II Anti-tank Cannons Battalion (47/32 anti-tank cannons)
  - 1st Bersaglieri Motorcyclists Company

=== 3rd Cavalry Division "Principe Amedeo Duca d'Aosta" ===
- 3rd Cavalry Division "Principe Amedeo Duca d'Aosta", Commander: Brigadier General Mario Marazzani
  - Headquarters
    - III Photo-cinematographic Group
    - 355th Motorized Royal Carabinieri Section
    - 356th Motorized Royal Carabinieri Section
    - 3rd Fast Division Command Automobilistic Squad
    - 3rd Road Movement Unit
    - 40th Military Post Office
  - Regiment "Savoia Cavalleria", Commander: Colonel Weiss Poccetti
    - Headquarters and Regiment Headquarters Company
    - I, and II Squadrons Group, each with:
      - Headquarters and Squadrons Group Headquarters Squadron
      - 2x Dragoons squadrons
    - 3rd Machine Gunners Squadron
  - Regiment "Lancieri di Novara", Commander: Colonel Egidio Giusiana
    - Headquarters and Regiment Headquarters Squadron
    - I, and II Squadrons Group, each with:
      - Headquarters and Squadrons Group Headquarters Squadron
      - 2x Lancers squadrons
    - 5th Machine Gunners Squadron
  - 3rd Bersaglieri Regiment, Commander: Colonel Aminto Caretto
    - Headquarters and Regiment Headquarters Company
    - XVIII, XX, and XXV Auto-transported Bersaglieri Battalion, each with:
      - Headquarters and Battalion Headquarters Company
      - 3x Bersaglieri companies
      - Support Weapons Company (Machine guns and 81mm Mod. 35 mortars)
    - XIII "Cavalleggeri di Alessandria" Self-propelled Group (arrived August 1942)
      - Headquarters and Group Headquarters Squadron
      - 2x Self-propelled squadrons (47/32 self-propelled guns)
    - 2nd Bersaglieri Motorcyclists Company
    - 3rd Bersaglieri Motorcyclists Company
    - 122nd Light Transport Unit
  - 3rd Horse Artillery Regiment, Commander: Colonel Cesare Colombo
    - Headquarters and Regiment Headquarters Unit
    - I Horse-drawn Group (75/27 Mod. 12 field guns)
    - II Horse-drawn Group (75/27 Mod. 12 field guns)
    - III Horse-drawn Group (75/27 Mod. 12 field guns)
    - Ammunition and Food Unit
  - III Fast Tanks Group "San Giorgio"
    - Headquarters and Group Headquarters Company
    - 2x Tank Companies (L3/35 tankettes)
  - 172nd Anti-tank Cannons Company (47/32 anti-tank cannons)
  - 173rd Anti-tank Cannons Company (47/32 anti-tank cannons)
  - 93rd Light Anti-aircraft Battery (20/65 anti-aircraft guns)
  - 101st Light Anti-aircraft Battery (20/65 anti-aircraft guns)
  - 103rd Telegraphers and Radio-telegraphers Engineer Company
  - 105th Sappers Engineer Company
  - 73rd Medical Section
    - 46th Field Hospital
    - 47th Field Hospital
    - 148th Field Hospital
    - 159th Field Hospital
  - 20th Chirurgical Squad
  - 93rd Supply Section
  - 59th Bakers Squad
  - 3rd Car Repair Workshop
  - 213th Mixed Transport Unit

==== Reorganization March 1942 ====
In March 1942 the division was reorganized: both cavalry regiments left the division and formed the Mounted Grouping under direct command of the CSIR, while the 3rd Horse Artillery Regiment came under direct command of the CSIR's Artillery Commander. The units were replaced in the division by the following units

- 6th Bersaglieri Regiment, Commander: Colonel Umberto Salvatores:
  - Headquarters and Regiment Headquarters Company
  - VI, XIII, and XIX Auto-transported Bersaglieri Battalion, each with:
    - Headquarters and Battalion Headquarters Company
    - 3x Bersaglieri companies
    - Support Weapons Company (Machine guns and 81mm Mod. 35 mortars)
- 120th Motorized Artillery Regiment, Commander: Colonel Ugo de Simone
  - Headquarters and Regiment Headquarters Unit
  - I Motorized Group (100/17 field guns)
  - II Motorized Group (75/27 field guns)
  - III Motorized Group (75/27 field guns)
  - Ammunition and Food Unit
- XLVII Bersaglieri Motorcyclists Battalion
  - Headquarters and Battalion Headquarters Company
  - 3x Bersaglieri motorcyclists companies
- LXVII Armored Bersaglieri Battalion (arrived early summer 1942)
  - Headquarters and Battalion Headquarters Company
  - 2x Tank Companies (L6/40 tanks)
- Divisional Mortar Battalion
  - Headquarters and Battalion Headquarters Company
  - 3x Mortar companies (81mm Mod. 35 mortars))
- 75th Anti-tank Cannons Battery (75/39 anti-tank cannons)
- 272nd Anti-tank Cannons Company (47/32 anti-tank cannons)
- XIV Heavy Transport Group
  - 218th Heavy Transport Unit
  - 219th Heavy Transport Unit

=== 9th Infantry Division "Pasubio" ===
The 9th Infantry Division "Pasubio" was an auto-transportable division, which had motorized artillery and support units, while its infantry continued to transport equipment on mules or with carriages.

- 9th Infantry Division "Pasubio", Commander: Division General Vittorio Giovanelli
  - Headquarters
    - I Photo-cinematographic Group
    - 25th Motorized Royal Carabinieri Section
    - 26th Motorized Royal Carabinieri Section
    - 91st Fuel Section
    - 9th Infantry Division Command Automobilistic Squad
    - 8th Road Movement Squad
    - 9th Road Rescue Squad
    - 83rd Military Post Office
  - 79th Infantry Regiment "Pasubio", Commander: Colonel Rocco Blasioli
    - Headquarters and Regiment Headquarters Company
    - Mortar Company (81mm Mod. 35 mortars)
    - Accompanying Cannons Battery (65/17 mountain guns)
    - I, II, and III Infantry Battalion, each with:
      - Headquarters and Battalion Headquarters Company
      - 3x Fusiliers companies
      - Support Weapons Company (Machine guns and 45mm Mod. 35 mortars)
  - 80th Infantry Regiment "Pasubio", Commander: Colonel Epifanio Chiaramonti
    - Headquarters and Regiment Headquarters Company
    - Mortar Company (81mm Mod. 35 mortars)
    - Accompanying Cannons Battery (65/17 mountain guns)
    - I, II, and III Infantry Battalion, each with:
      - Headquarters and Battalion Headquarters Company
      - 3x Fusiliers companies
      - Support Weapons Company (Machine guns and 45mm Mod. 35 mortars)
  - 8th Artillery Regiment "Pasubio", Commander: Colonel Alfredo Reginella
    - Headquarters and Regiment Headquarters Unit
    - I Motorized Group (100/17 field guns)
    - II Motorized Group (75/27 field guns)
    - III Motorized Group (75/27 field guns)
    - Ammunition and Food Unit
  - V Mortar Battalion (81mm Mod. 35 mortars)
  - IX Mortar Battalion (81mm Mod. 35 mortars)
  - 9th Anti-tank Cannons Company (47/32 anti-tank cannons)
  - 141st Anti-tank Cannons Company (47/32 anti-tank cannons)
  - 85th Light Anti-aircraft Battery (20/65 anti-aircraft guns)
  - 309th Light Anti-aircraft Battery (20/65 anti-aircraft guns)
  - 9th Telegraphers and Radio-telegraphers Engineer Company
  - 30th Sappers Engineer Company
  - 95th Photo-electricians Section
  - 5th Medical Section
    - 825th Field Hospital
    - 826th Field Hospital
    - 836th Field Hospital
    - 874th Field Hospital
  - 25th Chirurgical Squad
  - 11th Supply Section
  - 26th Bakers Squad
  - 9th Car Repair Workshop

=== 52nd Infantry Division "Torino" ===
The 52nd Infantry Division "Torino" was an auto-transportable division, which had motorized artillery and support units, while its infantry continued to transport equipment on mules or with carriages.

- 52nd Infantry Division "Torino", Commander: Division General Luigi Manzi
  - Headquarters
    - II Photo-cinematographic Group
    - 56th Motorized Royal Carabinieri Section
    - 66th Motorized Royal Carabinieri Section
    - 52nd Fuel Section
    - 52nd Infantry Division Command Automobilistic Squad
    - 5th Road Movement Squad
    - 52nd Road Rescue Squad
    - 152nd Military Post Office
  - 81st Infantry Regiment "Torino", Commander: Colonel Carlo Piccinini
    - Headquarters and Regiment Headquarters Company
    - Mortar Company (81mm Mod. 35 mortars)
    - Accompanying Cannons Battery (65/17 mountain guns)
    - I, II, and III Infantry Battalion, each with:
      - Headquarters and Battalion Headquarters Company
      - 3x Fusiliers companies
      - Support Weapons Company (Machine guns and 45mm Mod. 35 mortars)
  - 82nd Infantry Regiment "Torino", Commander: Colonel Evaristo Fioravanti
    - Headquarters and Regiment Headquarters Company
    - Mortar Company (81mm Mod. 35 mortars)
    - Accompanying Cannons Battery (65/17 mountain guns)
    - I, II, and III Infantry Battalion, each with:
      - Headquarters and Battalion Headquarters Company
      - 3x Fusiliers companies
      - Support Weapons Company (Machine guns and 45mm Mod. 35 mortars)
  - 52nd Artillery Regiment "Torino", Commander: Colonel Giuseppe Ghiringhelli
    - Headquarters and Regiment Headquarters Unit
    - I Motorized Group (100/17 field guns)
    - II Motorized Group (75/27 field guns)
    - III Motorized Group (75/27 field guns)
    - Ammunition and Food Unit
  - XXVI Mortar Battalion (81mm Mod. 35 mortars)
  - LII Mortar Battalion (81mm Mod. 35 mortars)
  - 52nd Anti-tank Cannons Company (47/32 anti-tank cannons)
  - 171st Anti-tank Cannons Company (47/32 anti-tank cannons)
  - 352nd Light Anti-aircraft Battery (20/65 anti-aircraft guns)
  - 361st Light Anti-aircraft Battery (20/65 anti-aircraft guns)
  - 52nd Telegraphers and Radiotelegraphers Engineer Company
  - 57th Sappers Engineer Company
  - 69th Photo-electricians Section
  - 52nd Medical Section
    - 89th Field Hospital
    - 90th Field Hospital
    - 117th Field Hospital
    - 578th Field Hospital
  - 52nd Chirurgical Squad
  - 52nd Supply Section
  - 65th Bakers Squad
  - 52nd Car Repair Workshop

=== CSIR Aviation Command ===
The Regia Aeronautica dispatched the following units to Russia:

- CSIR Aviation Command, Commander: Colonel Carlo Drago
  - 61st Observation Group
    - 34th Observation Squadron (Ca.311 reconnaissance aircraft)
    - 119th Observation Squadron (Ca.311 reconnaissance aircraft)
    - 128th Observation Squadron (Ca.311 reconnaissance aircraft)
  - 22nd Fighter Group
    - 359th Fighter Squadron (MC.200 fighter aircraft)
    - 362nd Fighter Squadron (MC.200 fighter aircraft)
    - 369th Fighter Squadron (MC.200 fighter aircraft)
    - 371st Fighter Squadron (MC.200 fighter aircraft)
  - 245th Transport Squadron (SM.81 transport aircraft)
  - 246th Transport Squadron (SM.81 transport aircraft)
  - 1st, 2nd, 3rd, 4th, 5th, and 6th Airport Defense Section ((20/65 anti-aircraft guns))
  - Car Park, with around 300 vehicles

=== Logistic Services ===
The following logistic and support units were attached to the corps:

- 2nd Army Transport Grouping, Commander: Colonel Ginesio Ninchi
  - II Mixed Transport Group
    - 26th Heavy Transport Unit
    - 32nd Heavy Transport Unit
    - 51st Ambulances Transport Unit
    - 91st Heavy Transport Unit
    - 116th Light Transport Unit
    - 228th Mixed Transport Unit
  - XXIX Heavy Transport Group
    - 33rd Heavy Transport Unit
    - 34th Heavy Transport Unit
    - 96th Heavy Transport Unit
    - 97th Heavy Transport Unit
- 14th Medical Section
  - Field Hospitals: 60th, 64th, 163rd, 164th, 235th, 238th, 239th, 256th, 257th, 820th, 827th, 828th, 829th, 830th, 831st, 837th, 838th, 873rd
- 2nd Disinfection Section
- 25th Disinfection Section
- 2nd Gas Victims Recovery Section
- 104th Gas Victims Recovery Section
- 1st Radiological Ambulance
- 2nd Radiological Ambulance
- 14th Dentistry Ambulance
- Chemical, Bacteriological, Toxicological Laboratory
- 2nd Quadruped Infirmary
- 6th Quadruped Infirmary
- 19th Bakers Section
- 87th Supply Section
- 23rd Bakers Squad
- 82nd Quartermaster Unit
- 15th Transport Group Workshop
- 13th Road Rescue Unit
- 8th Road Rescue Squad
