= Verson (disambiguation) =

Verson is a commune in Basse-Normandie, France.

Verson may also refer to:

- Verson Allsteel Press Co., defunct American machine tool manufacturer
- Enrico Verson (1845–1927), Italian entomologist
- Kim Verson (born 1993), Croatian singer
