= Battle of Flondar =

First World War battle between Austrian and Italian forces

- Part of the Italian Front of World War I
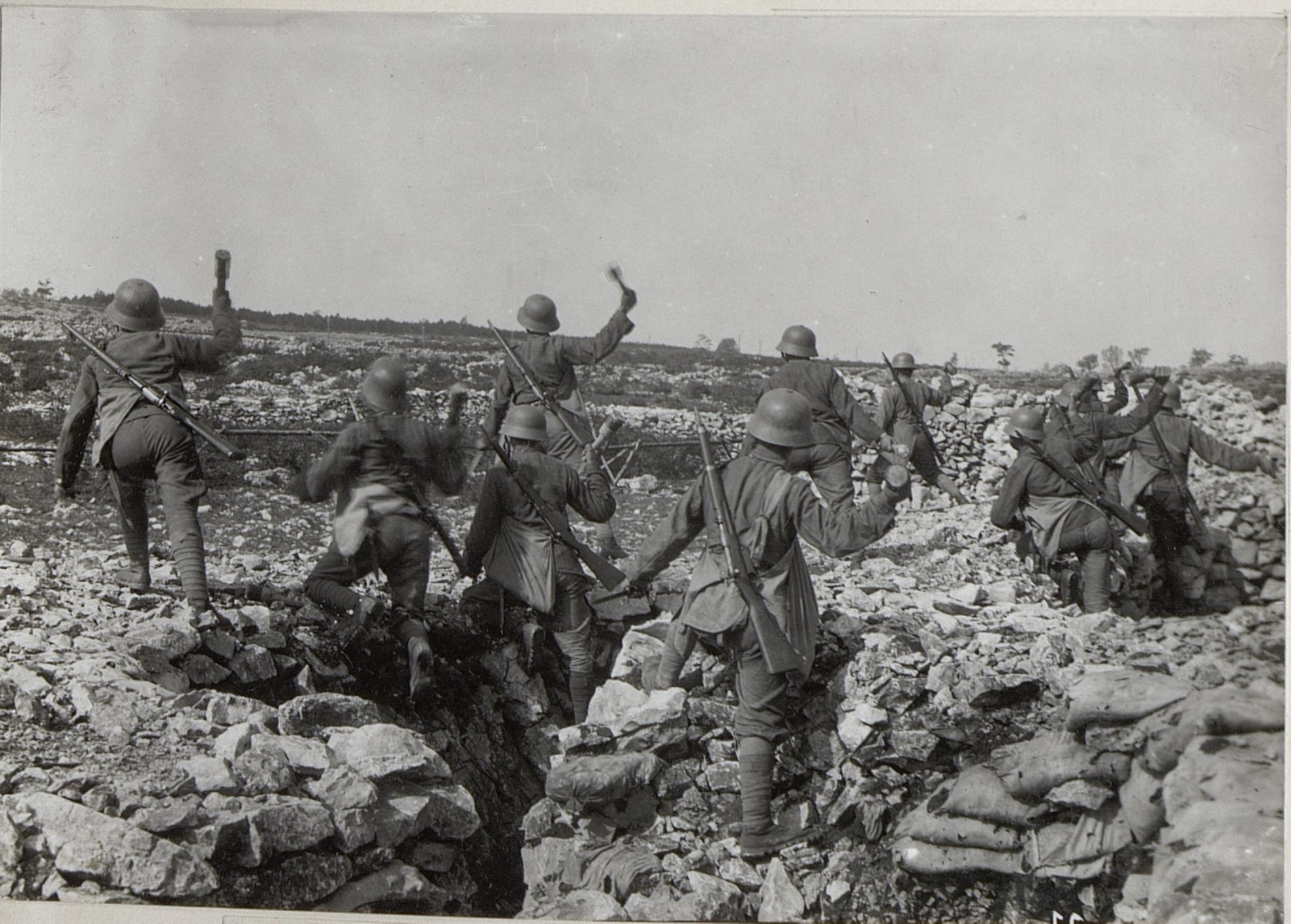
- Austrian assault troops on the Isonzo front in September 1917.
Date	3 – 6 June 1917
Location	Monte Ermada, Italy
Result	Austro-Hungarian victory

Belligerents
Italy	Austria-Hungary

Commanders and leaders
(Kingdom of Italy) Prince Emanuele Filiberto	(Austria-Hungary) Svetozar Boroević

Casualties and losses
1,400 killed 7,900 wounded 12,500 prisoners and missing	7,500 killed and wounded

The Battle of Flondar, also known as the defeat of Flondar (from the name of the most important hill reconquered by the Austro-Hungarians) took place during the First World War, consisting of a counterattack launched by selected Austrian units under the command of General Svetozar Borojević against the Italian positions around the Monte Ermada. Although outnumbered, the Austro-Hungarians surprised the Italian defenses and, using new assault tactics, managed to reconquer some important positions, thus giving relief to their front lines.

The defeat, albeit tactically limited, which cost heavy losses, including around 10,000 prisoners, to the Royal Army and around 7,500 to the Austro-Hungarians, was deplored by the Italian high command, which had underestimated the tactical innovations introduced by the Austrians, and instead held responsible an alleged moral weakness of the troops.

== Strategic situation on the Italian front ==
On the evening of 26 May 1917, General Luigi Cadorna, Chief of the General Staff of the Royal Army, had decided to interrupt the fighting in progress since 12 May in the Karst and Isonzo sectors of the Italian front, putting an end to the so-called Tenth Battle of the Isonzo, the new great offensive launched to finally reach decisive strategic objectives.

General Cadorna had employed a total force of approximately 700,000 men deployed from the Gorizia area in the north to the sea in the south; but, despite this great commitment of men and means, the results achieved were once again limited and inconclusive. Some important positions had been conquered, in particular in the northern sector the Mount Kuk and Vadiče massifs had fallen and the Plava bridgehead had been enlarged. But the Holy Mountain of Gorizia, from which the city of the same name could be more easily controlled, remained in enemy hands. In the Carso sector the Italian troops had gained ground approaching Monte Ermada. These tactical results had been achieved only after exhausting and bloody fighting that had decimated many Italian formations; at the end of the battle the losses amounted to 13,300 dead, 74,000 wounded and 24,500 missing and prisoners; the troops were exhausted and tired. Commander of the Austro-Hungarian forces on the Isonzo and the Karst

The Austro-Hungarian Army had once again demonstrated combativeness and tactical ability, managing to maintain the most important positions and inflicting heavy losses on the enemy; however, the Austro-Hungarian troops had also suffered greatly during the fierce fighting on impervious and inhospitable terrain and had suffered the loss of 7,300 dead, 45,000 wounded and 23,400 missing and prisoners. From a strategic point of view, at the end of the tenth battle, what was especially worrying for the Austro-Hungarians was the situation of the defenses of Monte Ermada, which were now only 2.5 km away from the positions reached by the Italian troops; it was feared that the fall of that important fortified system could open the road to Trieste and undermine the solidity of the entire left wing of the Austro-Hungarian deployment. On May 26, General Alfred von Schenk, commander of the XXIII Army Corps which garrisoned the sector, highlighted these difficulties and proposed to counterattack to reconquer the position of Flondar and gain ground west of Monte Ermada.

At Postomia, headquarters of the 5th Army, General Svetozar Borojević, commander-in-chief of the Isonzo line, fully agreed with his subordinated and already on May 28 the organization of a counter-offensive scheduled for June 4 was arranged. To carry out the attack, two operational groups were formed under the direction of General Schneider von Manns-Au, commander of the 28th Infantry Division, with a series of reinforcement units: at Medeazza seven battalions of the XII brigade were grouped together mountain and the 63rd infantry regiment, while at San Giovanni di Duino the 28th Bohemian regiment and part of the 51st regiment were collected; to the north the 19th Infantry Division was deployed to launch a diversionary attack against the Dosso Faiti. the artillery assigned to the counter-offensive was particularly strengthened and, organized into coordinated tactical groups, came under the command of Colonel Janečka.

The plan of the Austrian high command envisaged simulating an attack against the Dosso Faiti, while in reality the real objective should have been the reconquest of positions west of the Monte Ermada, to protect this position of great strategic importance.

The 3rd Italian Army of Prince Emanuele Filiberto, Duke of Aosta, which had conducted most of the attacks and on which the I Group air depended, had emerged heavily tested from the tenth battle of 'Isonzo; however, the high command foresaw an imminent resumption of offensive operations, the positions reached were therefore not organized for defense, they lacked adequate shelters, shelters and obstacles capable of countering any enemy counterattacks. In particular, in the sector of the VII Army Corps, the defenses were weak and consisted mainly of stone walls with frisian horses; only in some places had trenches begun to be dug. The VII Corps was deployed on a line that started from the Fornaza area to the north, where it joined the forces of the XXIII Corps, continued east of the village of Comarie, then on the Flondar ridge at heights 146 and 145, therefore it rested at an altitude of 110 to the west of Medeazza, crossed the Monfalcone-Trieste railway line and concluded to the west of the village of San Giovanni di Duino.

The VII Corps had three divisions to man its sector of the front. To the north, the 16th Infantry Division occupied the village of Comarie and altitude 146 with the Siracusa brigade, and held part of the Trapani brigade in reserve; in the center the 20th Infantry Division deployed most of the Puglie and Ancona brigades from height 146 to the Flondar sector; to the south the 45th Division defended the area between altitude 145 and the Timavo river with the Verona brigade, with a regiment of the Murge brigade in reserve. Some battalions had been placed in precarious conditions inside two railway tunnels located west of the front line. It was a very concentrated deployment which during the battle was an obstacle for the defense; the Italian troops, crowded into narrow spaces, found it difficult to maneuver and, lacking adequate shelter, found themselves exposed to the violent Austrian attacks

== Battle ==
The Austrian counteroffensive began on the morning of 3 June 1917 with an artillery bombardment and a diversionary attack against the sector of the Italian XI Army Corps in the Dosso Faiti sector on the northern flank of the 3rd Army; the Austro-Hungarians initially conquered the position of the hill but were then counterattacked and repelled by the Tiber brigade. In the sector of Fornaza, defended by the XXIII corps, the attacks achieved no results. No major enemy attacks had occurred in the VII Army Corps sector and the situation seemed to be under control; at 9.30 pm, however, the command of the 3rd Army prescribed "active and continuous vigilance to prevent and promptly stop any attempted enemy attack

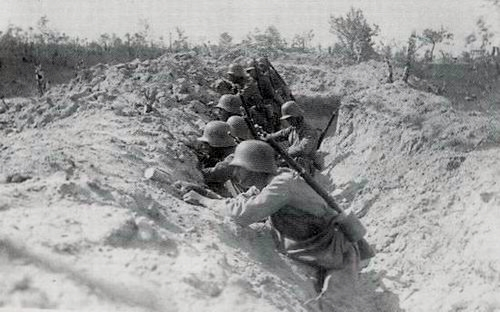
Austrian assault troops (Stosstruppen) in a trench

At 04.00 on 4 June 1917 the Austro-Hungarians suddenly began a violent artillery fire directed against the front line of the VII Corps, the rear areas and the tunnel outlets; the bombing continued for only 40 minutes but caused the interruption of communications between enemy positions, telephone connections failed, while a thick blanket of smoke prevented optical communications. The command action of the VII Army Corps became very difficult. Immediately after the end of the bombardment, the Austro-Hungarian infantry went on the attack, preceded by assault groups (Stosstruppen) tasked with penetrating the lines and infiltrating in depth. Employing a technique used by their German allies, the Austro-Hungarians tried to identify the weakest points of the Italian deployment to concentrate their attacks, without further pursuing more tenaciously defended positions. In this phase, however, the Austrian infantry, attacking immediately, suffered some losses due to the not yet entirely efficient coordination with their own artillery.

The Austrian counteroffensive was conducted by six battalions and achieved some successes by penetrating the connection points between the 16th and 20th Italian Divisions, deployed to the north, and between the 20th and 45th Divisions, which were positioned further south; in particular in this last sector, defended by a battalion of the 71st regiment, which had just arrived in position and lacked solid fortifications, the Austrians managed to advance in depth through the weak defenses, bypassed and conquered height 135, then continued towards the entrance of the northern tunnel of the Trieste-Monfalcone railway. At the same time, other Austrian units marched on the flanks and behind the other two battalions of the 71st regiment, which suffered very high losses and were partly destroyed; 145 altitude was also lost. Brigadier General Fulvio Riccieri, commander of the Puglie brigade, and Colonel Costa, commander of the 71st regiment, were seriously wounded.

The Austro-Hungarian advance endangered the positions of the 4th battalion of the 86th regiment which occupied height 43 and deployed two companies inside the northern tunnel and another two to cover the rolling stock near the railway line. The command of the Verona brigade gave orders to these units to immediately abandon their positions and fall back to heights 36 and 58 to cover the railway, but at 05.30 when the companies inside the tunnel tried to exit, they were blocked by machine gun fire from the Austrians who they had already arrived at the north entrance. Other enemy units reached the southern mouth of the tunnel, isolating the two companies inside which had to surrender; the other two companies deployed in the open, attacked from above with hand grenades and machine guns, also disintegrated; only small groups of soldiers managed to avoid capture and fell back to height 36, together with the remains of the 71st regiment. After having achieved these first objectives, the Austro-Hungarian units continued the counter-offensive successfully. They reached and occupied height 110, blocked the southern tunnel of the railway, where the 2nd battalion of the 86th regiment, some dressing posts and machine gun teams remained isolated, and they also bypassed the 3rd battalion of the same Italian regiment which at 07.00, after having suffered heavy losses and having run out of ammunition, he surrendered to the departments of the 28th Bohemian regiment. Southern. In the hope of help from the outside, these troops blocked the entrances to the tunnel and resisted until 9.30 pm when, after destroying their weapons and documents, they decided to surrender. Previously, on the right of the 86th regiment, between the railway toll booth and the Timavo river, the Austro-Hungarians had managed to outflank two battalions of the 85th regiment which at 08.00 had been forced to surrender. A large part of General Vittorio Zupelli's 20th Division, in particular the Verona and Puglie brigades, was destroyed by these clashes; some senior Italian officers complained about the lack of combativeness of the units and also phenomena of surrender without fighting, but in reality the majority of the units, apart from isolated episodes, fought despite the difficult situation created by the unexpected enemy contract.

At the same time, on 4 June the Austro-Hungarian counter-offensive had also developed further north, at the junction point between the 16th and 20th Italian Division; at 05.30 the attackers had overcome the defenses of the 1st battalion of the 246th regiment belonging to the Siracusa brigade, therefore they occupied height 146. The Austrians continued rapidly and outflanked and routed the 1st and 3rd battalions which partly surrendered, while in a more rearward position, in the valley between altitude 145 and altitude 146, a battalion of the 69th regiment found itself in great difficulty, threatened both from the north and the south by enemy infiltration. The intervention in support of another battalion of the 69th regiment was blocked by the barrage, while the Austrians, after reaching the Flondar-Medeazza road, attacked on the flanks and in the rear; at 06.30 the two Italian battalions, heavily weakened, fell back to an altitude of 69. Further north, after some defensive successes, the Italian units of the left wing of the VII Corps, belonging to the 245th regiment, in turn had to retreat by around 250 meters due to the loss of altitude 146 on the right flank. From altitude 146 the Austrians could also reach altitude 144 with fascist fire and seemed to threaten the area of Lake Doberdò; the Italian commands showed signs of great nervousness; the colonel commanding the 245th regiment moved to the front line with his soldiers, mostly originally from Sicily, to lead the defense; in the end the Austrians did not cross the Flondar line.

== Result ==
At the time of the Austro-Hungarian counterattack, General Cadorna, who had been busy with assignments in Rome since the end of May, was not present at the headquarters in Udine. The first confusing news of the attack reached the high command at 11.00 on 4 June and worried the generals; in his war diary Angelo Gatti reported the impressions of the officers and the rumors about the failure of the departments; he feared that a major enemy offensive was underway with the participation of reinforcements from the eastern front. In the following hours, however, the high command believed that it was only a local counterattack to hinder the Italian offensive plans, even if controversies continued over the alleged insufficient resistance of some units and episodes of poor combativeness. Gatti reports that in particular the soldiers of the Puglie brigade were accused of giving in and failing to resist.

The high command expressed all its discontent and imposed harsh repressive measures to quell alleged phenomena of refusal of obedience and indiscipline; little attention was paid to the actual difficulties and suffering of the troops; equally ignored were the tactical innovations employed by the Austro-Hungarians that had surprised the defenses. General Cadorna returned to the Italian Supreme Military Command of Udine, on which the IV Group air depended, in the early afternoon of 5 June and learned the news of the attack, of the reported episodes of failure and surrender of some departments and the serious losses suffered. In the three days of the Austro-Hungarian counteroffensive the Italians suffered the loss of 1,400 dead, approximately 8,000 wounded and 12,500 prisoners and missing persons. General Cadorna showed great nervousness, recording with disappointment that the Austrians had captured 10,000 prisoners and that at least three regiments, from the Ancona, Puglie and Verona brigades, had not fought and "were taken prisoners unharmed... The commander in chief wrote that due to the government's lack of vigilance, unrest was spreading; he indicated three regiments of Sicilians, "good soldiers but damaged by insurrection", which he would propose to disband. On 6 June he sent a letter to Rome to the Prime Minister Paolo Boselli to illustrate his assessments of the facts; he declared himself worried about the number of prisoners captured by the enemy, once again highlighted the three regiments that would defect and blamed the defeat on the spread of anti-war propaganda and "anti-patriotic theories". Furthermore, in the following weeks General Cadorna partially changed his mind; he defined the first news on the defections as "exaggerated" and also poured his criticism on the commanders, guilty of serious errors and "infringements of good rules for the conduct of the troops"; However, General Cadorna, Colonel Roberto Bencivenga, his main collaborator, and the senior officers of the supreme command completely lacked an understanding of the novelty and effectiveness of the new tactical methods used by the Austro-Hungarian troops in the counterattack on the Carso.

At the end of the brief counteroffensive of Flondar, the Austro-Hungarian army had achieved its limited tactical objectives; at the cost of significant but much lower losses than the Italian ones, the imperial-royal troops had gained space between the Brestovizza valley and the sea, pushing back the Italian lines by a few kilometers and moving the enemy 3.5 kilometers away from the important massif of Monte Ermada. Furthermore, by using the new tactical methods of assault, they had routed some Italian units and demonstrated a clear superiority over the enemy's static systems. The Austro-Hungarians had successfully adopted the innovative tactics first studied by the German general staff to overcome the great difficulties that arose in the first years of the war due to the organization of enormous continuous lines of trenches. On 4 September 1917 the Austrians counterattacked again on the Carso using infiltration tactics and achieved a new tactical success by surprising the Italians. Starting from 24 October 1917, the use of selected Stosstruppen units and infiltration tactics would have allowed the Austro-Germans to inflict the disastrous Battle of Caporetto to the Italian Army, exhausted by the interminable trench warfare, shaken by bloody losses and material and moral suffering.

== Sources ==
- Mursia, ed. (1988). La Grande Guerra sul fronte italiano. Milano: Gianni Pieropan. ISBN 88-425-2830-7.
- Bur, ed. (2006). Caporetto, una battaglia e un enigma. Bergamo: Mario Silvestri. ISBN 88-17-10711-5.
- Bur, ed. (2001). Isonzo 1917. Milano: Mario Silvestri. ISBN 88-17-12719-1.
