= Aminto Caretto =

Italian officer

- Born: 7 October 1893; Crescentino, Kingdom of Italy
- Died: 5 August 1942 (aged 48); Serafimovich, Soviet Union
- Military career
- Allegiance: Kingdom of Italy
- Branch: Royal Italian Army
- Service years: 1912–1942
- Rank: Colonel
- Commands: XXVI Arditi unit 3rd Bersaglieri Regiment
- Conflicts: World War I; Battles of the Isonzo; Battle of Asiago; Second Battle of the Piave River; Battle of Vittorio Veneto; Second Italo-Senussi War; World War II; Axis invasion of Yugoslavia; Italian campaign on the Eastern Front; Capture of Stalino; First Battle of Don †
- Awards: Gold Medal of Military Valor (posthumous); Silver Medal of Military Valor (three times); Bronze Medal of Military Valor (three times); War Cross for Military Valor

Aminto Caretto (Crescentino, 7 October 1893 – Serafimovich, 5 August 1942) was an Italian Arditi and Bersaglieri officer, commander of the XXVI Arditi unit in World War I and of the 3rd Bersaglieri Regiment in World War II. He was mortally wounded on the Eastern Front during World War II and posthumously awarded the Gold Medal of Military Valor.

== Biography ==
He was born in Crescentino, province of Vercelli, on 7 October 1893, the third and last son of Giovanni Caretto and Emilia Fontana. After entering the Military Academy of Modena in 1912, in 1914 he became a lieutenant in the Bersaglieri Corps. After the Kingdom of Italy entered the First World War on 24 May 1915, he fought with the 4th Bersaglieri Regiment on the Karst Plateau (where he became commander of the 14th Company, XXXVII Bersaglieri Battalion) and later, after promotion to captain, in the 14th Bersaglieri Regiment, being wounded on Monte Zebio in June 1916, during the battle of Asiago. After recovering he returned to active service in 1917, and on the following year, after promotion to captain, he was given command of the XXVI Arditi unit, distinguishing himself during the Second Battle of the Piave River in June 1918, where he earned a Silver and a Bronze Medal of Military Valor, and during the battle of Vittorio Veneto, where he was awarded another bronze medal.

In 1922 he was transferred to the Royal Corps of Colonial Troops of Eritrea, assigned to the X Eritrean Battalion, participating between 1923 and 1926 in the war operations in Cyrenaica, aimed at the reconquest of Jebel, in which he received a solemn commendation and a third bronze medal. He then returned to service at the 4th Bersaglieri Regiment, being promoted to major in 1928. He was later transferred to the 11th and then to the 3rd Bersaglieri Regiment, and after promotion to lieutenant colonel he was assigned to the Inspectorate of Motorized Troops.

On 1 January 1940 he was promoted to colonel, and in October of the same year he assumed command of the 3rd Bersaglieri Regiment. In May 1941 he participated in the invasion of Yugoslavia; in July 1941 he returned to Italy with the regiment, but shortly thereafter he left for the Eastern Front with the Italian Expeditionary Corps in Russia. In the fall of 1941 he led his regiment in the capture of Horlivka (November 1941) and in repulsing a Soviet attack in Petropavlivka (the so-called "Battle of Christmas" of 25–31 December 1941), for which he was awarded his second a third Silver Medals of Military Valor. On 31 July 1942 he was wounded in the leg during a clash in Serafimovich, on the Don river; he refused to leave his regiment to be treated in hospital until his wound had become seriously gangrenous, which resulted in his death five days later, at field hospital n.46. He was posthumously awarded the Gold Medal of Military Valor.
