= 3rd Bersaglieri Regiment =

Active Italian Army infantry unit

- 3° Reggimento bersaglieri
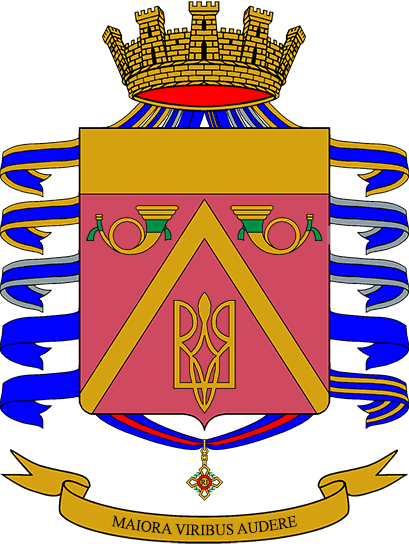
- Regimental coat of arms
- Active: 16 April 1861 — 12 Sept. 1943; 1 July 1946 — today
- Country: Italy
- Branch: Italian Army
- Part of: Mechanized Brigade "Sassari"
- Garrison/HQ: Teulada
- Motto: "Maiora viribus audere"
- Anniversaries: 18 June 1836
- Decorations: 2x Military Order of Italy; 3x Gold Medals of Military Valor; 3x Silver Medals of Military Valor; 3x Bronze Medals of Military Valor; 1x Silver Medal of Army Valor; 1x Bronze Medal of Civil Merit; 1x Silver Cross of Army Merit

Insignia
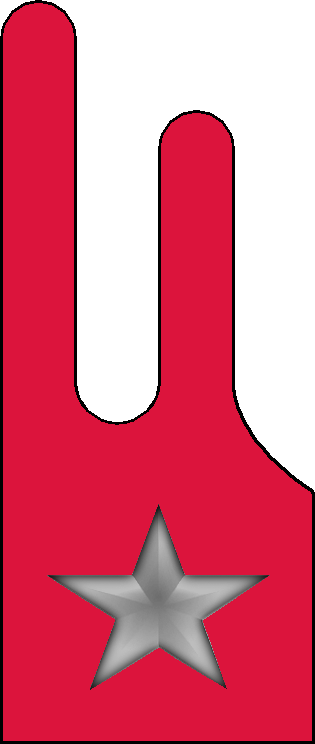
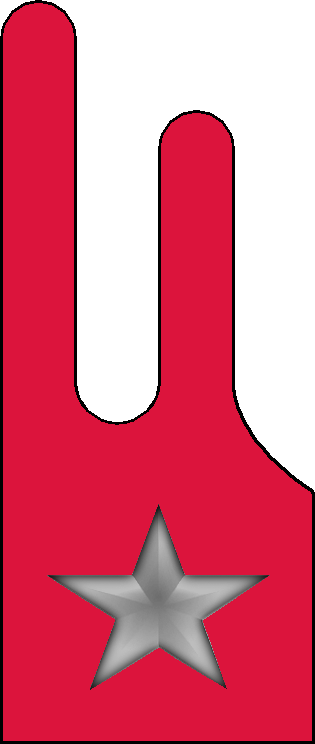
- Bersaglieri gorget patches

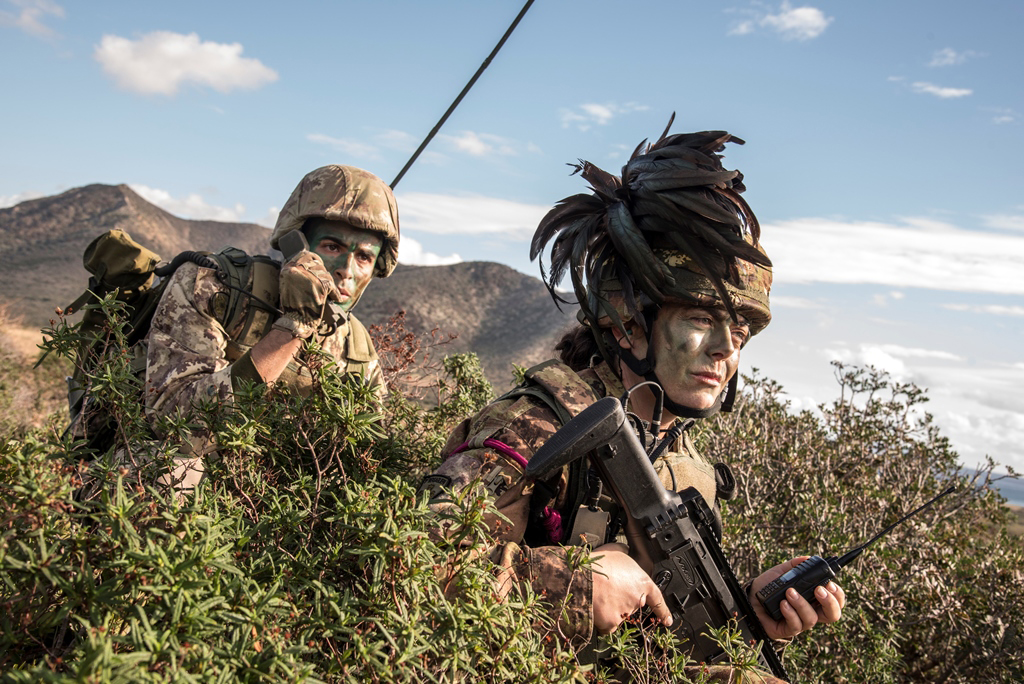
3rd Bersaglieri Regiment lieutenant with her radioman during an exercise in Sardinia

The 3rd Bersaglieri Regiment (Italian: 3° Reggimento Bersaglieri) is an active unit of the Italian Army based in Teulada in Sardinia. The regiment is part of the army's infantry corps' Bersaglieri speciality and operationally assigned to the Mechanized Brigade "Sassari". The regiment is the highest decorated unit of the Italian Army with three Gold Medals of Military Valor. The regiment was formed in 1861 by the Royal Italian Army with preexisting battalions. During World War I the regiment served on the Italian front.

During World War II the regiment was assigned to the 3rd Cavalry Division "Principe Amedeo Duca d'Aosta", with which it served in the Italian campaign in Ukraine and Russia. In winter 1942-43 the regiment suffered heavy casualties during the Soviet Little Saturn and Voronezh–Kharkov offensives. For its valor and sacrifice in the Soviet Union the regiment was awarded two Gold Medals of Military Valor. In 1946 the regiment was reformed and in 1951 it was assigned to the Armored Brigade "Centauro". In 1975 the regiment was disbanded and its flag and traditions assigned to the 18th Bersaglieri Battalion "Poggio Scanno". The regiment was reformed in 1992. In 2009 the regiment moved to Sardinia, where it was assigned to the Mechanized Brigade "Sassari". The regiment's anniversary falls, as for all Bersaglieri units, on 18 June 1836, the day the Bersaglieri speciality was founded.

== History ==
On 16 April 1861 the 3rd Army Corps Bersaglieri Command was formed in Modena and assigned to the III Army Corps. The command had purely administrative functions and consisted of the preexisting III, V, XVIII, XX, XXIII, and XXV battalions, and the III Bersaglieri Depot Battalion. On 31 December 1861 the command was renamed 3rd Bersaglieri Regiment, but continued to exert only administrative functions. On 18 December 1864 the Bersaglieri regiments were reduced from six to five and consequently the 4th Bersaglieri Regiment was disbanded and its XII Battalion transferred to the 3rd Bersaglieri Regiment. In 1865 the regiment formed the XXXVIII Battalion and now consisted of eight battalions. In 1866, in preparation for the Third Italian War of Independence, the regiment formed the XLVIII Battalion, which was disbanded in December 1870.

On 1 January 1871 the 3rd Bersaglieri Regiment was reorganized as an operational regiment with the XVIII Battalion, XX Battalion, XXV Battalion, and XXXVIII Battalion, while the III Battalion, V Battalion, XII Battalion, and XXIII Battalion were transferred to the newly formed 8th Bersaglieri Regiment. The four remaining battalions were renumbered as I, II, III, and IV battalion. On 16 September 1883 the IV Battalion was disbanded. On 18 June 1886, all Bersaglieri battalions resumed their original numbering and afterwards the 3rd Bersaglieri Regiment consisted of the XVIII Battalion, XX Battalion, and XXV Battalion.

On 15 April 1860 the Royal Sardinian Army formed the XVIII Battalion with volunteers drawn from militia units of the Grand Duchy of Tuscany, which had fought in the Second Italian War of Independence in 1859. In 1860 the XX and XXV battalions were formed. The three battalions participated in the Sardinian campaign in central and southern Italy, during which the XXV Battalion distinguished itself in the Siege of Ancona. For its conduct at Ancona the battalion was awarded a Bronze Medal of Military Valor, which was affixed to the flag of the 3rd Bersaglieri Regiment and added to the regiment's coat of arms, when the battalion joined the regiment. In 1862 the XXV Battalion participated in the Battle of Aspromonte against Giuseppe Garibaldi's Redshirts, which were marching to occupy Rome. For stopping Garibaldi's volunteers the XXV Battalion was awarded a Bronze Medal of Military Valor, which was affixed to the flag of the 3rd Bersaglieri Regiment and added to the regiment's coat of arms, when the battalion joined the regiment.

In 1866 the battalions participated in the Third Italian War of Independence, during which the XXV Battalion distinguished itself in the Battle of Borgo and the Battle of Levico. For its conduct at Borgo and Levico the battalion was awarded a Silver Medal of Military Valor, which was affixed to the flag of the 3rd Bersaglieri Regiment and added to the regiment's coat of arms. In September 1870 the XX Battalion participated in the capture of Rome. In 1895-96 the regiment provided 11 officers and 256 troops to help form the I, III, IV, and V provisional battalions, which were deployed to Eritrea for the First Italo-Ethiopian War. On 1 October 1910 the regiment's depot in Livorno formed the III Cyclists Battalion. In 1911, the regiment provided 26 officers and 1,279 troops to augment units fighting in the Italo-Turkish War.

=== World War I ===
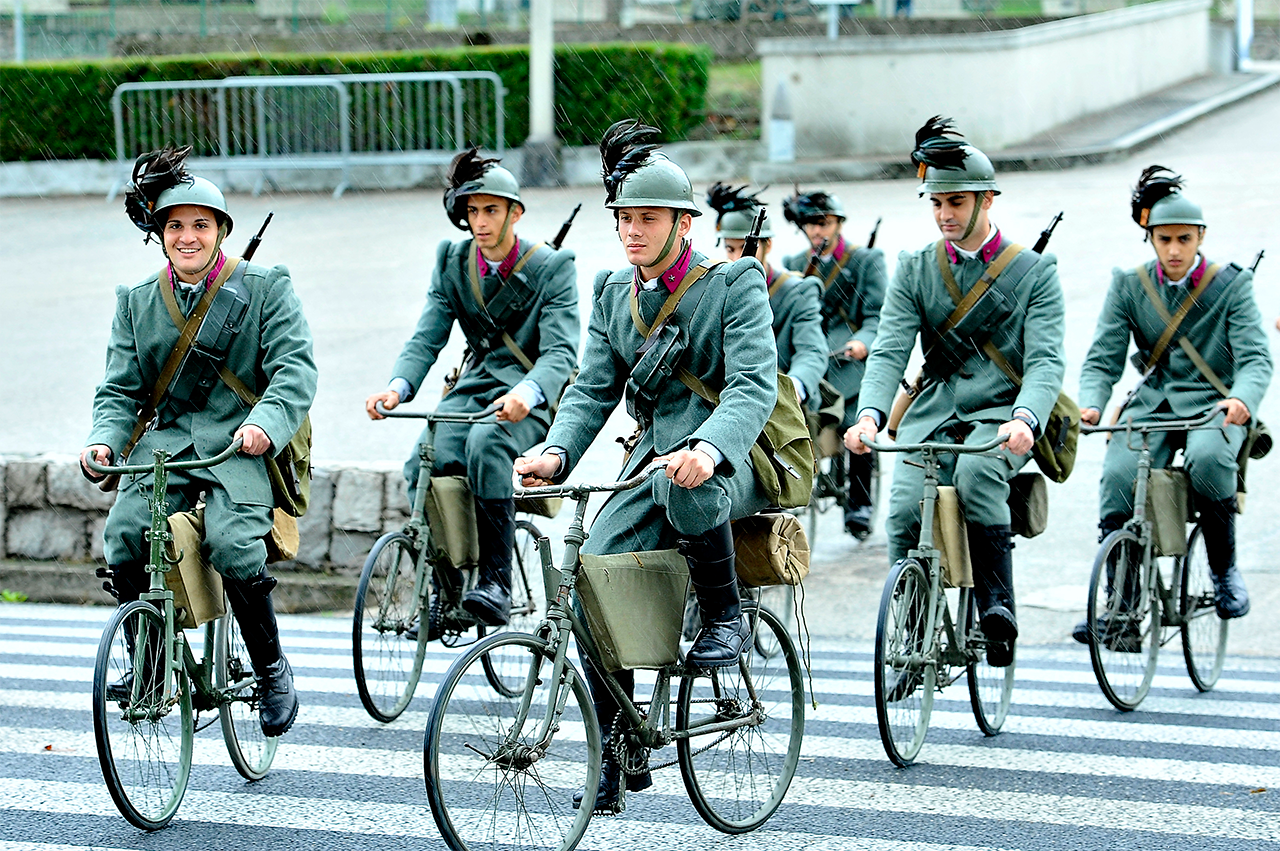
Bersaglieri troops in World War I Bersaglieri cyclists' uniform

In January 1915 the regimental depot in Livorno formed the LII Battalion, which sailed in May 1915 to Libya, where the battalion operated as an autonomous unit throughout World War 1. In May 1915, shortly before Italy's entry into the war, the 3rd Bersaglieri Regiment consisted of the XVIII, XX, and XXV battalions, and the III Cyclists Battalion, which operated as an autonomous unit throughout the war. On 24 May 1915, the day after Italy's entry into the war, the regiment operated in the Dolomites. On 1 June the Bersaglieri occupied the San Pellegrino Pass. Between 7 and 20 July 1915, the 3rd Bersaglieri Regiment, together with the 52nd Infantry Regiment and 59th Infantry Regiment, tried to storm the summit of the Col di Lana. Between 18 October and 12 November 1915, the regiment, together with Alpini units and the regiments of the Brigade "Torino" attempted to break the Austro-hungarian frontline between Col di Lana and Lagazuoi. This operation cost the 3rd Bersaglieri Regiment 29 officers 536 troops.

On 22 November 1915 the regiment's depot in Livorno formed the regimental command of the 13th Bersaglieri Regiment and the LX Battalion for the new regiment. The regimental depot also formed the XL Battalion, which left Livorno on 2 January 1916 and joined the 14th Bersaglieri Regiment on 11 March 1916. On 17 April 1916 troops of the Brigade "Calabria" occupied the Col di Lana summit and on 20 April the regiment's XX and XXV battalions, together with the 60th Infantry Regiment, tried, but ultimately failed to storm the nearby summit Monte Sief. On 15 May 1915, the 3rd Bersaglieri Regiment and 46th Infantry Regiment tried again to conquer Monte Sief. After two days of heavy combat on the slopes of the mountain the Italian troops had to retreat to their own lines and the 3rd Bersaglieri Regiment left ten officers and 280 soldiers on the field of battle.

The rest of the 1916 the regiment was in the area of Piccolo Colbricon and Val Cismon. On 6 February 1917 the 17th Bersaglieri Regiment was formed and the depot of the 3rd Bersaglieri Regiment formed the LXV Battalion for the new regiment. On 24 October 1917 the Austro-Hungarian Army and Imperial German Army commenced the Battle of Caporetto, which quickly forced the Italian armies to retreat from the front along the Isonzo river to a new front along the Piave river. The Italian retreat from the Isonzo front forced the Italian units deployed in the Dolomites into a fighting retreat towards the Venetian plain. On 4 November 1917, the 3rd Bersaglieri Regiment began its retreat through the Piave valley. On 13 November the regiment established a defensive line along the Piave river between Fener and Pederobba. The line ran along the railway dam located between the foot of the Monfenera ridge and the Piave river. Over the next weeks the First Battle of the Piave River raged and repeated Austro-Hungarian attacks forced the Italian defenders to fall back from Fener towards the Monte Tomba, but the line along the Piave river held. On 4 December the 3rd Bersaglieri Regiment was relieved by troops of the 65th French Division. In a month of fighting the regiment had lost 37 officers and 907 soldiers.

In June 1918 the regiment fought in the Second Battle of the Piave River in the area of Monte Valbella, where it lost 26 officers and 509 soldiers. On 29 August 1918 the regiment formed, together with the 2nd Bersaglieri Regiment, the VII Bersaglieri Brigade. On 24 October 1918 Italy commenced the Battle of Vittorio Veneto and in the afternoon of the 27 October the VI and VII Bersaglieri brigades crossed the Piave river South of the island of Grave di Papadopoli. On 30 October the VII brigade attacked towards Oderzo and from there rapidly advanced to San Vito al Tagliamento in pursuit of the fleeing Austro-Hungarian armies. On 4 November the 3rd Bersaglieri Regiment reached Castions di Strada, where the regiment was informed of the end of the war.

During the war the regiment's III Cyclists Battalion fought as an autonomous unit. In 1915 the battalion was deployed on the Karst plateau, where the battalion fought in the Second Battle of the Isonzo. During the battle the battalion conquered enemy positions at Vermegliano on 19-21 July and then on Monte Sei Busi on 28-29 July. On 6 August 1916, the first day of the Sixth Battle of the Isonzo, the battalion took Hill 85 to the East of Monfalcone. On 14-16 September 1916, during the Seventh Battle of the Isonzo, the battalion conquered and then held Hill 144 East of Monfalcone against repeated Austro-Hungarian counterattacks. For taking Hill 144 the battalion was awarded a Silver Medal of Military Valor, which was affixed to the flag of the 3rd Bersaglieri Regiment and added to the regiment's coat of arms. In 1917 the battalion fought again on the Karst plateau, first in the Battle of Flondar and then on Monte Ermada. After the Battle of Caporetto the battalion fought a delaying action at Ponte di Pinzano and then retreated to the Piave river, where it took up positions at Zenson di Piave during the First Battle of the Piave River. In 1918 the battalion fought in the Second Battle of the Piave River at Fossalta di Piave. During the Battle of Vittorio Veneto the battalion crossed the Piave at Grave di Papadopoli and then advanced to Conegliano. The battalion then crossed the Fadalto Pass and via Longarone reached Pieve di Cadore by 4 November. After the war the III Cyclists Battalion was disbanded in 1919, but in 1922 the battalion was awarded a Gold Medal of Military Valor, for having conquered enemy positions at Vermegliano, on Monte Sei Busi, and East of Monfalcone, and for its conduct during the Second Battle of the Piave River and the Battle of Vittorio Veneto. The only other Bersaglieri unit to be awarded a Gold Medal of Military Valor during the war was the 18th Bersaglieri Regiment. The Gold Medal of Military Valor awarded to the III Cyclists Battalion, was affixed to the flag of the 3rd Bersaglieri Regiment and added to the regiment's coat of arms.

=== Interwar years ===
In 1920 the regiment's XX and XXV battalions were reduced to reserve units. On 27 April 1923 the XXV Battalion was reformed and the XX Battalion disbanded. In July 1924 the regiment became a cyclists unit. The same year the XXV Battalion was renumbered as XX Battalion. By 1926 the regiment consisted of the XVIII and XX battalions, and a depot. On 23 March 1935 the regiment was mobilized in preparation for the Second Italo-Ethiopian War. As part of the preparation the regiment reformed the XXV Battalion as a machine gunners unit and formed the LXXXIII Reinforcements Battalion. On 1 April 1935 the regimental depot in Livorno reformed the 18th Bersaglieri Regiment, which consisted of the reformed LXVII and LXVIII battalions.

=== Second Italo-Ethiopian War ===
In May 1935 the regiment arrived in Eritrea, where it was attached to the 30th Infantry Division "Sabauda". At the outbreak of the war on 3 October 1935 the division held a defensive line near Barachit. After overcoming Ethiopian resistance at Fik’ada the division advanced rapidly into Ethiopian territory. In November 1935 the division took Negash, Agula and Bolbala and then moved to positions on the heights overlooking the Tekezé river. From 10–19 February 1936 the 3rd Bersaglieri Regiment fought in the Battle of Amba Aradam. For its role in the battle the regiment was awarded a Bronze Medal of Military Valor, which was affixed to the regiment's flag and added to the regiment's coat of arms.

On 15 March 1936, the 3rd Bersaglieri Regiment was assigned to Achille Starace's march on Gondar, which the Bersaglieri and the Blackshirts of the 82nd CC.NN. Battalion "Benito Mussolini" reached and occupied on 1 April. Meanwhile on 3 April 1936 the Sabauda moved to Amba Alagi, where it won a decisive encounter, and then pursued the retreating Ethiopians to Agumserta and finally to Lake Ashenge. With the way to Addis Ababa open, the division surged forward, reaching Shewa Kifle Hāger village on the capital's outskirts on 26 April 1936, and captured Addis Ababa itself on 5 May 1936. For its service in Ethiopia between 3 October 1935 and 5 May 1936 the 3rd Bersaglieri Regiment was awarded a Military Order of Italy, which was affixed to the regiment's flag.

On 16 December 1936 the 3rd Bersaglieri Regiment returned to Livorno, where on the same day the XXV Battalion and LXXXIII Reinforcements Battalion were disbanded. On 31 December 1936, the 18th Bersaglieri Regiment, which had been based in Livorno for the duration of the absence of the 3rd Bersaglieri Regiment, was disbanded. In 1937 the 3rd Bersaglieri Regiment moved from Livorno to Milan. On 7 April 1939 the XX Battalion participated in the Invasion of Albania. The same year the XXV Battalion was reformed.

=== World War II ===
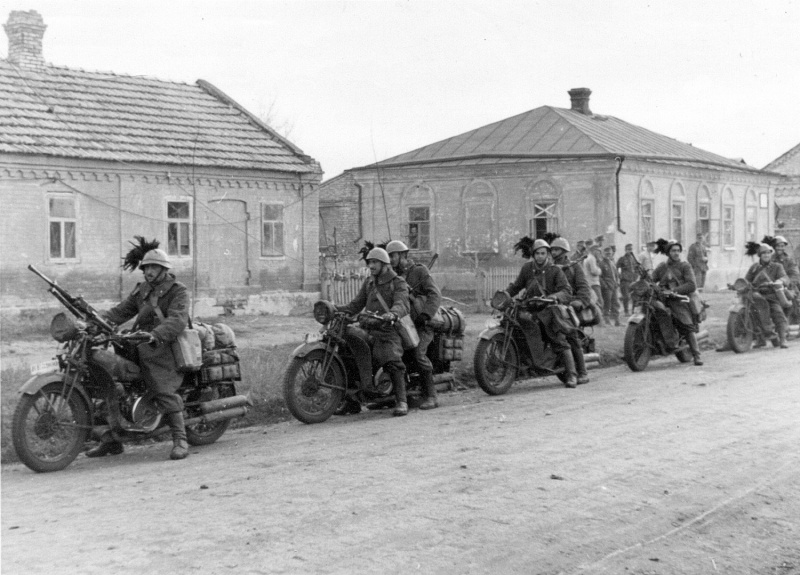
3rd Bersaglieri Regiment Motorcyclists in Donetsk in October 1941

In October 1939, the 3rd Bersaglieri Regiment was assigned to the 3rd Cavalry Division "Principe Amedeo Duca d'Aosta", which also included the cavalry regiments Regiment "Savoia Cavalleria" and Regiment "Lancieri di Novara", the 3rd Fast Artillery Regiment, and the III Fast Tank Group "San Giorgio". In June 1940 the division participated in the Invasion of France. In April 1941 the regiment participated in the Invasion of Yugoslavia and occupied Split. At the time the regiment consisted of the following units:

- 3rd Bersaglieri Regiment
  - Command Company
  - XVIII Battalion
  - XX Battalion
  - XXV Battalion
  - 3rd Motorcyclists Company
  - 3rd Cannons Company, with 47/32 mod. 35 anti-tank guns

==== Ukraine ====
In summer 1941 the 3rd Cavalry Division "Principe Amedeo Duca d'Aosta" was assigned to the Italian Expeditionary Corps in Russia and sent to the Eastern front. On 20 July 1941 the division left Italy and on 13 August 1941 it reached Dniprodzerzhynsk (today Kamianske) on the Dnipro river in central Ukraine. From 27 to 30 September 1941 the division fought in the Battle of Petrykivka. From 20 October 1941, the division fought in the battle to take control of Donetsk and Horlivka. Between 11 and 12 November, the XVIII and XX battalions prevented the encirclement of the 80th Infantry Regiment "Pasubio". In late November, the regiment occupied a defensive lines centred on the village of Petropavlivka.

On 15 March 1942, the two cavalry regiments, the 3rd Horse Artillery Regiment, as well as the III Fast Tanks Group "San Giorgio" left the division and were replaced by the 6th Bersaglieri Regiment and the 120th Motorized Artillery Regiment. In June 1942, Axis forces commenced their summer offensive and on 19 July 1942, the 3rd Bersaglieri Regiment occupied Millerovo in Russia. On 29 July 1942, the two Bersaglieri regiments reached the Don river near Serafimovich and between 30 July and 9 August the two regiments eliminated a Soviet bridgehead at Serafimovich. Later in the same month, and with the support of German tanks, the Bersaglieri repelled a Soviet attack during the first defensive battle of the Don.

By late autumn 1942, the Italian 8th Army was covering, together Hungarian and Romanian forces, the left flank of the German 6th Army, which was attacking Stalingrad. The Italian held front line stretched along the Don river for more than 250 kilometres (160 mi) between the positions of the Hungarian 2nd Army in Kalmiskowa and the positions of the Romanian 3rd Army in Veshenskaya. On 17 December Soviets forces commenced Operation Little Saturn and under immense pressure of superior Soviet armored forces the Italian divisions had to retreat from the Don the next day. After a short respite the Soviets commenced the Voronezh–Kharkov offensive on 13 January 1943 and the Axis forces had to fall back further, with the 3rd Cavalry Division "Principe Amedeo Duca d'Aosta" falling back towards Pavlohrad in Ukraine, where between 4 and 19 February 1943 the 3rd Bersaglieri Regiment held its positions against repeated Soviet attacks. On 19 February the remnants of the regiment retreated towards Dnipro, where the survivors arrived two days later.

For the valor shown in the operations between August 1941 and May 1942 and for the valor shown during the offensive to the Don the 3rd Bersaglieri Regiment was awarded two Gold Medals of Military Valor, which were affixed to the regiment's flag and added to the regiment's coat of arms.

In April 1943 the survivors of the regiment returned to Milan. On 8 September 1943, when the Armistice of Cassibile was announced, the regiment was located in the Emilia region and still in the process of being rebuilt. On 12 September 1943 invading German forces overcame and disbanded the 3rd Bersaglieri Regiment.

==== Italy ====
On 1 February 1944, the Italian Co-belligerent Army reformed the 4th Bersaglieri Regiment with the XXIX Battalion and the XXXIII Battalion of the 11th Bersaglieri Regiment. The reformed regiment was assigned to the I Motorized Grouping, which fought on the allied side in the Italian Campaign. On 18 April 1944 the I Motorized Grouping was expanded and renamed Italian Liberation Corps.

On 24 September 1944 the Italian Liberation Corps was disbanded its units and personnel used to form the combat groups "Folgore" and "Legnano". On the same date the remaining troops of the 4th Bersaglieri Regiment, which had suffered heavy losses fighting on the Winter Line and in the Battle of Ancona, were grouped, together with the survivors of the LI Bersaglieri Officer Cadets Training Battalion, into the Bersaglieri Battalion "Goito", which was assigned to the Special Infantry Regiment. The name "Goito" was chosen to commemorate the Battle of Goito Bridge, which was the baptism of fire for the Bersaglieri. The Special Infantry Regiment then joined the Combat Group "Legnano", which was equipped with British materiel and assigned to the Polish II Corps.

In winter 1944-45 the Combat Group "Legnano" fought on the Gothic Line and then in April 1945 in the Battle of Bologna. During the latter battle the Bersaglieri Battalion "Goito" broke through the German lines at Poggio Scanno, which opened the way for the Combat Group "Legnano" to Ozzano dell'Emilia and Bologna, which was liberated on 21 April. For its conduct and valor in the campaign to liberate Italy the Bersaglieri Battalion "Goito" was awarded a Silver Medal of Military Valor.

=== Cold War ===
After the war the Special Infantry Regiment of the Combat Group "Legnano" was disbanded on 30 June 1946 and the next day, on 1 July 1946, its battalions were used to reform the 67th Infantry Regiment "Legnano". However on the same date the Bersaglieri Battalion "Goito" was transferred from the 67th Infantry Regiment "Legnano" to the 3rd Bersaglieri Regiment, which was reformed on the same date in Brescia by reorganizing the 3rd Infantry Regiment. Upon entering the 3rd Bersaglieri Regiment as the regiment's I Battalion, the Silver Medal of Military Valor awarded to the Bersaglieri Battalion "Goito" was affixed to the flag of the 3rd Bersaglieri Regiment and added to the regiment's coat of arms.

The regiment, which consisted of three battalions, then moved from Brescia to Milan. In August 1948 the regiment reorganized its III Battalion as an armored unit and on 2 September the regiment became a motorized unit, which consisted of the I and II battalions, while the III Battalion prepared for its move to Pordenone. On 15 September 1949, the 8th Bersaglieri Regiment was reformed in Pordenone and the III Battalion was officially transferred to the reformed regiment. On 1 October of the same year, the 3rd Bersaglieri Regiment renumbered its two remaining battalions as XVIII Battalion and XX Battalion. On 10 May 1951 the regiment joined the Armored Brigade "Centauro", which was expanded on 1 November 1951 to Armored Division "Centauro". In September 1953 the regiment formed a recruits battalion, which on 1 November of the same year was designated XXV Battalion. In 1955 the regiment moved from Milan to Novara.

In 1963, the Armored Division "Centauro" adapted its organization to NATO standards and added a brigade level to the division's structure. On 1 November 1963, the I Mechanized Brigade "Centauro" was formed in Milan and the 3rd Bersaglieri Regiment, as well as support forces, entered the new brigade. On the same date the XX Battalion was transferred from the 3rd Bersaglieri Regiment to the 31st Tank Regiment, which in turn transferred its IV Tank Battalion to the 3rd Bersaglieri Regiment. Upon entering the 31st Tank Regiment the XX Battalion was redesignated as XXVIII Bersaglieri Battalion. Afterwards the brigade consisted of the following units:

- I Mechanized Brigade "Centauro", in Milan
  - 3rd Bersaglieri Regiment, in Milan
    - IV Tank Battalion, with M47 Patton main battle tanks
    - XVIII Bersaglieri Battalion, with M113 armored personnel carriers
    - XXV Bersaglieri Battalion, with M113 armored personnel carriers
    - Anti-tank Company, with M40 recoilless rifles
  - I Group/ 131st Armored Artillery Regiment, with M7 Priest self-propelled howitzers
  - I Service Battalion
  - 1st Engineer Company
  - 1st Signal Company

On 1 October 1968, the brigade headquarters were disbanded, however the IV Tank Battalion and XXVIII Bersaglieri Battalion did not return to their original regiments. In November 1968 the regiment was deployed in the Province of Vercelli to help rescue efforts after heavy floods had devastated the area. For its work in Vercelli the regiment was awarded a Bronze Medal of Civil Merit, which was affixed to the regiment's flag.

During the 1975 army reform the army disbanded the regimental level and newly independent battalions were granted for the first time their own flags. On 20 October 1975, the 3rd Bersaglieri Regiment was disbanded and the next day the regiment's XVIII Bersaglieri Battalion in Milan became an autonomous unit and was renamed 18th Bersaglieri Battalion "Poggio Scanno". The battalion was named for the Battle of the Poggio Scanno, where the Bersaglieri Battalion "Goito" had distinguished itself on 19 April 1945. On the same day the regiment's XXV Bersaglieri Battalion was renamed 10th Bersaglieri Battalion "Bezzecca", while the IV Tank Battalion in Solbiate Olona was renamed 4th Tank Battalion "M.O. Passalacqua". The three battalions were assigned to the 3rd Mechanized Brigade "Goito", which was formed on the same day by reorganizing the command of the 3rd Bersaglieri Regiment. Each of the two Bersaglieri battalions consisted now of a command, a command and services company, three mechanized companies with M113 armored personnel carriers, and a heavy mortar company with M106 mortar carriers with 120mm Mod. 63 mortars. Each of the two Bersaglieri battalions fielded now 896 men (45 officers, 100 non-commissioned officers, and 751 soldiers).

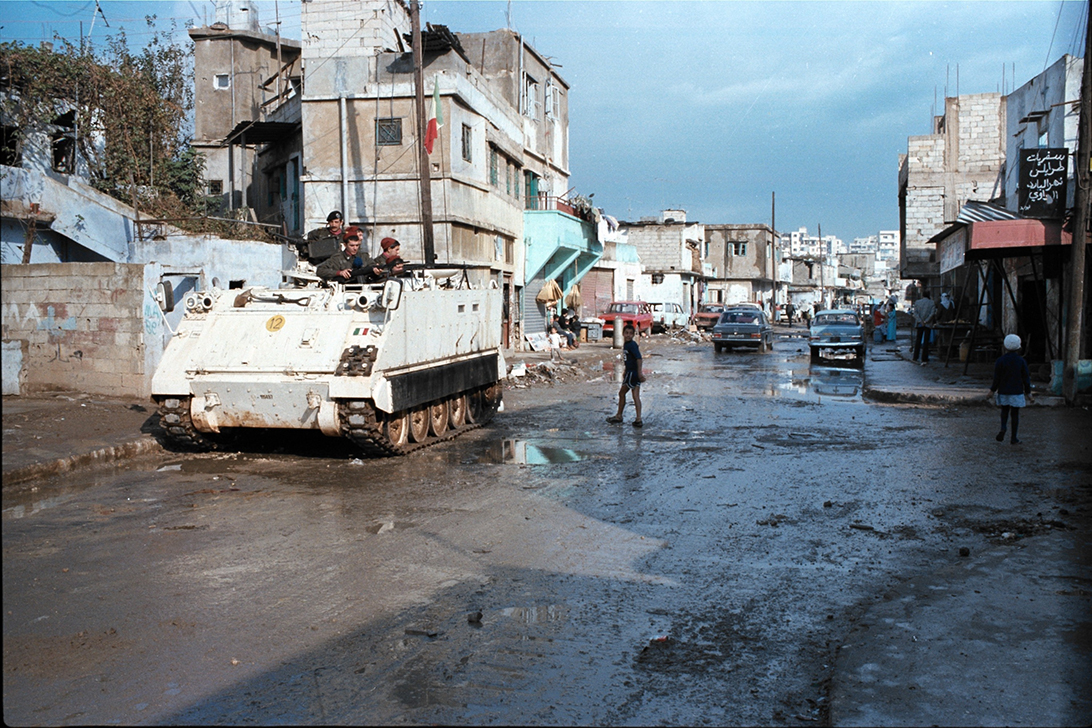
Soldiers of the 2nd Bersaglieri Battalion "Governolo" on patrol with the Multinational Force in Lebanon in 1982

On 12 November 1976 the President of the Italian Republic Giovanni Leone assigned with decree 846 the flag and traditions of the 3rd Bersaglieri Regiment to the 18th Bersaglieri Battalion "Poggio Scanno", and the flag and traditions of the 7th Bersaglieri Regiment to the 10th Bersaglieri Battalion "Bezzecca". In August 1982 the battalion formed a provisional company, which was attached to and deployed with the 2nd Bersaglieri Battalion "Governolo" to Lebanon as part of the Multinational Force in Lebanon from 26 September 1982 to 24 March 1983. A second provisional company formed by the 3rd Bersaglieri Regiment was attached to the 10th Bersaglieri Battalion "Bezzecca", when that battalion deployed to Lebanon on from 15 February to 13 July 1983.

=== Recent times ===
After the end of the Cold War Italian Army began to draw down its forces and on 1 June 1991 the 3rd Mechanized Brigade "Goito" was disbanded and the 18th Bersaglieri Battalion "Poggio Scanno" was transferred to the Mechanized Brigade "Legnano". On 28 August 1991, the 18th Bersaglieri Battalion "Poggio Scanno" lost its autonomy and the next day the battalion entered the reformed 3rd Bersaglieri Regiment "Goito". On 1 August 1992, the regiment was renamed 3rd Bersaglieri Regiment.

Between 30 September 1993 and 30 January 1994 the 3rd Bersaglieri Regiment served with the United Nations Operation in Somalia II, for which it was awarded a Silver Medal of Army Valor, which was affixed to the regiment's flag and added to the regiment's coat of arms. On 14 September 1996 the regiment was transferred from the Mechanized Brigade "Legnano" to the Armored Brigade "Centauro". On 5 October 2002, the Armored Brigade "Centauro" was disbanded and the 3rd Bersaglieri Regiment was transferred to the 132nd Armored Brigade "Ariete". On 30 November 2009, the 3rd Bersaglieri Regiment moved from Milan to Teluada in Sardinia, where it joined the Mechanized Brigade "Sassari".

From August 2020 to January 2021 the regiment deployed to Lebanon as part of the UN's United Nations Interim Force in Lebanon. For its service in Lebanon the regiment was awarded a Silver Cross of Army Merit, which was affixed to the regiment's flag.

== Organization ==
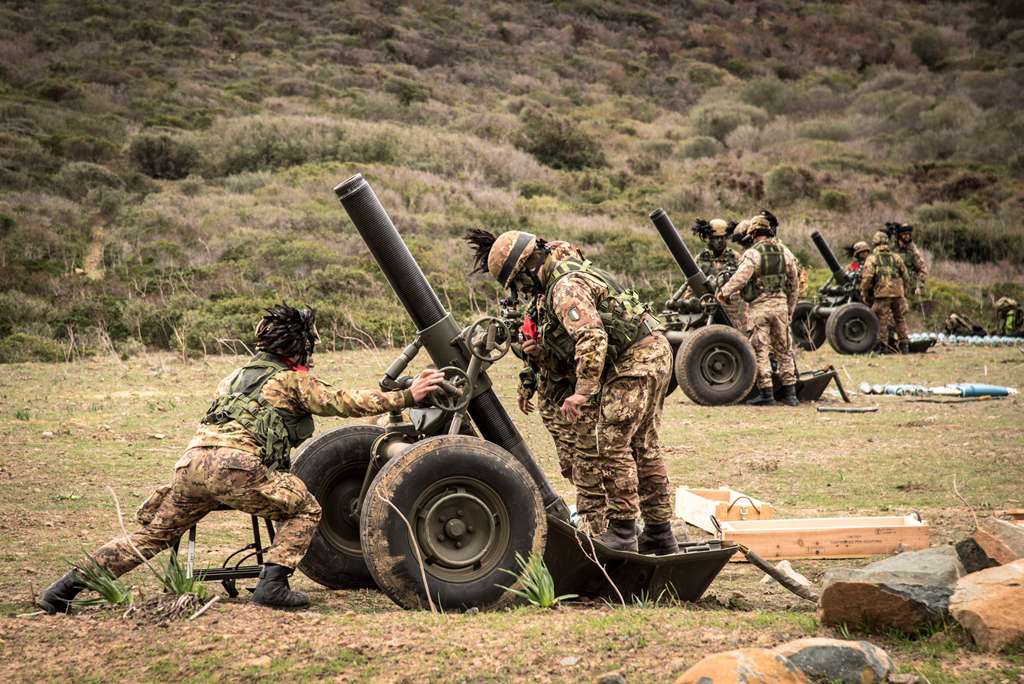
3rd Bersaglieri Regiment mortar team during an exercise in Sardinia

As of 2024 the 3rd Bersaglieri Regiment is organized as follows:

- 3rd Bersaglieri Regiment, in Teulada
  - Command and Logistic Support Company
  - 18th Bersaglieri Battalion "Poggio Scanno"
    - 1st Bersaglieri Company
    - 2nd Bersaglieri Company
    - 3rd Bersaglieri Company
    - Maneuver Support Company

The regiment is equipped with Freccia wheeled infantry fighting vehicles and VTLM Lince multi-role vehicles. The Maneuver Support Company is equipped with 120mm mortars and Spike MR anti-tank guided missiles.

== See also ==
- Bersaglieri
