= Stazione Bacologica Sperimentale =

Italian silk farming institution

The Stazione Bacologica Sperimentale is an institution specialising in sericulture (silk-farming) in Padua, Italy. It was founded in 1871 by a decree of the King, Vittorio Emanuele II.

The actual founder was Enrico Verson. It is a section of the Institute for Experimental Agrarian Zoology of Florence. The current director is Dr. Luciano Cappellozza and the Institute building is owned by the Provincial Administration of Padua, which is planning a museum with live collections of insects. This will include exhibitions on sericulture, apiculture and a general display of Lepidoptera. The sericultural part will show the silk collections of the Section as well as old tools and machines used for the rearing of the silkworm and the reeling of the cocoon.

The institute is involved in scientific projects on sericulture and moriculture, and contributes to the conservation of two germplasm banks of ca. 50 varieties of Morus spp. and ca. 120 strains of Bombyx mori. The institution owns a mulberry field, also used for experiments, that provides the leaves necessary for the rearing and breeding of the various Bombyx strains.

== Notable workers ==
- Mario Tirelli
