= Enrico Verson =

Italian entomologist

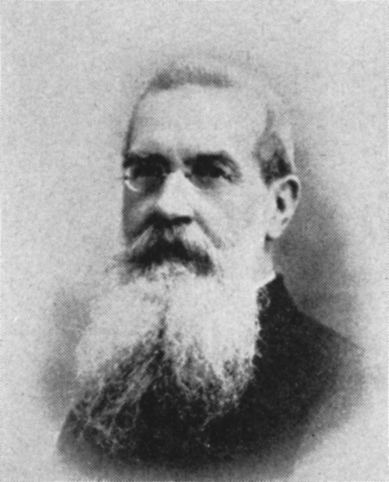

Enrico Verson (25 April 1845 in Padua – 15 February 1927 in Padua) was an Italian entomologist.

A physician, Verson worked initially at the experimental station of Gorizia before founding the second research station on the silkworm in the world, the Stazione Bacologica Sperimentale in 1871. Verson made many observations on the biology of the silkworm and made anatomical discoveries such as the cells of Verson (apical cells of the genital apparatus of certain insects) and glands of Verson (glands of the exoskeleton (skin) of the caterpillars playing an important part in the moult).

He had a considerable influence on the Italian entomologists of his and the following generation like Antonio Berlese (1863–1927), Adolfo Targioni Tozzetti (1823–1902) and Filippo Silvestri (1873–1949).
