= Alfred von Schenk =

Alfred Edler von Schenk
- Born: 5 July 1863; Laibach, Austrian Empire
- Died: 12 October 1952 (aged 89); Vienna, Austria

Alfred Edler von Schenk (born Alfred Schenk; 5 July 1863 – 12 October 1952) was an Austrian general and later Czechoslovak government advisor.

== Early years and military career ==
Von Schenk was born in Laibach now Ljubljana in Slovenia, into a Roman Catholic middle-class family, to Moriz, a retired senior civil servant, and Eulalia Zwierzina. His mother descended from a long line of military officers. The young Alfred received his fundamentals in Ljubljana, and moved to Praha in Bohemia to complete his education, where thanks to his German-Austrian sounding last name, was able to join the local and prestigious Gymnasium. Life in Prague was very good at the time and being a German Austrian he could have lived well enough, even without speaking the local Czech language, but notwithstanding, he became very fluent in Czech, a fluency described next to be a bilingual, showing a great attitude, in learning languages, an ability he was to exploit with success, during the assignment, in the Balkans and in Russia, to the intelligence and counterintelligence unit.

After having successfully completed three of the eight classes, on 11 July 1880, he volunteered into the Common Army and was assigned to the 21st Infantry Regiment “Freiherr von Mondel” then based in Prague. On 18 September 1880 he was promoted Sergeant, and on 18 August 1881 he entered into the Cadet Company of the 24th Feldjager (Rifles) Battalion. His personal files described him as an excellent marksman, with a calm and relaxed personality, with a high sense of duty and a strong morality. A disciplinarian with his juniors, he was, however, very attentive to their problems.

The early months of 1882 Alfred von Schenk saw action during the suppression of the second Krivošije uprising in southern Dalmatia. His commission was highly recommended by Colonel Paul Hostinek. He was commissioned 2nd Lieutenant in the 91st Infantry Regiment “Ritter von Fröhlich” on 1 May 1884, then promoted to 1st Lieutenant on 1 November 1888. A year later he was assigned to the 9th Infantry Brigade staff in Olomutz, and on 24 November 1891 he was a staff Officer of the 2nd Mountain Brigade in Trebinjie (now Bosnia and Herzegovina). During this assignment he was to become familiar with the Istria, Kraina, Carinthia and Styria regions, and also improved his knowledge on south-west Hungary and Turkey, while attached to military missions. In the meantime, he also learned French. On 5 May 1892 he was promoted Captain and assigned to staff of the 12th Army Corps in Hermannstadt, today Sibiu in Rumania. He started the study of Russian language, and from 1 May 1895 until 14 May 1896 he was in Kazan, presently the capital of the Republic of Tatarstan, officially to study the language, but in reality serving as an undercover Agent.

Promoted to the rank of Major on 1 November 1898, he was assigned as Chief of Staff of the 16th Infantry Division. On 1 May 1902 he was made Lieutenant Colonel and assigned to the 1st Bosnian Herzegovinian Infantry Regiment, becoming its commander on 13 April 1907. On 27 November 1905 he was promoted to Colonel.

== Ennoblement and World War I ==
In February 1911, Schenk was ennobled and thus he added the predicate “von” to his last name; the following 11 May he was promoted to Generalmajor. In February 1914 at the approach of World War I, he was commanding the 97th Infantry Brigade in Vienna and with the coming of war against Russia he was an army rear area commander. In late August 1914 he was appointed commander of the 15th Infantry Division. And the promotion to Feldmarschall-leutnant or Field Marshal Lieutenant arrived on 1 November 1914.

=== The Isonzo Front ===
Appointed commanding officer of the 9th Infantry Division he saw further service in Italy on the Isonzo Front as Sector Commander of "Abschnitt" or Sector III B. The units deployed on Sector III B were; the 9th Infantry Division, the 24th Landsturm Mountain Brigade, the 59th Infantry Brigade and the 43rd Artillery Brigade. The area of responsibility stretched from the southern end of the Carso Mountains, to the east of the port city of Monfalcone and was subsequently renamed as “Group Schenk”. The strength of the group grew up when the 10th Infantry Division, stationed in Josefstadt or Josefov in Bohemia, in peacetime, was added to the group which become the XXIII Army Corps, on 10 November 1916. With the creation of the XXIII Army Corps, General Shenck was no longer depending from the army corps commanded by Archduke Joseph August of Austria, but was directly at the orders of the Isonzo Army commander, Field Marshal Svetozar Boroević. At the beginning of the 7th Isonzo Battle Sector III B had a strength of 18 infantry battalions, 13,650 rifles, 77 piece of field artillery and 45 pieces of heavy siege artillery. The 24th Mountain Brigade, assigned to the sector between Nova Vas, and Hill 208, was composed by three territorial battalions, the 2nd, 3rd and the 4th part of the 11th Regiment of Infantry. Most of its personnel was recruited in the Jičín District of Bohemia, and were of Czech and Sudeten German descent, meanwhile, the 27th Territorial Infantry Regiment of Ljubljana, was composed mainly by Slovenians from the Carniola and Gorizia Counties. The entire 9th Infantry Division was deployed to cover the left part of the sector, from Hill 208 to Lisert, east of the seaport city of Monfalcone. It was composed by two infantry brigades: The 60th Lvov Brigade with the 1st, 2nd, and 3rd battalions of the 30th Lvov Infantry Regiment, and the 1st, 2nd, and 3rd Battalions of the 80th Zloczow Infantry Regiment, the ethnic make up of those units was mainly of Ruthenians and Polish; the other Infantry Brigade of the 9th Division, was the 17th Infantry Brigade of Praha, which included the 2nd, 3rd and 4th Battalions of the 91st Budweis Infantry Regiment of Ceske Budejovice, and the 2nd, 3rd and 4th Battalion of the 102nd Infantry Regiment of Beneschau, now Benešov, in Czech republic. The ethnic composition of the 91st Regiment was a mixture of the Czech and Sudeten German, while the 102nd Regiment was entirely made by Czechs. The 9th Division Infantry headquarters and the divisional hospital were located in the village of Gorjansko a village now in the southwestern part of the Municipality of Komen in the Littoral region of Slovenia on the border with Italy. During the eight and inconclusive, battle of the Isonzo, the “Gruppe Schenk now XXIII Army Corps” had a strength of 30 infantry battalions, with 20.180 rifles, 118 pieces of field artillery, and 37 pieces of heavy siege artillery. The corps was reinforced with another division, the 16th Infantry Division Nazysbzen (Sibiu) from Siebenbürgen (now Transylvania in Rumania), which was composed of the 31st and 32nd brigades. The 31st Brigade was formed by four battalions of the 2nd Infantry Regiment of Brasov, composed by Hungarians in majority with some Rumanians and Germans, and by the 1st Battalion of 62nd Infantry regiment from Mars-Vasarhely, now Târgu Mureș in Rumania, formed by Hungarians and Rumanians.

=== Kerensky Offensive, retirement and death ===
On 23 June 1917 he was given the command of the XIII Army Corps part of the Colonel General Karl Tersztyánszky von Nádas (28 October 1854 – 7 March 1921) 3rd Army, deployed in Stanislau, modern day Ivano-Frankivsk, in western Ukraine, a sector of the Russian theater. It was there that his career had a major setback. During the June offensive or Kerensky Offensive, first led by General Aleksei Brusilov soon replaced by General Lavr Kornilov, the Russian Army attacked the Austrian positions. The Austrian forces first suffered a heavy bombardment, and then were unable to contain the shock Russian battalions, that had penetrated the broad gap created. The 3rd Army broke out, leaving behind almost all the artillery and suffering heavy casualties. The offensive was later contained, thanks to the stubborn resistance of the German troops assigned to the German South Army. Following the defeat, Alfred Edler von Schenk was removed from command and replaced by General Citek. On 1 February 1918 he was promoted General der Infanterie (General of the Infantry) and assumed command of the IX Army Corps on 21 February 1918. The speedy and dramatic collapse of Austro-Hungarian Monarchy found General von Schenk as the Military Governor of Zagreb. He officially retired on 1 January 1919 after 44 years of active duty. His annual pension was 16.800 Krones with a house rent compensation of 1.152 Krones. On 23 December 1923 he was appointed by the new Czechoslovak government and moved into the new state, where he remained until the end of 1930. When the country was partitioned, he returned to Austria. He died in Vienna on 12 October 1952.

== Personal life ==
While studying in Russia, he met Viktoria von Grahe, the daughter of the Imperial Russian State advisor, Gustav Ferdinand Ritter von Grahe, and Viktoria Blonfeld from Kazan. She had a deposit of 1.200,00 Florins, a high sum for those years, and therefore the marriage was authorized, according with the marriage officer laws in the Austro-Hungarian Army. The couple married on 14 December 1896.

== Decorations and awards ==
Among his many decorations the general, was a Knight First Class of the Order of the Iron Crown (with war decoration and swords), holder of the Military Merit Cross Second Class (with war decoration and swords) and a Knight of the Order of Leopold (with war decoration and swords).

== Assessment ==
Von Schenk was considered to be a high level professional soldier, with a deep knowledge in conventional war, intelligence and counterintelligence. He had the qualities that a good commanding officer should have. A focused and dedicated inferior, and a disciplinarian but compassionate, senior. His great capability to learn languages made him a valuable element in the Multiethnic and Multilanguage Austrian-Hungarian Army. This attitude might have been helped by having been born in Ljubljana, where German was widely spoken, but the main language was Slovenian, a language whose knowledge may be useful in learning other Slavic languages. His language ability, added to a keen mind made him eligible to be selected for the k.u.k. Evidenzbureau, the Austrian-Hungarian directorate of intelligence and counterintelligence. While assigned to the directorate, to the Russian section, he had a role in the exposure and arrest of Colonel Alfred Redl – Russia's leading spy.
