= Mario Tirelli =

Italian entomologist

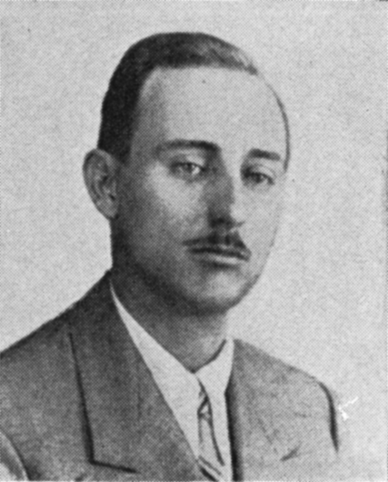
Mario Tirelli.

Mario Tirelli (born 1906, date of death unknown) was an Italian entomologist.

Tirelli was a specialist in the anatomy and biology of Bombyx mori the Mulberry silkmoth. He was under director of the Stazione Bacologica Sperimentale in Padua. He wrote Fisiologia degli Insetti (1929) and Atlante microfotografico della embriologia degli insetti (Bombyx mori). Col concorso della ditta G. Pasqualis di Vittorio Veneto, Padova, Regia Stazione Bacologica Sperimentale. (1930).
