= Monte Ermada =

Hill in Italy

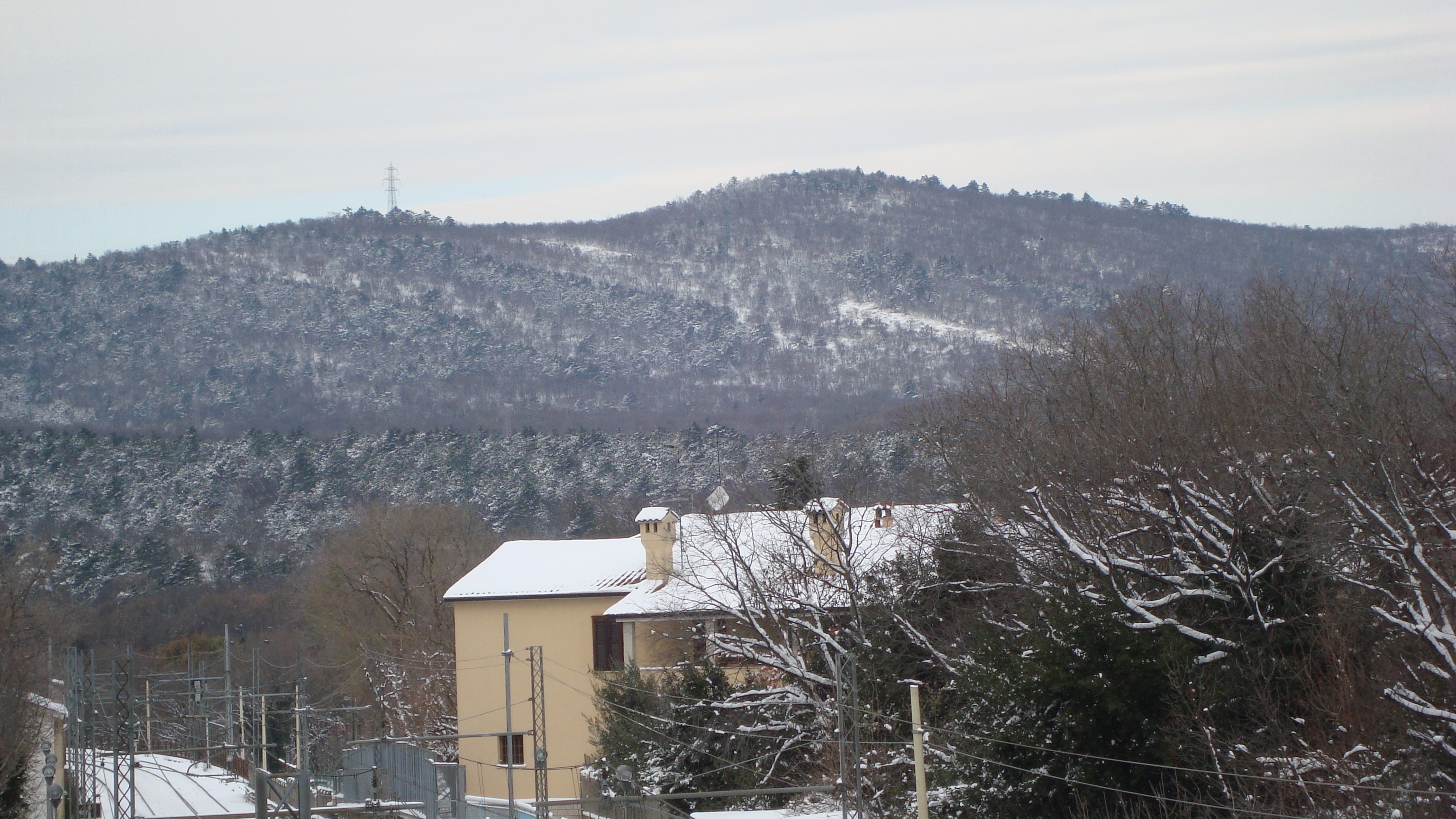
- The Ermada in winter

Highest point
- Elevation: 323 m (1,060 ft)
- Coordinates: 45°47′41″N 13°37′35″E

Geography
- Location: Friuli-Venezia Giulia, Italy
- Parent range: Karst Plateau

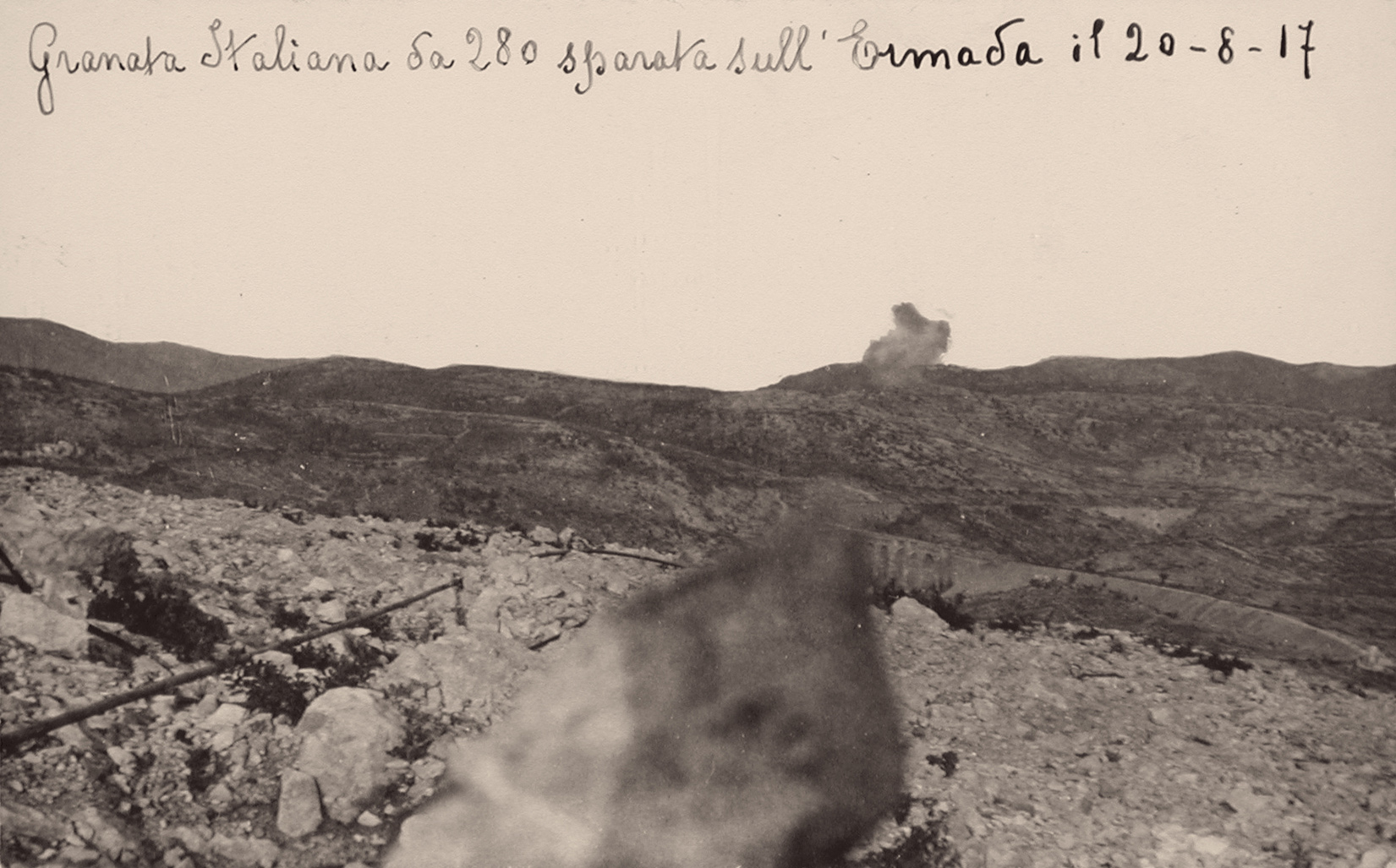
Italian 280mm shell detonates on Monte Ermada on 20 August 1917 during the Eleventh Battle of the Isonzo

Monte Ermada, also known as Hermada (Slovene: Grmada) is a hill on the Karst Plateau, near the border between the Italian provinces of Trieste and Gorizia. Most of it is located in the municipality of Duino-Aurisina, with its eastern appendages in Slovenian territory. It consists of a massif with several peaks: besides the main peak, which stands 323 meters above sea level, there are Jastreb (289 m), Goljak (278 m), Grižnik (225 m), Vrh Griže (280 m), Cocco/Na Kokem (280 m), Frščak (235 m), Ter (281 m), Gabrnjak (297 m), Dosso Petrinia/Veliki Škrnjak (201 m), Dosso Petrinia inferior/Mali Škrnjak (167 m), Lisičji Vrh (294 m) and the isolated Castelliere di Ceroglie/Ostri Vrh (215 m). Small valleys, carsic swamps and sinkholes are located between the peaks. The small village of Cerovlje, a hamlet of Duino-Aurisina, is located at the foot of the Ermada.

Archaeological finds have shown that pre-historic settlements existed on the top of the Ermada. During the First World War, the Ermada was one of the main Austro-Hungarian bulwarks for the defense of Trieste from September 1916 onwards; heavily fortified with multiple orders of trenches, tunnels, barbed wire and machine gun posts, it was repeatedly assaulted by the Italian Army during the later battles of the Isonzo, but never taken. Streets named after the Ermada, in commemoration of the battles of the First World War, exist in many Italian cities. Today the Ermada is an open-air museum.
