= Alpini Battalion "Val Brenta" =

Inactive Italian Army mountain infantry unit

- Battaglione Alpini "Val Brenta"
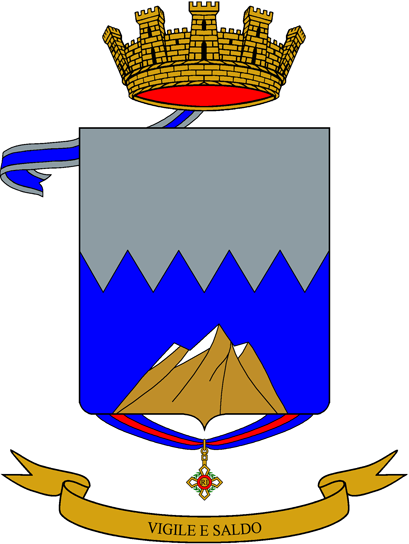
- Battalion coat of arms
- Active: 5 Oct. 1882 – 1 Nov. 1886; 15 Feb. 1915 – 30 April 1920; 2 Sept. 1939 – 31 Oct. 1940; 1 July 1963 – 1 Aug. 1986
- Country: Italy
- Branch: Italian Army
- Type: Mountain Infantry
- Part of: Alpine Brigade "Tridentina"
- Garrison/HQ: Bruneck
- Motto(s): "Vigile e saldo"
- Anniversaries: 2 September 1916
- Decorations: 1× Military Order of Italy; 1× Silver Medal of Military Valor

Insignia
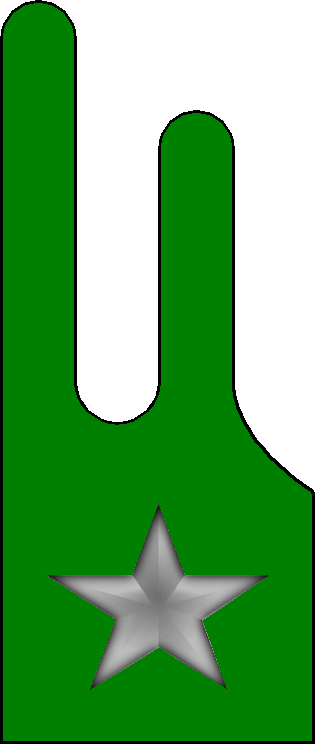
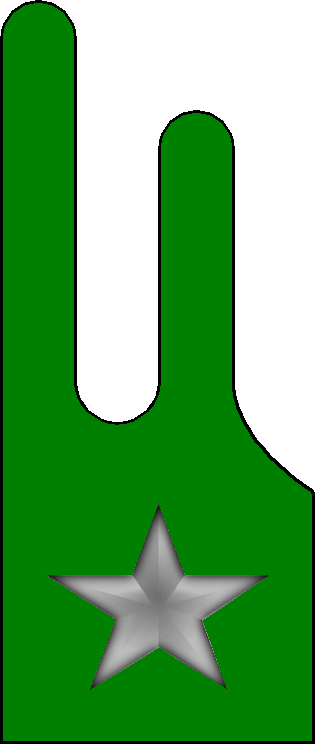
- Alpini gorget patches

The Alpini Battalion "Val Brenta" (Italian: Battaglione Alpini "Val Brenta") is an inactive mountain warfare battalion of the Italian Army based last in Bruneck in South Tyrol. The battalion belongs to the Italian Army's Alpini infantry speciality and was assigned to the Alpine Brigade "Tridentina". In 1882, the Royal Italian Army formed the Battalion "Val Brenta", which four years later was renamed Alpini Battalion "Bassano". In 1915, the army formed a new Alpini Battalion "Val Brenta", which fought in World War I in the alpine areas of the Italian front. The battalion was disbanded in 1920. In September 1939, the "Val Brenta" battalion was reformed and in June 1940 the battalion participated in the Italian invasion of France. At the end of October 1940 the battalion was disbanded.

In 1963, the battalion was reformed and assigned to the 21st Alpini Fortification Grouping. The battalion was tasked with manning the easternmost Alpine Wall fortifications in the upper Puster Valley. In 1964, the battalion incorporated the companies of the disbanded Alpini Battalion "Val Leogra", which were tasked with manning the Alpine Wall fortifications in the central and lower Puster Valley and two of its side valleys. In 1976, the battalion incorporated the companies of the disbanded Alpini Fortification Battalion "Val Cismon", which were tasked with manning the Alpine Wall fortifications that blocked passage from the Puster Valley to the Cadore area. In 1979, the battalion incorporated the companies of the disbanded Alpini Battalion "Val Chiese", which were tasked with manning the Alpine Wall fortifications that blocked passage over the Brenner Pass and Reschen Pass, as well as through the Passeier Valley and the Eisack Valley. The battalion was reduced to a reserve unit in 1986 and only the battalion's 262nd Alpini Fortification Company "Val Brenta" remained active until 1992.

The battalion's anniversary falls on 2 September 1916, when the battalion defended the recently conquered summit of Monte Cauriol against two Austro-Hungarian counterattacks.

== History ==
On 5 October 1882, the Royal Italian Army's 4th Alpini Regiment formed the Battalion "Val Brenta" in Bassano. The battalion recruited in the Brenta valley in Veneto. On 1 April 1885, the battalion was transferred to the 6th Alpini Regiment. On 1 November 1886, the Alpini battalions changed their names from their recruiting zones to the cities and towns, where their base was located. Consequently the Battalion "Val Brenta" was renamed Alpini Battalion "Bassano".

=== World War I ===
At the outbreak of World War I Italy declared its neutrality. In January 1915, the existing Alpini battalions began with the formation of a reserve battalion, with men, who had completed their military service at least four years, but not more than eleven years prior. These reserve battalions were named for a valley (Italian: Valle; abbreviated Val) located near their associated regular Alpini battalion's base, and the reserve battalions wore the same Nappina on their Cappello Alpino as their associated regular Alpini battalion. On 15 February 1915, the "Bassano" battalion formed the Alpini Battalion "Val Brenta", which initially consisted of the 262nd and 263rd Alpini Company. On 15 December 1916, the 274th Alpini Company joined the battalion.

On 23 May 1915, Italy declared war on Austro-Hungary and the Alpini Battalion "Val Brenta" occupied position on the Asiago plateau. As the mountainous terrain of the Italian front made the deployment of entire Alpini regiments impracticable the Alpini battalions were employed either independently or assigned to groups, groupings, or infantry divisions as needed. In May 1916, the battalion fought in the Battle of Asiago and in September of the same year occupied the recently conquered summit of Monte Cauriol. On 2–3 September 1916, the battalion defeated two Austro-Hungarian counterattacks. In the heavy fighting the battalion lost seven officers and 250 Alpini. In 1917, the battalion fought in the Battle of Monte Grappa.

For its conduct and sacrifice on Monte Cauriol on 2–3 September 1916 the Alpini Battalion "Val Brenta" was awarded a Silver Medal of Military Valor, which was affixed to the flag of the 6th Alpini Regiment and added to the regiment's coat of arms.

=== Interwar years ===
After the conclusion of World War I the "Val Brenta" battalion was sent to South Tyrol on occupation duty. On 25 June 1919, the battalion arrived in Bolzano. On 1 February 1920, the battalion moved to Mals and Glurns in the upper Vinschgau valley. On 30 April 1920, the Alpini Battalion "Val Brenta" was disbanded and its remaining personnel transferred to the Alpini Battalion "Bassano".

On 1 July 1921, the Royal Italian Army formed the command of the 9th Alpini Regiment, which received on the same date four existing Alpini battalions, including the Alpini Battalion "Bassano". On 25 September 1937, the Alpini Battalion "Bassano" was transferred to the newly formed 11th Alpini Regiment.

=== World War II ===
On 2 September 1939, one day after the German Invasion of Poland had begun, the 11th Alpini Regiment reformed the Alpini battalions "Val Brenta", "Val Fassa", and "Val Venosta". The three battalions were assigned to the 6th Alpini Group, with which they participated in June 1940 in the Italian invasion of France. On 31 October 1940, the three battalions were disbanded.

=== Cold War ===
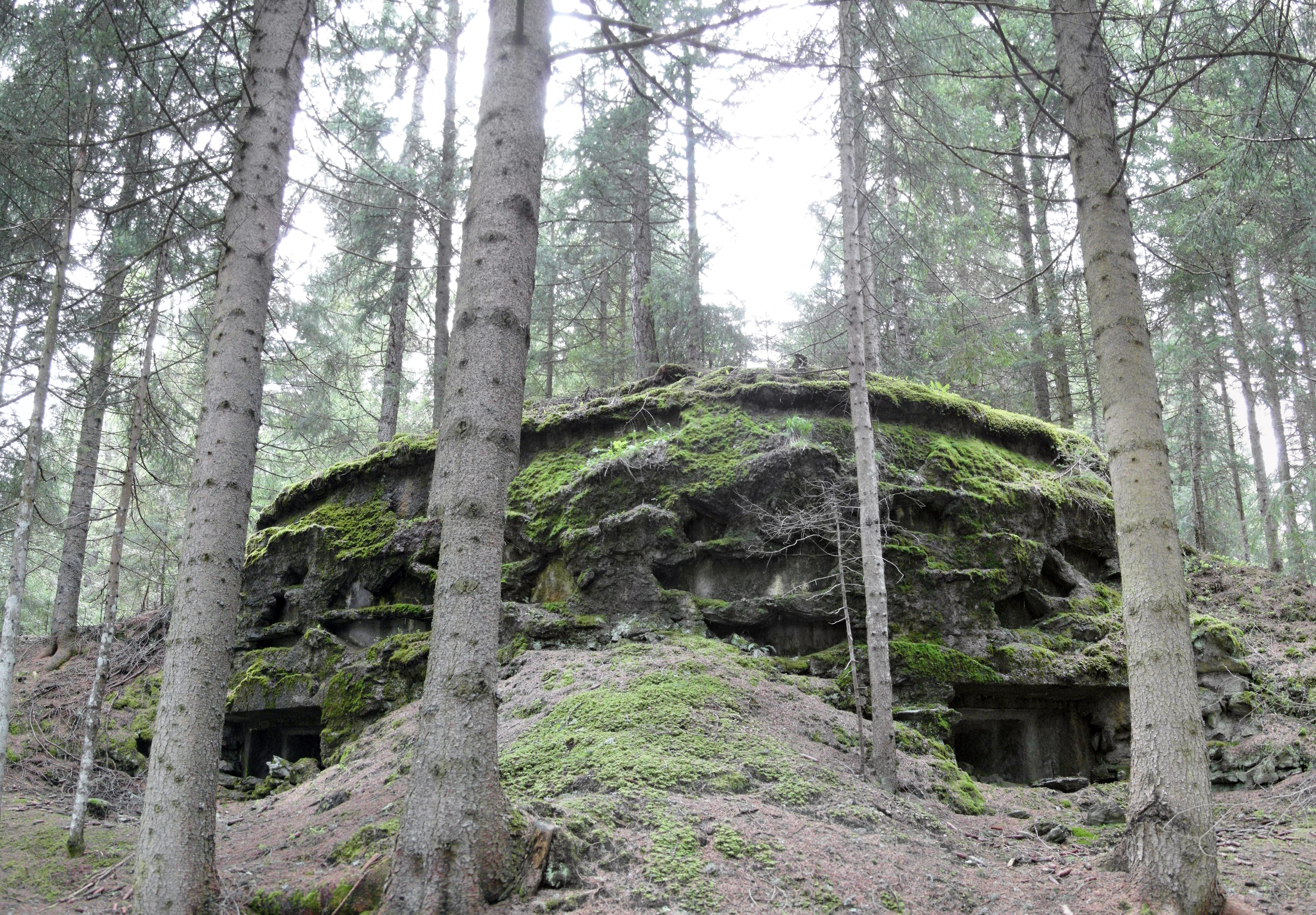
Alpine wall bunker in Vierschach

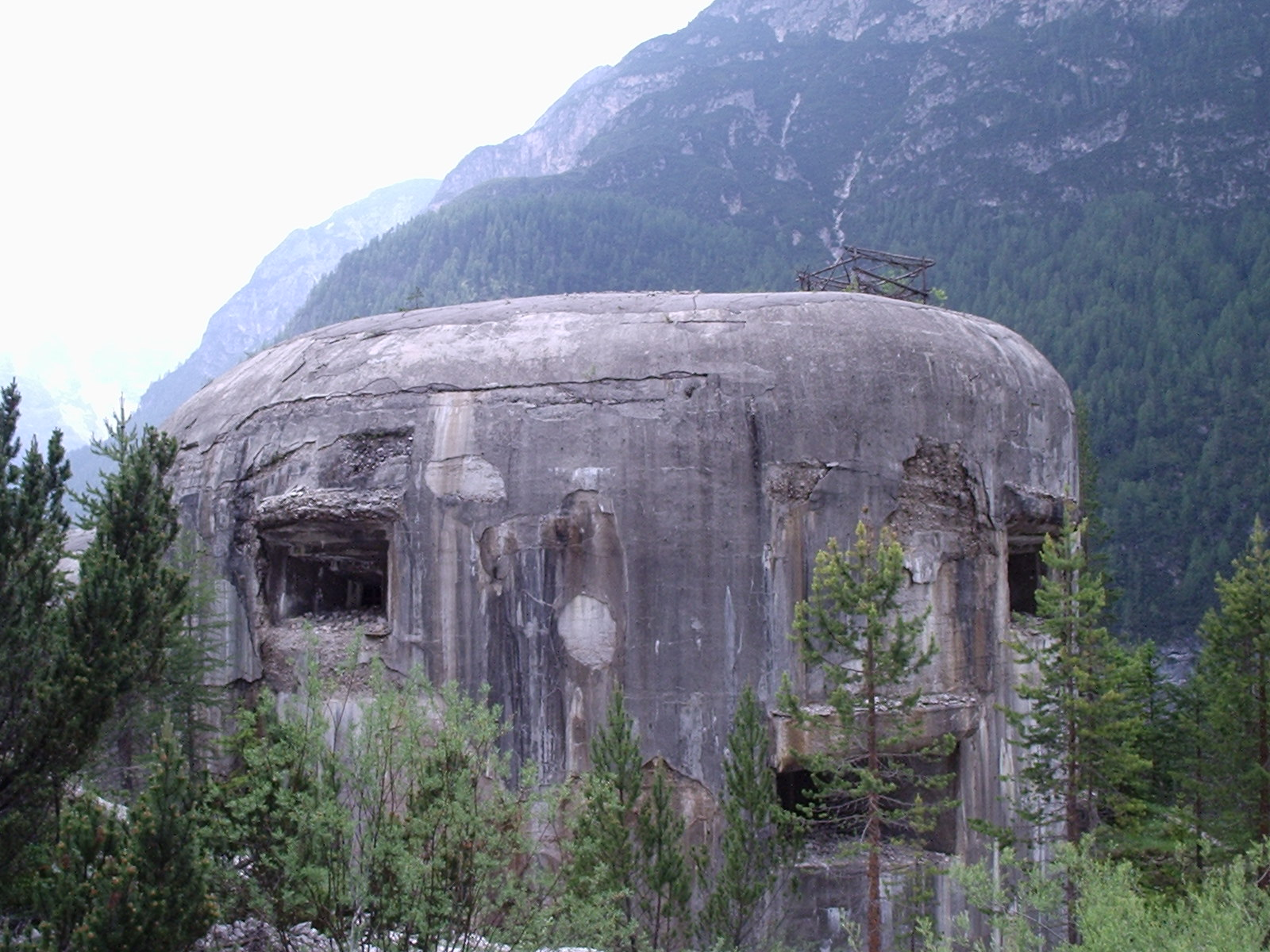
Alpine wall bunker at Landro

On 15 January 1952, the Italian Army formed the XXI Position Battalion in Toblach. On 1 September of the same year the battalion was redesignated as 21st Frontier Grouping. The grouping consisted of the I and II barrier groups, which manned the fortifications and bunkers of the Alpine Wall in the upper Puster Valley. On 1 July 1953, the grouping formed the III Barrier Group and on 1 September of the same year the grouping joined the Alpine Brigade "Tridentina". Afterwards the grouping moved from Toblach to Bruneck. On 26 April 1954, the 12th Frontier Grouping was disbanded and that grouping's III Barrier Group in San Stefano di Cadore joined the 21st Frontier Grouping. On 1 July of the same year, the barrier group in San Stefano di Cadore became an autonomous unit and was redesignated Barrier Group "Cadore".

On 1 January 1957, the 21st Frontier Grouping was renamed 21st Alpini Position Grouping and the following 7 April the grouping received its flag. On 1 September of the same year, the grouping's three barrier groups were renumbered as XXIII, XXIV, and XXV Alpini position battalions. The XXIII Alpini Position Battalion was based in Innichen and tasked with maintaining and, in case of war, manning the Alpine wall positions at Winnebach, Vierschach, and Toblach, which blocked passage through the upper Drava valley. The XXIV Alpini Position Battalion was based in Toblach and tasked with maintaining and, in case of war, manning the Alpine wall positions at Prags and Landro Nord, which blocked passage through the Höhlensteintal. The XXV Alpini Position Battalion was based in Bruneck and tasked with maintaining and, in case of war, manning the Alpine wall positions at Olang, Percha, and Mühlbach, which blocked the passage through the central and lower Puster Valley, as well as the Alpine wall position in Antholz, which blocked passage through the upper Antholz Valley, and the Alpine wall position in Saalen, which blocked the entrance of the Val Badia. At the same time the Barrier Group "Cadore" was renamed XIX Alpini Position Battalion.

On 1 January 1963, the 21st Alpini Position Grouping was renamed 21st Alpini Fortification Grouping. On 1 July 1963, the XXIII Alpini Position Battalion was renamed Alpini Battalion "Val Brenta", the XXIV Alpini Position Battalion was renamed Alpini Battalion "Val d'Adige", and the XXV Alpini Position Battalion was renamed Alpini Battalion "Val Leogra". On the same date the Alpini Battalion "Val d'Adige" was reduced to a reserve unit. At the same time the XIX Alpini Position Battalion was renamed Alpini Battalion "Val Cismon".

On 30 June 1964, the 21st Alpini Fortification Grouping, the Alpini Battalion "Val d'Adige", and the Alpini Battalion "Val Leogra" were disbanded. The two companies of the Alpini Battalion "Val d'Adige" were transferred to the Alpini Battalion "Val Cismon", while the five companies of the Alpini Battalion "Val Leogra" were transferred to the Alpini Battalion "Val Brenta". On the same day the flag of the 21st Alpini Fortification Grouping was transferred to the Alpini Battalion "Val Brenta" for safekeeping. The battalion consisted now of a command, a command platoon, two active companies (262nd and 263rd), and six reserve companies (274th, 351st, 352nd, 353rd, 354th, and 355th).

On 1 November 1970, the Alpini Battalion "Val Brenta" was renamed Alpini Fortification Battalion "Val Brenta". During the 1975 army reform the army disbanded the regimental level and newly independent battalions were granted for the first time their own flags. On 30 June 1975, the Alpini Fortification Battalion "Val Cismon" was disbanded and the next day the battalion's 264th Alpini Fortification Company became an autonomous unit and was renamed 264th Alpini Fortification Company "Val Cismon". On 30 September 1975, the 6th Alpini Regiment in Bruneck was disbanded and the next day, 1 October 1975, the command of the Alpini Fortification Battalion "Val Brenta" and the battalion's 263rd Alpini Fortification Company moved from Innichen to the Bruneck.

On 1 November 1976, the 264th Alpini Fortification Company "Val Cismon" was transferred from the Alpine Brigade "Cadore" to the Alpini Fortification Battalion "Val Brenta". On 12 November 1976, the President of the Italian Republic Giovanni Leone assigned with decree 846 the flag and traditions of the 21st Alpini Fortification Grouping to the Alpini Fortification Battalion "Val Brenta". At the same time the medals and military honors awarded to the "Val Brenta" battalion were transferred from the flag of the 6th Alpini Regiment to the battalion's flag, while the medals and military honors awarded to the entire regiment were duplicated for the flag of the battalion. Consequently, the "Val Brenta" battalion's flag was decorated with one Military Order of Italy and one Silver Medal of Military Valor. The two awards were also added to the battalion's newly created coat of arms. The Alpini Fortification Battalion "Val Brenta" consisted now of nine reserve companies and the following active units:

- Alpini Fortification Battalion "Val Brenta", in Bruneck
  - Command and Services Company, in Bruneck
  - 262nd Alpini Fortification Company, in Innichen
  - 263rd Maintenance and Surveillance Company, in Bruneck
  - 264th Alpini Fortification Company "Val Cismon", in San Stefano di Cadore

On 30 June 1979, the 264th Alpini Fortification Company "Val Cismon" was disbanded and its duties taken over by the 262nd Alpini Fortification Company, which the next day was renamed 262nd Alpini Fortification Company "Val Cismon". The same day, 30 June 1979, the Alpini Fortification Battalion "Val Chiese" in Sterzing was disbanded. The next day, 1 July 1979, the battalion's 253rd Alpini Fortification Company was renamed 253rd Alpini Fortification Company "Val Chiese" and joined the Alpini Fortification Battalion "Val Brenta". The Alpini Fortification Battalion "Val Brenta" consisted now of the following active units:

- Alpini Fortification Battalion "Val Brenta", in Bruneck
  - Command and Services Company, in Bruneck
  - 253rd Alpini Fortification Company "Val Chiese", in Sterzing
  - 262nd Alpini Fortification Company "Val Cismon", in Innichen
  - 263rd Maintenance and Surveillance Company, in Bruneck

With the arrival of the 264th Alpini Fortification Company "Val Cismon" and the 253rd Alpini Fortification Company "Val Chiese" the Alpini Fortification Battalion "Val Brenta" also received the traditions and military awards of the two disbanded battalions. Thus the Gold Medal of Military Valor, Silver Medal of Military Valor, and Bronze Medal of Military Valor awarded to the Alpini Battalion "Val Cismon", as well as the Gold Medal of Military Valor awarded to the Alpini Battalion "Val Chiese" were affixed to the flag of the Alpini Fortification Battalion "Val Brenta".

On 30 June 1985, the 263rd Maintenance and Surveillance Company was disbanded, and the next day, 1 July 1985, the battalion formed the 353rd Recruits Training Company. On 1 August 1986, the Alpini Fortification Battalion "Val Brenta" became a reserve unit and the flag of the 21st Alpini Fortification Grouping was transferred to the Shrine of the Flags in the Vittoriano in Rome. At the Shrine of the Flags the military awards awarded to the Alpini battalions "Val Cismon" and "Val Chiese" were removed from the flag of the 21st Alpini Fortification Grouping and returned to the respective flags of the two Alpini battalions. The same day, 1 August 1986, the "Val Brenta" battalion's 262nd Alpini Fortification Company "Val Cismon" was renamed 262nd Alpini Fortification Company "Val Brenta" and assigned to the Alpine Brigade "Tridentina", while the 353rd Recruits Training Company joined the Alpini Battalion "Trento".

After the end of the Cold War the 262nd Alpini Fortification Company "Val Brenta" removed weapons and equipment from the bunkers and fortifications, and then in 1992 the company was disbanded.

== Fortifications ==
After 1 November 1976, the Alpini Fortification Battalion "Val Brenta" was responsible for all Alpine Wall fortifications and barriers in the Puster Valley and its side valleys, as well as two barriers in the Cadore area. The fortifications were divided into three readiness categories designated Type A, Type B, and Type C:

- Type A = fortification fully equipped and provisioned, with its personnel and close support platoon onsite (On 1 September 1976 the three Type A fortifications in the sector of the "Val Brenta" battalion were re-categorized as Type B)
- Type B = fortification fully equipped and provisioned, with its personnel onsite, while the close support platoon was a reserve unit
- Type C = fortification fully equipped, but not provisioned, with its personnel and close support platoon both being reserve units

The following lists all the barriers grouped by their original Alpini battalions, followed by the link to the Italian wikipedia's article about the barrier in brackets:

- Alpini Battalion "Val Brenta", in Innichen
  - Barrier Winnebach: 9 bunker, 203 men, Type A — 262nd Alpini Company (Sbarramento Prato Drava)
  - Barrier Vierschach: 6 bunker, 180 men, Type A — 263rd Alpini Company (Sbarramento Versciaco)
  - Barrier Toblach: 10 bunker, 304 men, Type C — 274th Alpini Company (Sbarramento Dobbiaco)
- Alpini Battalion "Val d'Adige", in Toblach
  - Barrier Landro Nord: 3 bunker, 150 men, Type C — 256th Alpini Company (renumbered 277th Alpini Company when transferred to the Alpini Battalion "Val Cismon"; Sbarramento Landro)
  - Barrier Prags: 2 bunker, 116 men, Type C — 257th Alpini Company (renumbered 347th Alpini Company, when transferred to the Alpini Battalion "Val Cismon"; Sbarramento Braies)
- Alpini Battalion "Val Leogra", in Bruneck
  - Barrier Antholz: 6 bunker, 164 men, Type C — 351st Alpini Company (Sbarramento Anterselva)
  - Barrier Olang: 10 bunker, 373 men, Type C — 352nd Alpini Company (Sbarramento Rasun-Valdaora)
  - Barrier Percha: 7 bunker, 223 men, Type C — 353rd Alpini Company (Sbarramento Perca)
  - Barrier Saalen: 4 bunker, 113 men, Type C — 354th Alpini Company (Sbarramento Sares)
  - Barrier Mühlbach: 5 bunker, 141 men, Type C — 355th Alpini Company (Sbarramento Chiusa di Rio)
- Alpini Battalion "Val Cismon", in San Stefano di Cadore
  - Barrier Kreuzbergpass: 7 bunker, 247 men, Type A — 264th Alpini Company (Sbarramento Passo Monte Croce Comelico)
  - Barrier Val Frison: 3 bunker, ? men, Type C — 265th Alpini Company (Sbarramento Val Frison)
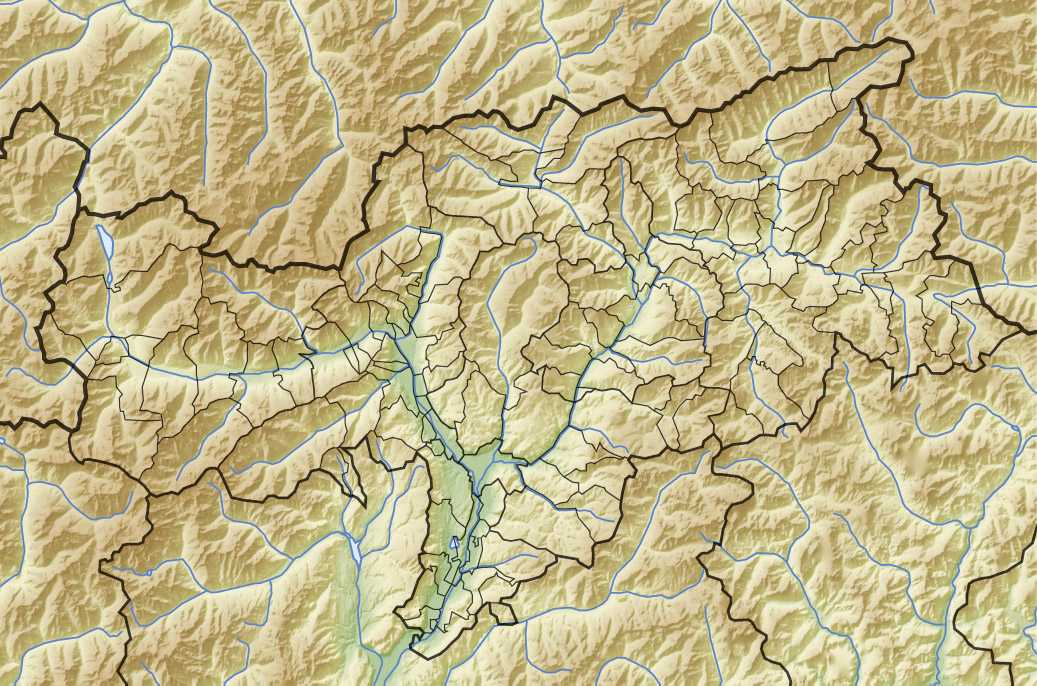
"Val Brenta" (in green), "Val Leogra" (in red), and "Val Cismon" (in blue) fortifications (Val Frison is off map)
