= Alpini Battalion "Val Cismon" =

Inactive Italian Army mountain infantry unit

- Battaglione Alpini "Val Cismon"
- Active: 15 Feb. 1915 – 28 Aug. 1919; 2 Sept. 1939 – 31 Oct. 1940; 2 Jan. 1941 – 8 Sept. 1943; 1 July 1963 – 30 June 1975
- Country: Italy
- Branch: Italian Army
- Type: Mountain Infantry
- Part of: Alpine Brigade "Cadore"
- Garrison/HQ: San Stefano di Cadore
- Decorations: 1× Military Order of Italy; 1× Gold Medal of Military Valor; 1× Silver Medal of Military Valor; 1× Bronze Medal of Military Valor

Insignia
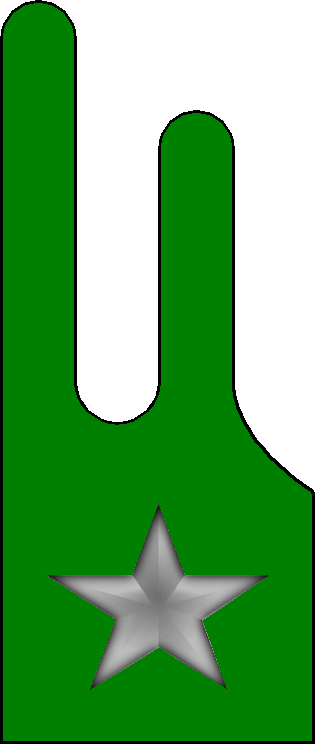
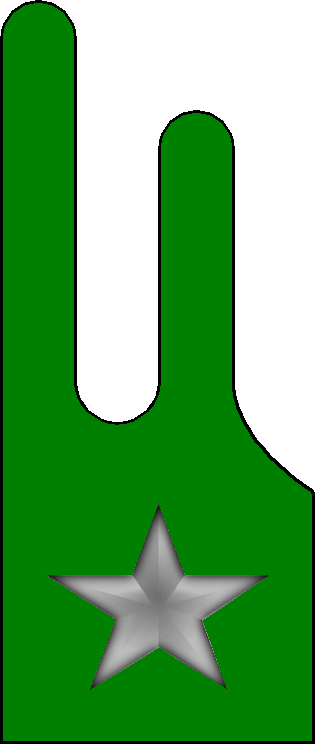
- Alpini gorget patches

The Alpini Battalion "Val Cismon" (Italian: Battaglione Alpini "Val Cismon") is an inactive mountain warfare battalion of the Italian Army based last in San Stefano di Cadore in Veneto. The battalion belongs to the Italian Army's Alpini infantry speciality and was assigned to the Alpine Brigade "Cadore". In 1915, the Royal Italian Army's 7th Alpini Regiment formed the Alpini Battalion "Val Cismon", which fought in World War I in the alpine areas of the Italian front. The battalion was disbanded in 1919.

In September 1939, the "Val Cismon" battalion was reformed and in June 1940 the battalion participated in the Italian invasion of France. At the end of October 1940 the battalion was disbanded. The battalion was reformed again in January 1941 and sent to Albania to reinforce the 7th Alpini Regiment, which was suffering heavy casualties in the Greco-Italian War. In summer 1942, the "Val Cismon" battalion deployed with the 9th Alpini Regiment to the Eastern Front, where the regiment and "Val Cismon" battalion were almost completely destroyed during the Red Army's Operation Little Saturn in winter 1942–43. On 8 September 1943, the Armistice of Cassibile was announced and invading German forces disbanded the 9th Alpini Regiment and its battalions.

In 1963, the battalion was reformed and tasked with manning the Alpine Wall fortifications on the Kreuzbergpass, which blocked passage through the Sexten Valley into Cadore, and the fortifications in the Val Frison. In 1964, the "Val Cismon" battalion received the companies of the disbanded Alpini Battalion "Val d'Adige", which were tasked with manning the Alpine Wall fortifications that blocked passage through the Höhlensteintal into Cadore. In 1975, the battalion was disbanded and its 264th Alpini Fortification Company joined the Alpini Fortification Battalion "Val Brenta". In 1979, the 264th Alpini Fortification Company was disbanded. With one Military Order of Italy, one Gold Medal of Military Valor, one Silver Medal of Military Valor, and one Bronze Medal of Military Valor the Alpini Battalion "Val Cismon" is the highest decorated Alpini Valle battalion.

== History ==
=== World War I ===
At the outbreak of World War I Italy declared its neutrality. In January 1915, the existing Alpini battalions began with the formation of a reserve battalion, with men, who had completed their military service at least four years, but not more than eleven years prior. These reserve battalions were named for a valley (Italian: Valle; abbreviated Val) located near their associated regular Alpini battalion's base, and the reserve battalions wore the same Nappina on their Cappello Alpino as their associated regular Alpini battalion. On 15 February 1915, the 7th Alpini Regiment's Alpini Battalion "Feltre" formed the Alpini Battalion "Val Cismon", which initially consisted of the 264th and 265th Alpini Company. In November 1915, the 277th Alpini Company joined the battalion.

On 23 May 1915, Italy declared war on Austro-Hungary and the Alpini Battalion "Val Cismon" was located in the upper Cismon Valley and the next day occupied occupied position Monte Pavione. On 9 June 1915, the battalion occupied Fiera di Primiero and Imer in Trentino. The rest of the year the battalion was deployed in the area of Forcella Magna and on Cimon Rava. As the mountainous terrain of the Italian front made the deployment of entire Alpini regiments impracticable the Alpini battalions were employed either independently or assigned to groups, groupings, or infantry divisions as needed. Between 22 and 27 August 1916, the "Val Cismon" battalion supported the attack of the Alpini Battalion "Feltre" and Alpini Battalion Monte Pavione towards Monte Cauriol, which was conquered on the 27th. For the next months, until 1 March 1917, the Alpini battalions "Feltre" and "Val Cismon" alternated on the summit of Monte Cauriol.

In November and December 1917, after the disastrous Battle of Caporetto and following the retreat to the Piave river, the "Val Cismon" battalion was deployed on the Monte Grappa massif, where it fought in the First Battle of Monte Grappa. During the battle, between 14 November and 18 December 1917, the "Val Cismon" battalion defended positions on Monte Tomatico, Monte Solarolo, and Monte Valderoa against a series of Austro-Hungarian attacks that cost the battalion 591 casualties. In 1918, the battalion remained on Monte Grappa and fought in the Second Battle of Monte Grappa and Third Battle of Monte Grappa. For its conduct during the First Battle of Monte Grappa the Alpini Battalion "Val Cismon" was awarded a Bronze Medal of Military Valor, which was affixed to the flag of the 7th Alpini Regiment and added to the regiment's coat of arms.

=== Interwar years ===
On 28 August 1919, the Alpini Battalion "Val Cismon" was disbanded. In 1921, the Alpini Battalion "Feltre" was transferred from the 7th Alpini Regiment to the newly formed 9th Alpini Regiment. In November 1926, the Alpini Battalion "Feltre" returned to the 7th Alpini Regiment. On 31 December 1935, the 7th Alpini Regiment was transferred to the newly formed 5th Alpine Division "Pusteria".

=== World War II ===
On 2 September 1939, one day after the German Invasion of Poland had begun, the 7th Alpini Regiment reformed the Alpini battalions "Val Cismon", "Val Piave", and "Val Cordevole" were reformed. The three battalions were assigned to the 4th Alpini Group, with which they participated in June 1940 in the Italian invasion of France. On 31 October 1940, the three battalions were disbanded.

==== Greco-Italian War ====
In November 1940, the 5th Alpine Division "Pusteria" was transferred to Albania to shore up the crumbling Italian front during the Greco-Italian War. By late November 1940, the 7th Alpini Regiment entered the front in the Berat sector. In December 1940, the regiment suffered heavy losses in the Greek counter-offensive. As reinforcement the Alpini Battalion "Val Cismon" was reformed on 2 January 1941 and sent to Albania, where it joined the 7th Alpini Regiment on 17 January 1941. The regiment remained at the frontline in Albania until the German invasion of Greece in April 1941. The "Pusteria" division then pursued the retreating Greek forces. For its conduct and service on the Greek front between 17 January and 23 April 1941 the Alpini Battalion "Val Cismon" was awarded a Silver Medal of Military Valor. On 27 April 1941, the battalion "Val Cismon" had been assigned as the regiment's third battalion to the 9th Alpini Regiment, which was assigned to the 3rd Alpine Division "Julia".

On 15 February 1942, the 9th Alpini Regiment formed a support weapons company for each of its three battalions and the Alpini Battalion "Val Cismon" received the 118th Support Weapons Company. These companies were equipped with Breda M37 machine guns, and 45mm Mod. 35 and 81mm Mod. 35 mortars.

==== Eastern Front ====
On 2 March 1942, the 3rd Alpine Division "Julia" was assigned, together with the 2nd Alpine Division "Tridentina" and 4th Alpine Division "Cuneense", to the Alpine Army Corps. The corps was assigned to the Italian 8th Army, which was readied to be deployed in summer 1942 to the Eastern Front.

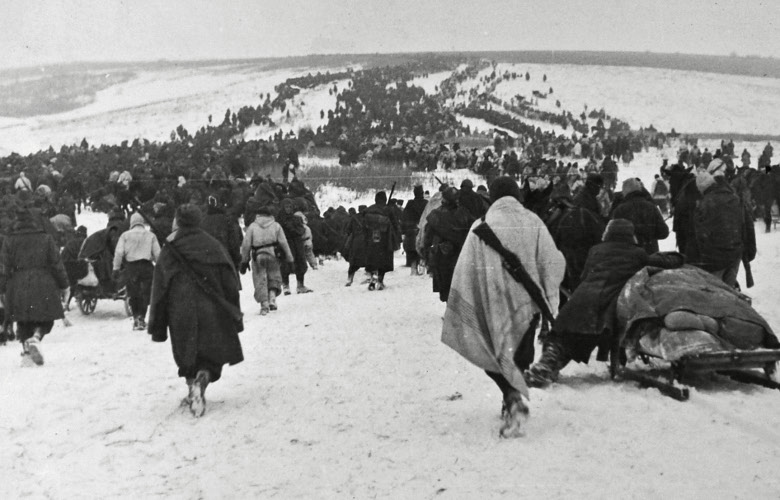
The Alpine Army Corps' retreat in Ukraine in January 1943

In July 1942 the three alpine division arrived in Eastern Ukraine, from where they marched eastwards towards the Don river. The Italian 8th Army covered the left flank of the German 6th Army, which spearheaded the German summer offensive of 1942 towards Stalingrad. On 12 December 1942, the Red Army commenced Operation Little Saturn, which, in its first stage, attacked and encircled the Italian II Army Corps and XXXV Army Corps, to the southeast of the Alpine Army Corps. On 13 January 1943, the Red Army launched the second stage of Operation Little Saturn with the Voronezh Front encircling and destroying the Hungarian Second Army to the northwest of the Alpine Army Corps.

On the evening of 17 January 1943, the Alpine Army Corps commander, General Gabriele Nasci, ordered a full retreat. At this point only the 2nd Alpine Division "Tridentina" was still capable of conducting combat operations. The 40,000-strong mass of stragglers — Alpini and Italians from other commands, plus German and Hungarians — followed the "Tridentina", which led the way westwards to the new Axis lines. As the Soviets had already occupied every village, bitter battles had to be fought to clear the way. On the morning of 26 January 1943, the spearheads of the "Tridentina" reached the hamlet of Nikolayevka, occupied by the Soviet 48th Guards Rifle Division. The Soviets had fortified the railway embankment on both sides of the village. General Nasci ordered a frontal assault and by nightfall the troops of the "Tridentina" division had managed to break through the Soviet lines. The Italian troops continued their retreat, which was no longer contested by Soviet forces. On 1 February 1943 the remnants of the Alpine Army Corps reached Axis lines.

For its bravery and sacrifice in the Soviet Union the 9th Alpini Regiment was awarded a Gold Medal of Military Valor, which was affixed to the regiment's flag and added to the regiment's coat of arms.

The 9th Alpini Regiment was still in the process of being rebuilt, when the Armistice of Cassibile was announced on 8 September 1943 and the same day the regiment was disbanded by invading German forces.

=== Cold War ===
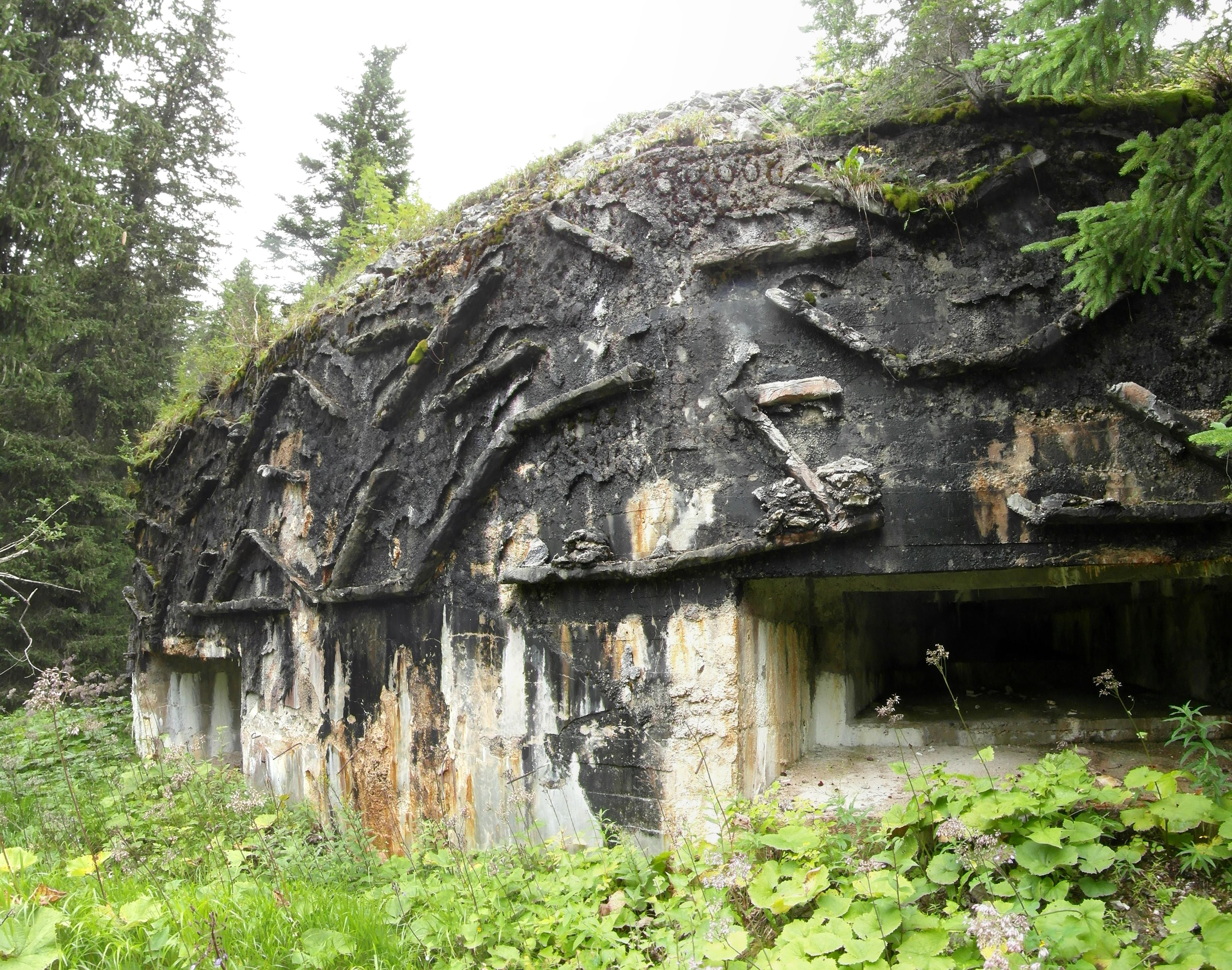
Alpine wall bunker at the Kreuzbergpass

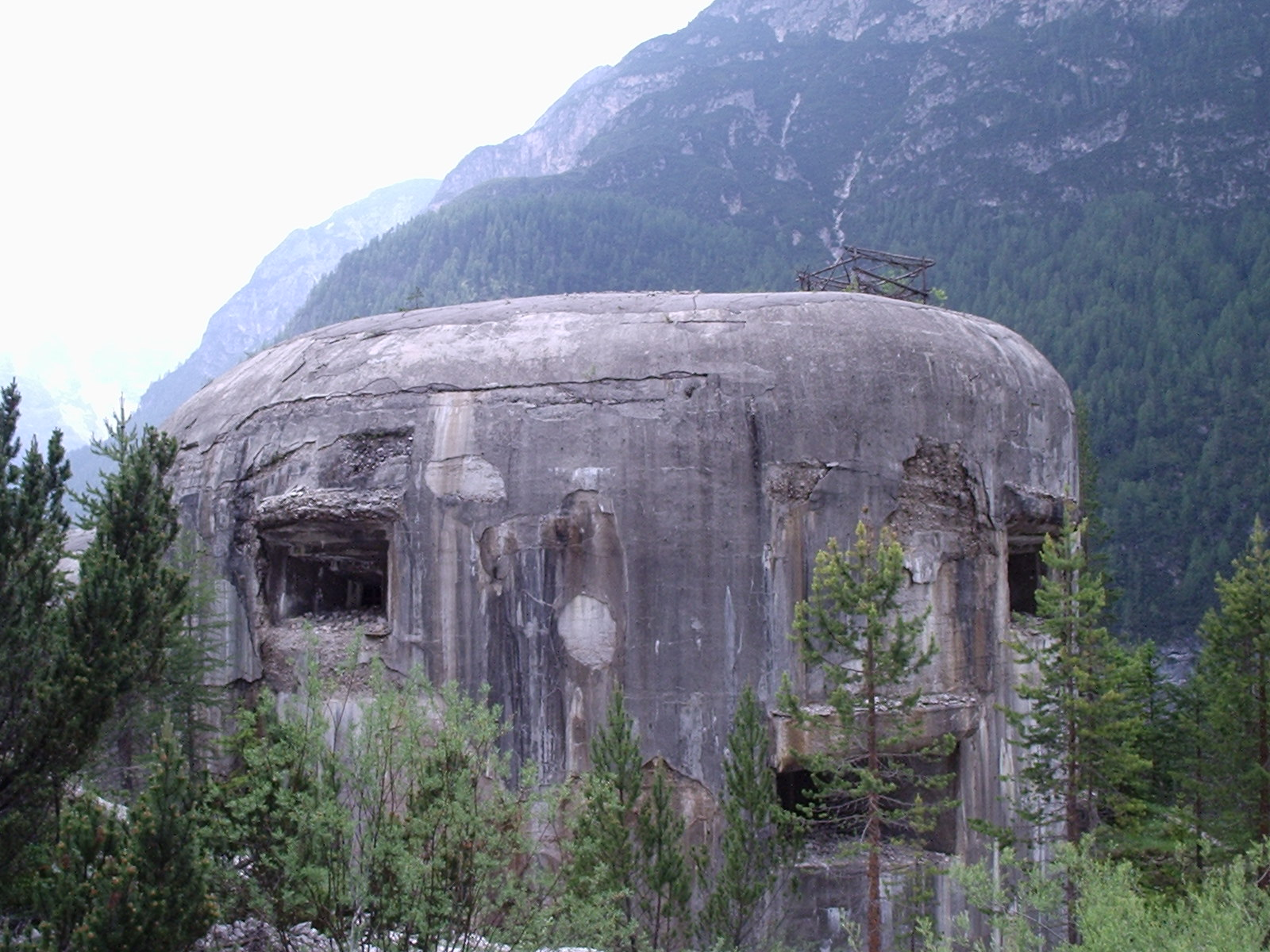
Alpine wall bunker at Landro

In 1953, the Italian Army's 12th Frontier Grouping in Paluzza formed the III Barrier Group, which in the course of the same year moved to San Stefano di Cadore. The group was tasked with manning the Alpine Wall fortifications on the Kreuzbergpass, which blocked passage through the Sexten Valley into Cadore, and the fortifications in the Val Frison. On 26 April 1954, the 12th Frontier Grouping was disbanded and the III Barrier Group joined the 21st Frontier Grouping. On 1 July of the same year, the III Barrier Group became an autonomous unit and was renamed Barrier Group "Cadore".

On 1 September 1957, the Barrier Group "Cadore" was redesignated XIX Alpini Position battalion and assigned to the Alpine Brigade "Cadore". On 1 July 1963, the XIX Alpini Position Battalion was renamed Alpini Battalion "Val Cismon". The battalion consisted of a command, a command company, the 264th Alpini Company, which was tasked with the defense of the Kreuzbergpass, and the 265th Alpini Company, which was a reserve company and tasked with the defense of the Val Frison. On 30 June 1964, the Alpini Battalion "Val d'Adige" was disbanded and the next day the two companies of the battalion joined the Alpini Battalion "Val Cismon". The two companies were tasked with maintaining and, in case of war, manning the Alpine wall positions at Prags and Landro Nord, which blocked passage through the Höhlensteintal into Cadore. The battalion then consisted of the following units:

- Alpini Battalion "Val Cismon", in San Stefano di Cadore
  - Command Platoon, in San Stefano di Cadore
  - 264th Alpini Company, in San Stefano di Cadore
  - 265th Alpini Company (Reserve), in San Stefano di Cadore
  - 267th Alpini Company (Reserve), in Toblach
  - 347th Alpini Company (Reserve), in Toblach

On 1 November 1970, the Alpini Battalion "Val Cismon" was renamed Alpini Fortification Battalion "Val Cismon". During the 1975 army reform the Alpini Fortification Battalion "Val Cismon" was disbanded on 30 June 1975. The next day the battalion's 264th Alpini Fortification Company became an autonomous unit and was renamed 264th Alpini Fortification Company "Val Cismon". On 1 November 1976, the 264th Alpini Fortification Company "Val Cismon" was transferred from the Alpine Brigade "Cadore" to the Alpini Fortification Battalion "Val Brenta".

With the arrival of the 264th Alpini Fortification Company "Val Cismon" the Alpini Fortification Battalion "Val Brenta" also received the traditions and military awards of the disbanded battalion. Thus the Gold Medal of Military Valor, Silver Medal of Military Valor, and Bronze Medal of Military Valor awarded to the Alpini Battalion "Val Cismon" were affixed to the flag of the Alpini Fortification Battalion "Val Brenta".

On 30 June 1979, the 264th Alpini Fortification Company "Val Cismon" was disbanded and its duties taken over by the 262nd Alpini Fortification Company, which the next day was renamed 262nd Alpini Fortification Company "Val Cismon". On 1 August 1986, the Alpini Fortification Battalion "Val Brenta" became a reserve unit and its flag was transferred to the Shrine of the Flags in the Vittoriano in Rome. The same day, 1 August 1986, the "Val Brenta" battalion's 262nd Alpini Fortification Company "Val Cismon" was renamed 262nd Alpini Fortification Company "Val Brenta", and the medals and traditions of the Alpini Battalion "Val Cismon" were transferred to the Shrine of the Flags in the Vittoriano in Rome for safekeeping.

== Fortifications ==
Until it was disbanded, the Alpini Fortification Battalion "Val Cismon" was responsible for the Alpine Wall fortifications and barriers that blocked the passage into the Cadore area. The fortifications were divided into three readiness categories designated Type A, Type B, and Type C:

- Type A = fortification fully equipped and provisioned, with its personnel and close support platoon onsite (On 1 September 1976 the three Type A fortifications in the sector of the "Val Brenta" battalion were re-categorized as Type B)
- Type B = fortification fully equipped and provisioned, with its personnel onsite, while the close support platoon was a reserve unit
- Type C = fortification fully equipped, but not provisioned, with its personnel and close support platoon both being reserve units

The following lists the barriers grouped by their original Alpini battalions, followed by the link to the Italian Wikipedia's article about the barrier in brackets:

- Alpini Battalion "Val Cismon", in San Stefano di Cadore
  - Barrier Kreuzbergpass: 7 bunker, 247 men, Type A — 264th Alpini Company (Sbarramento Passo Monte Croce Comelico)
  - Barrier Val Frison: 3 bunker, ? men, Type C — 265th Alpini Company (Sbarramento Val Frison)
- Alpini Battalion "Val d'Adige", in Toblach
  - Barrier Landro Nord: 3 bunker, 150 men, Type C — 256th Alpini Company (renumbered 277th Alpini Company when transferred to the Alpini Battalion "Val Cismon"; Sbarramento Landro)
  - Barrier Prags: 2 bunker, 116 men, Type C — 257th Alpini Company (renumbered 347th Alpini Company, when transferred to the Alpini Battalion "Val Cismon"; Sbarramento Braies)
