= Alpine Brigade "Tridentina" =

Former light infantry brigade of Italian Army

Brigata Alpina "Tridentina"
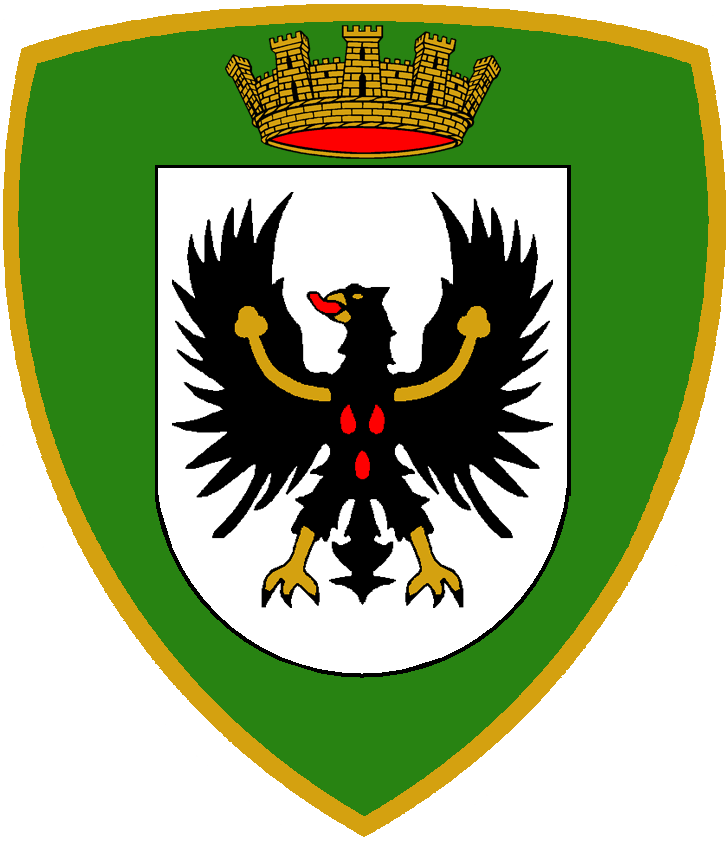
- Coat of Arms of the Alpine Brigade "Tridentina"
- Active: 1 May 1951 - 31 December 2002
- Country: Italy
- Branch: Italian Army
- Type: Alpini
- Role: Mountain Infantry
- Part of: IV Army Corps; 1951 - today
- Garrison/HQ: Brixen

The Alpine Brigade "Tridentina" was a light Infantry brigade of the Italian Army, specializing in mountain warfare. Its core units were Alpini, the mountain infantry corps of the Italian Army, that distinguished itself in combat during World War I and World War II. The Alpine Brigade "Tridentina" carried on the colours and traditions of the WWII 2nd Alpine Division "Tridentina".

The brigade was based in the eastern half of the Italian province of South Tyrol, with its headquarters in the city of Brixen. The brigade was disbanded in 2002, however the name and traditions were transferred to the newly raised Division "Tridentina", a deployable military headquarters of the Italian Army.

== Constitution ==
The "Tridentina" was constituted on 1 May 1951 in the city of Brixen. The brigade’s name was taken from the name Venezia Tridentina, which was the name invented by the linguist Graziadio Isaia Ascoli for the region of Trentino-Alto Adige/Südtirol and was officially in use for the area between 1919 and 1948. Accordingly, the brigade's coat of arms is based on the coat of arms of the region's capital city Trento. The brigade was based entirely within the region and drew the majority of its recruits from it. The brigade was tasked with defending the Puster Valley, ensuring that invading Warsaw Pact troops would be unable to cut the vital supply line over the Brenner Pass. To aid in the defense of the valley part of the pre-WWII fortifications of the Alpine Wall were reactivated and upgraded. The brigade’s strength was around 4,200 men and initially it was composed of the:

- Alpine Brigade "Tridentina", in Brixen
  - Brigade Headquarters, in Brixen
  - 6th Alpini Regiment, in Meran (moved to Bruneck on 1 January 1953)
    - Command Company, in Meran (moved to Bruneck on 1 January 1953)
    - Alpini Battalion "Bolzano", Brixen
    - Alpini Battalion "Trento", in Meran (moved to Bruneck on 1 January 1953)
    - Alpini Battalion "Bassano", in Innichen (activated 10 June 1951)
    - Alpini Battalion "Edolo", in Bruneck (ceded to the reformed 5th Alpini Regiment of the Alpine Brigade "Orobica" on 1 January 1953 and moved to Meran)
    - 6th Mortar Company, in Meran (moved to Bruneck on 1 January 1953)
  - 2nd Mountain Artillery Regiment, in Brixen
    - Command Battery, in Brixen
    - Mountain Artillery Group "Bergamo", in Bruneck (renamed "Vicenza" on 31 December 1952)
    - Mountain Artillery Group "Verona", in Bolzano
    - Mountain Artillery Group "Asiago", in Toblach
  - Services Grouping "Tridentina" (from 1956 onwards)
  - Engineer Company "Tridentina", in Brixen
  - Signal Company "Tridentina", in Brixen
  - Alpini Paratroopers Platoon, in Brixen (activated on 1 September 1952)
  - Light Aircraft Section "Tridentina", in Brixen (formed in 1957 and expanded to Light Aircraft Unit in 1966)

The Tridentina was the first Alpini brigade to receive an Alpini Paratroopers Platoon. The platoon was activated on 1 September 1952 in Brixen and merged with the paratrooper platoons of the other four alpine brigades on 1 April 1964 to form the Alpini Paratroopers Company under direct command of the 4th Army Corps. The same year the 6th Mortar Company was disbanded and its mortars and troops divided among the brigade's three Alpini battalions.

On 4 April 1957 the 21st Frontier Defense Regiment in Bruneck was added to the brigade. It consisted of the battalions:

- XXIII° Battalion (renamed Alpini Battalion "Val Brenta" on 1 July 1963), in Innichen)
- XXIV° Battalion (renamed Alpini Battalion "Val d'Adige" on 1 July 1963), in Toblach)
- XXV° Battalion (renamed Alpini Battalion "Val Leogra" on 1 July 1963), in Bruneck)

The 21st Frontier Defense Regiment was disbanded on 30 June 1964 with the exception of the "Val Brenta" battalion, which absorbed the companies of the "Val Leogra". The companies of the "Val d'Adige" battalion were transferred to the Alpini Battalion "Val Cismon" of the Alpine Brigade "Cadore".

== 1975 Reorganization ==
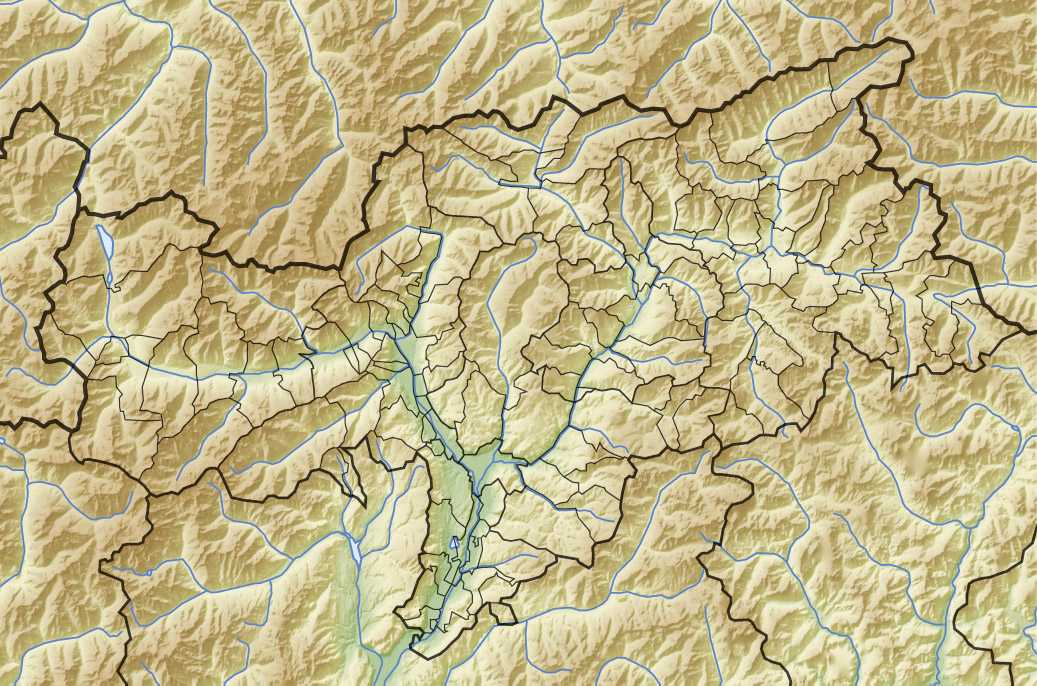
Tridentina locations 1989

With 1975 Italian Army reform the regimental level was abolished and battalions came under direct command of multi-arms brigades. At the same time the army reduced and realigned its forces and therefore the Tridentina saw some changes to its composition: the 6th Alpini Regiment, 2nd Mountain Artillery Regiment, and Mountain Artillery Group "Verona" were disbanded, while the brigade headquarters and the signal company were merged to form the Command and Signal Unit "Tridentina". An anti-tank company was raised, the Light Aircraft Unit "Tridentina" was transferred to the newly formed 4th Army Light Aviation Regiment "Altair" of the 4th Army Corps, the Services Grouping "Tridentina" was reorganized as a logistic battalion, and the Alpini Battalion "Bolzano" was reduced to reserve unit. After the Mountain Artillery Group "Verona" had been disbanded and the 1st Heavy Artillery Group "Adige" moved from Verona into the now vacant base in Elvas.

After the reform the brigade's two Alpini battalions had an authorized strength of 950 men, with the exception of the "Val Brenta" battalion, which was tasked to man fortifications in the Puster and Piave valleys. The "Val Brenta" fielded three active and nine reserve companies with a wartime strength of more than 2,200 men. The two artillery groups had an authorized strength of 610 men and fielded 18 M56 105 mm pack howitzers each. The new composition was:

- Alpine Brigade "Tridentina", in Brixen
  - Command and Signal Unit "Tridentina", in Brixen
  - Alpini Battalion "Trento", in Welsberg
    - Headquarters and Service Company
    - 94th Alpini Company
    - 144th Alpini Company
    - 145th Alpini Company
    - 128th Heavy Mortar Company
  - Alpini Battalion "Bassano", in Innichen
    - Headquarters and Service Company
    - 62nd Alpini Company
    - 63rd Alpini Company
    - 74th Alpini Company
    - 129th Heavy Mortar Company
  - Alpini Battalion "Val Brenta", in Bruneck (put into reserve status on 23 August 1986; only the 262nd Alpini Company remained in active service)
    - Headquarters and Service Company
    - 253rd Alpini Company, in Brenner (transferred on 1 July 1979 from the disbanded Alpini Battalion "Val Chiese" of the Alpine Brigade "Orobica")
    - 262nd Alpini Company, in Winnebach (Type A^{*})
    - 263rd Alpini Company, in Vierschach (Type A)
    - 264th Alpini Company, in Santo Stefano di Cadore (Type A, transferred on 1 November 1976 from the disbanded Alpini Battalion "Val Cismon" of the Alpine Brigade "Cadore"; downgraded to Type C on 30 June 1979 and duties taken over by the 262nd Company)
    - 265th Alpini Company^{note 1}, in Santo Stefano di Cadore (Type C^{*}, transferred on 1 November 1976 from the disbanded Alpini Battalion "Val Cismon")
    - 274th Alpini Company^{note 1}, in Toblach (Type C)
    - 277th Alpini Company^{note 1}, in Höhlenstein (Type C, transferred on 1 November 1976 from the disbanded Alpini Battalion "Val Cismon")
    - 347th Alpini Company^{note 2}, in Prags (Type C, transferred on 1 November 1976 from the disbanded Alpini Battalion "Val Cismon")
    - 351st Alpini Company^{note 2}, in Bruneck (Type C, ex "Val Leogra")
    - 352nd Alpini Company^{note 2}, in Bruneck (Type C, ex "Val Leogra")
    - 353rd Alpini Company^{note 1}, in Percha (Type C, ex "Val Leogra")
    - 354th Alpini Company^{note 2}, in Bruneck (Type C, ex "Val Leogra")
    - 355th Alpini Company^{note 2}, in Bruneck (Type C, ex "Val Leogra")
  - Mountain Artillery Group "Vicenza", in Bruneck (moved to Elvas in 1983)
    - Headquarters and Service Battery
    - 19th Mountain Artillery Battery
    - 20th Mountain Artillery Battery
    - 21st Mountain Artillery Battery
  - Mountain Artillery Group "Asiago", in Toblach
    - Headquarters and Service Battery
    - 28th Mountain Artillery Battery
    - 29th Mountain Artillery Battery
    - 30th Mountain Artillery Battery
  - Logistic Battalion "Tridentina", in Vahrn
    - Command and Services Platoon
    - 1st Light Logistic Unit
    - 2nd Light Logistic Unit
    - Medium Logistic Unit
  - Anti-tank Company "Tridentina", in Bruneck
  - Engineer Company "Tridentina", in Brixen
- _{Type A = fortification fully equipped, provisioned and manned; close support platoon onsite}
- _{Type B = fortification fully equipped, provisioned and manned; close support platoon off site}
- _{Type C = fortification fully equipped; provisions, crew and close support platoon off site}

Note 1: Company was Type A until 1975.
Note 2: Company was Type A until 1964.

=== Strategic plans in case of war ===
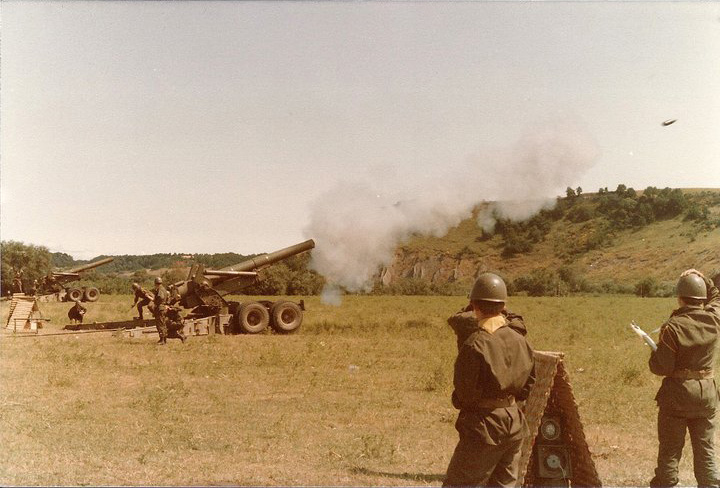
1st Heavy Artillery Group "Adige" firing its M115 howitzers

After the 1975 reform the 4th Alpine Army Corps was responsible to defend the Italian border along the main chain of the alps from the Swiss-Austrian-Italian border tripoint in the west to the Italian-Yugoslavian border in the east. In case of war with Yugoslavia the 4th Alpine Army Corps would remain static in its position guarding the left flank of the 5th Army Corps, which would meet the enemy forces in the plains of Friuli-Venezia Giulia. The only brigade which would have seen combat in such a case would have been the Julia.

In case of a war with the Warsaw Pact the 4th Alpine Army Corps had two war planes: one in the case the Soviet Southern Group of Forces and Hungarian Army would march through Yugoslavia and the other in case the Warsaw Pact would violate the Austrian neutrality and march through Austria. In case the enemy forces would come through Yugoslavia, the Julia would cover the mountainous left flank of the 5th Army Corps, which with its four armoured and five mechanized brigades would try to wear down the enemy before it could break out into the North Italian Padan plain. The other alpine brigades would remain static.

In the more likely case the Soviet and Hungarian divisions would invade Austria and march through Southern Styria and through the Drava valley in Carinthia the alpine brigades would have been the first front line units of the Italian Army. The Julia would have defended the Canal Valley, the Cadore the Piave Valley, while the Orobica had a special mission, and the Taurinense would remain in reserve. The Tridentina was tasked with defending the Puster Valley at all costs. Connected by a low pass to the Drava valley, the Puster valley ends near Brixen, and a Soviet breakthrough there would have cut the important line of communication over the Brenner Pass between the Italian Army and NATO's Central Army Group in Southern Germany. Furthermore, from Brixen Soviet forces could either turn northwards and attack the Southern flank of the Central Army Group or they could turn southwards to Verona and attack the Italian 5th Army Corps in its back. Therefore the Tridentina was the second strongest Alpini brigade. It manned four lines of defence in the Puster Valley and the 4th Alpine Army Corps had an armoured, and a mechanized battalion, as well as the 4th Heavy Field Artillery Regiment, and a self-propelled artillery group in reserve to support the Tridentina.

Furthermore the 1st Heavy Artillery Group "Adige" was based in the village of Elvas near Brixen. The "Adige" was armed with M115 howitzers and in peacetime part of the 3rd Missile Brigade "Aquileia". In case of war the group would have supported the Tridentina with conventional artillery fire, but if a Soviet breakthrough was imminent the "Adige" would have plastered the Puster Valley from beginning to end with W33 nuclear artillery shells, which were stored in the village of Natz at "Site Rigel" by the United States Army's 11th Field Artillery Detachment. The "Adige" had two firing batteries with four howitzers per battery and 140 (!) nuclear artillery shells to fulfil its task. After the introduction of the MGM-52 Lance tactical surface-to-surface missile system in the 1980s the 1st Heavy Artillery Group "Adige" was disbanded on 31 July 1982 and its 8th Battery joining the 9th Heavy Artillery Group "Rovigo" as 3rd Battery "Wolves of Elvas". The "Rovigo" itself lost its nuclear capability in 1986 and in the same year the US Army left Site Rigel.

To aid in the defence of the narrow mountain valleys the 4th Alpine Army Corps re-activated some fortifications of the World War II era Alpine Wall. In the area of operation of the Tridentina the task of maintaining and manning the fortifications fell to the Alpini Battalion "Val Brenta":

- Winnebach: 9 bunker, 203 men, 262nd Alpini Company (Italian Wikipedia: Sbarramento Prato Drava)
- Vierschach: 6 bunker, 180 men, 263rd Alpini Company (Italian Wikipedia: Sbarramento Versciaco)
- Kreuzbergpass: 7 bunker, 247 men, 264th AlpiniCompany (Italian Wikipedia: Sbarramento Passo Monte Croce Comelico)
- Val Frison: 3 bunker, ? men, 265th Alpini Company (Italian Wikipedia: Sbarramento Val Frison)
- Toblach: 10 bunker, 304 men, 274th Alpini Company (Italian Wikipedia: Sbarramento Dobbiaco)
- Landro Nord: 3 bunker, 150 men, 277th Alpini Company (Italian Wikipedia: Sbarramento della Val di Landro)
- Prags: 2 bunker, 116 men, 347th Alpini Company (Italian Wikipedia: Sbarramento di Braies)
- Antholz: 6 bunker, 164 men, 351st Alpini Company (Italian Wikipedia: Sbarramento Anterselva)
- Olang: 10 bunker, 373 men, 352nd Alpini Company (Italian Wikipedia: Sbarramento Rasun-Valdaora)
- Percha: 7 bunker, 223 men, 353rd Alpini Company (Italian Wikipedia: Sbarramento di Perca)
- Saalen: 4 bunker, 113 men, 354th Alpini Company (Italian Wikipedia: Sbarramento di Sares)
- Mühlbach: 5 bunker, 141 men, 355th Alpini Company (Italian Wikipedia: Sbarramento Chiusa di Rio)

As the fortifications manned by the 264th Alpini Company were in the area of operation of the Alpine Brigade "Cadore" information about the 264th Company can be found at the Cadore's article.

On 23 August 1986 the "Val Brenta", with the exception of the 262nd Alpini Company, was disbanded and the bunkers stripped of their equipment. The 262nd Alpini Company was disbanded in 1991.

== 1990s Reorganization ==
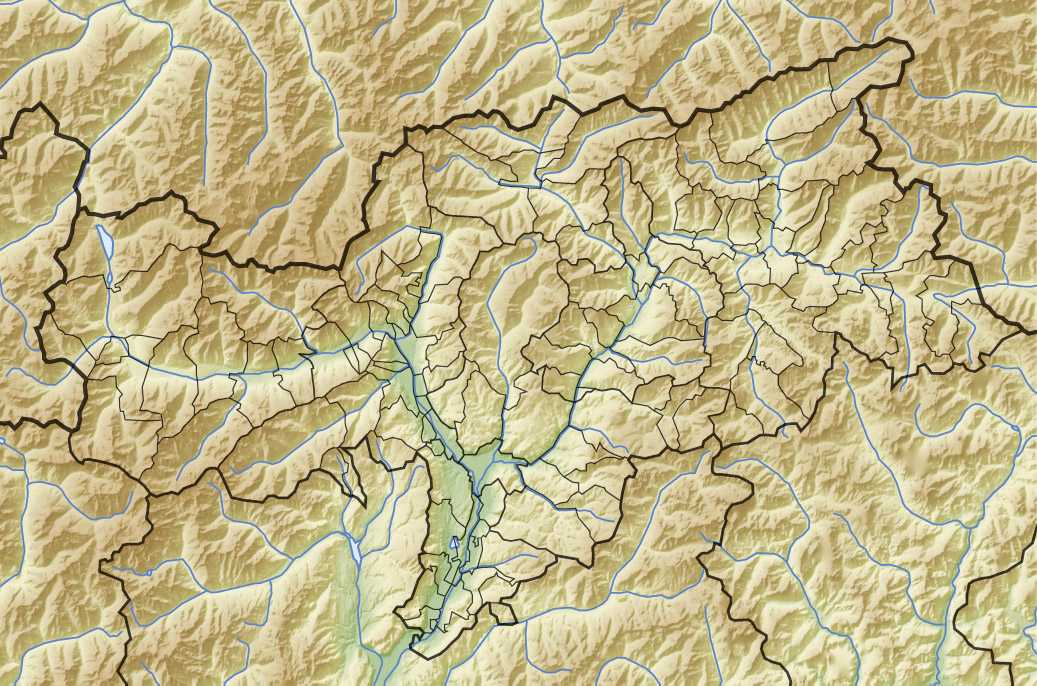
Tridentina locations 1999

In 1991 the "Val Brenta battalion and the "Asiago" group were disbanded. The Mountain Artillery Group "Vicenza" was transferred to the 4th Alpine Army Corps. With the suppression of the Alpine Brigade "Orobica" in 1991, that brigade's remaining units (Alpini battalions "Morbegno" and "Edolo", Mountain Artillery Group "Bergamo", and the Anti-tank Company) passed to the Tridentina. In August 1992 the Anti-tank Company and the 262nd Alpini Company were disbanded and the battalions took the names of historical Alpini regiments to carry on the regimental traditions. Each regiment consisted of one of the brigade's Alpini battalions and an additional support company. Furthermore, in 1993 the Command and Signal Unit "Tridentina" was merged with the Engineer Company into the Command and Tactical Supports Unit "Tridentina". Thus the new composition was:

- Alpine Brigade "Tridentina", in Brixen
  - Command and Tactical Supports Unit "Tridentina", in Brixen
  - 5th Alpini Regiment Alpini Battalion "Morbegno", in Sterzing
  - 6th Alpini Regiment Alpini Battalion "Bassano", in Innichen
  - 11th Alpini Regiment Alpini Battalion "Trento", in Welsberg
  - Alpini (Recruits Training) Battalion "Edolo", in Merano (renamed 18th Regiment "Edolo" on September 13, 1997; passed to the Alpine Troops Command on 1 March 1998)
  - 5th Mountain Artillery Regiment Mountain Artillery Group "Bergamo", in Merano
  - Logistic Battalion "Tridentina", in Brixen

== Today ==
In 2001 5th Mountain Artillery Regiment was disbanded, followed by the 11th Alpini Regiment on 8 March 2002. During 2002 the following units of the brigade passed to other commands:

- 5th Alpini Regiment to the Alpine Brigade "Julia"
- 6th Alpini Regiment to the Alpine Troops Command

The brigade and its remaining units were disbanded on 31 December 2002. The next day the Division Command "Tridentina" was activated in Bolzano which carried on the traditions of the 2nd Alpine Division "Tridentina" and the Alpine Brigade "Tridentina".
