= Alpine Brigade "Cadore" =

Brigata Alpina "Cadore"
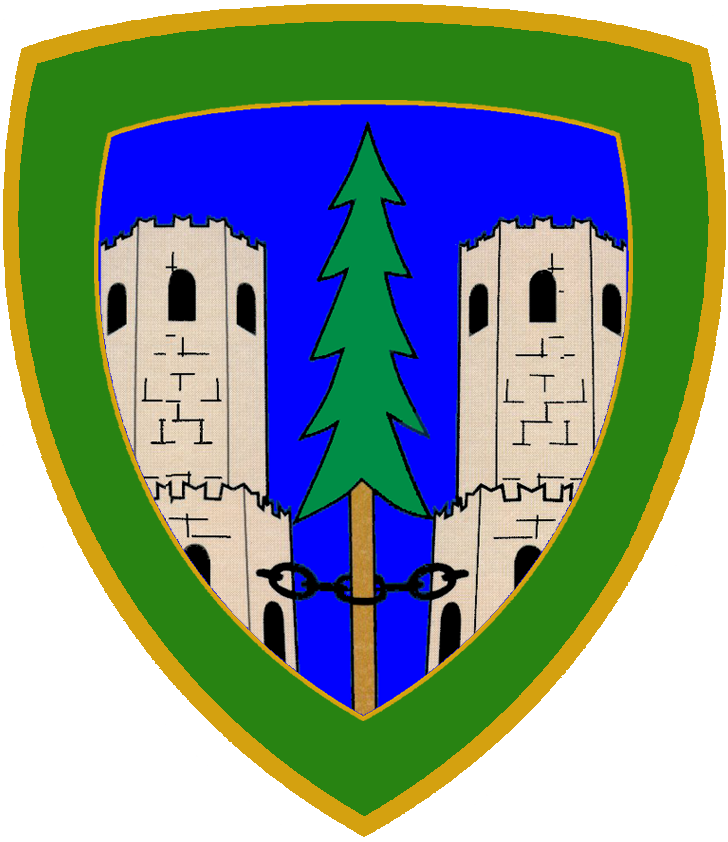
- Coat of Arms of the Alpine Brigade "Cadore"
- Active: 1 Dec. 1953 - 31 Jan. 1997
- Country: Italy
- Branch: Italian Army
- Type: Alpini
- Role: Mountain Infantry
- Part of: IV Army Corps; 1953 - 1997
- Garrison/HQ: Belluno

The Alpine Brigade "Cadore" was a light Infantry brigade of the Italian Army, specializing in mountain warfare. Its core units were Alpini, the mountain infantry corps of the Italian Army, that distinguished itself in combat during World War I and World War II. The brigade was based in the Italian provinces of Belluno and Vicenza with its headquarters Belluno. The brigade was disbanded in 1997.

Based in the Cadore Alps of Northern Italy the brigade's coat of arms was modeled after the area's traditional coat of arms.

== Constitution ==
The Cadore was constituted on 1 December 1953 in the city of Belluno. The brigade's name alludes to the Cadore Alps in the northernmost part of the province of Belluno. Most of the brigade's recruits came from the north-eastern Veneto Region. The brigade was tasked with defending the Piave valley against an attack by forces of the Warsaw Pact. The brigade's strength was around 3,600 men and initially it was composed of the:

- Alpine Brigade "Cadore", in Belluno
  - Brigade Headquarters, in Belluno
  - 7th Alpini Regiment, in Belluno
    - Command Company, in Belluno
    - Alpini Battalion "Pieve di Cadore", in Pieve di Cadore
    - Alpini Battalion "Belluno", in Belluno and Agordo
    - 7th Mortar Company, in Belluno
  - 6th Mountain Artillery Regiment, in Belluno
    - Command Battery, in Belluno
    - Mountain Artillery Group "Lanzo", in Belluno
    - Mountain Artillery Group "Pieve di Cadore", in Bassano
    - Mountain Artillery Group "Agordo", in Feltre
    - Anti-aircraft Artillery Group, in Belluno (disbanded in 1957)
  - Engineer Company "Cadore", in Belluno
  - Signal Company "Cadore", in Belluno

In the following years the brigade was augmented with further units:

- Alpini Battalion "Feltre", in Feltre and Strigno (transferred from the Alpine Brigade "Julia" on 1 June 1956)
- Alpini Paratroopers Platoon, in Belluno (formed in 1956)
- XIX Alpini Fortification Battalion, in Santo Stefano di Cadore (constituted on 1 January 1957; renamed Alpini Battalion "Val Cismon" on 1 July 1963)
- Services Grouping "Cadore" (formed from the brigade's supply, maintenance, and logistic units in 1957)
- Light Aircraft Section "Cadore", in Belluno (formed in 1957 and expanded to Light Aircraft Unit "Cadore" in 1966)

The Alpini Paratroopers Platoon merged with the paratrooper platoons of the other four alpine brigades on 1 April 1964 to form the Alpini Paratroopers Company in Bolzano under direct command of the 4th Army Corps. The same year the 7th Mortar Company was disbanded and its mortars and troops divided among the brigade's three Alpini battalions.

== 1975 Reorganization ==
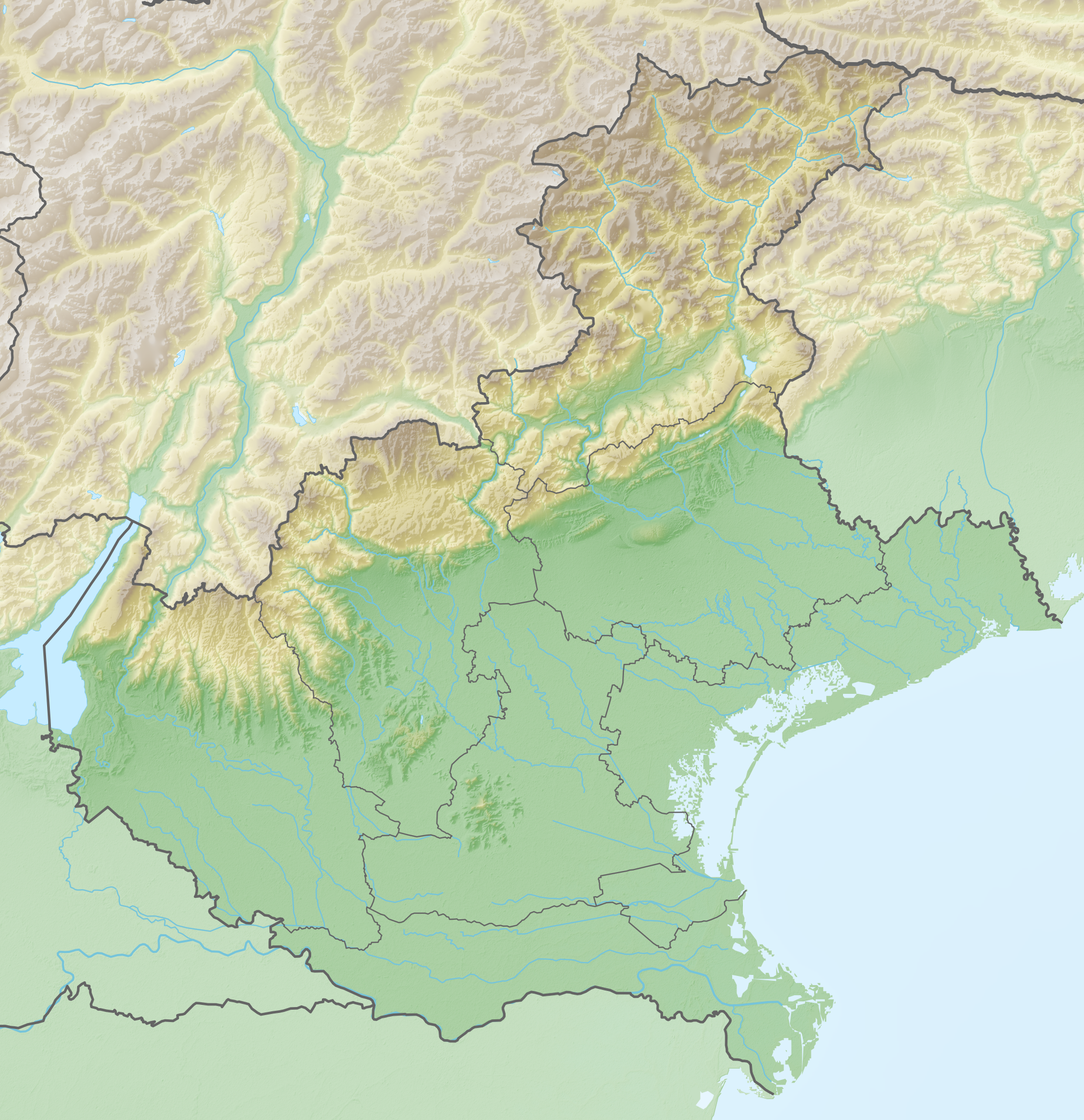
Cadore locations 1989

With the 1975 Italian Army reform the regimental level was abolished and battalions came under direct command of multi-arms brigades. At the same time the army reduced and realigned its forces and therefore the Cadore saw some changes to its composition: the 7th Alpini Regiment, 6th Mountain Artillery Regiment, and Mountain Artillery Group "Pieve di Cadore" were disbanded, while the brigade headquarters and the signal company were merged to form the Command and Signal Unit "Cadore". Additionally an anti-tank company was raised, the Light Aircraft Unit "Cadore" was transferred to the newly formed 4th Army Light Aviation Regiment "Altair" of the 4th Army Corps, the Services Grouping "Cadore" was reorganized as a logistic battalion, the Alpini Battalion "Belluno" became a training unit, and the Alpini Battalion "Val Cismon" was reduced to 264th Alpini Company "Val Cismon".

After the reform the brigade's two Alpini battalions had an authorized strength of 950 men, while the two artillery groups had an authorized strength of 610 men and fielded 18 M56 105 mm pack howitzers each. The new composition was:

- Alpine Brigade "Cadore", in Belluno
  - Command and Signal Unit "Cadore", in Belluno
  - Alpini Battalion "Feltre", in Feltre
    - Headquarters and Service Company
    - 64th Alpini Company
    - 65th Alpini Company
    - 66th Alpini Company
    - 125th Heavy Mortar Company
  - Alpini Battalion "Pieve di Cadore", in Tai di Cadore
    - Headquarters and Service Company
    - 67th Alpini Company
    - 68th Alpini Company
    - 75th Alpini Company in Santo Stefano di Cadore
    - 167th Heavy Mortar Company
  - Alpini (Recruits Training) Battalion "Belluno", in Belluno
    - Headquarters and Service Company
    - 92nd Alpini (Training) Company
    - 127th Alpini (Training) Company
    - 141st Alpini (Training) Company
    - 142nd Alpini (Training) Company
  - Mountain Artillery Group "Lanzo", in Belluno
    - Headquarters and Service Battery
    - 16th Mountain Artillery Battery
    - 44th Mountain Artillery Battery
    - 47th Mountain Artillery Battery
  - Mountain Artillery Group "Agordo", in Bassano del Grappa
    - Headquarters and Service Battery
    - 41st Mountain Artillery Battery
    - 42nd Mountain Artillery Battery
    - 43rd Mountain Artillery Battery
  - Logistic Battalion "Cadore", in Belluno
    - Command and Services Platoon
    - 1st Light Logistic Unit
    - 2nd Light Logistic Unit
    - Medium Logistic Unit
  - 264th Alpini Company "Val Cismon", in Santo Stefano di Cadore (transferred on 1 November 1976 to the Alpini Battalion "Val Brenta" of the Alpine Brigade "Tridentina")
  - Anti-tank Company "Cadore", in Belluno
  - Engineer Company "Cadore", in Belluno

=== Strategic plans in case of war ===
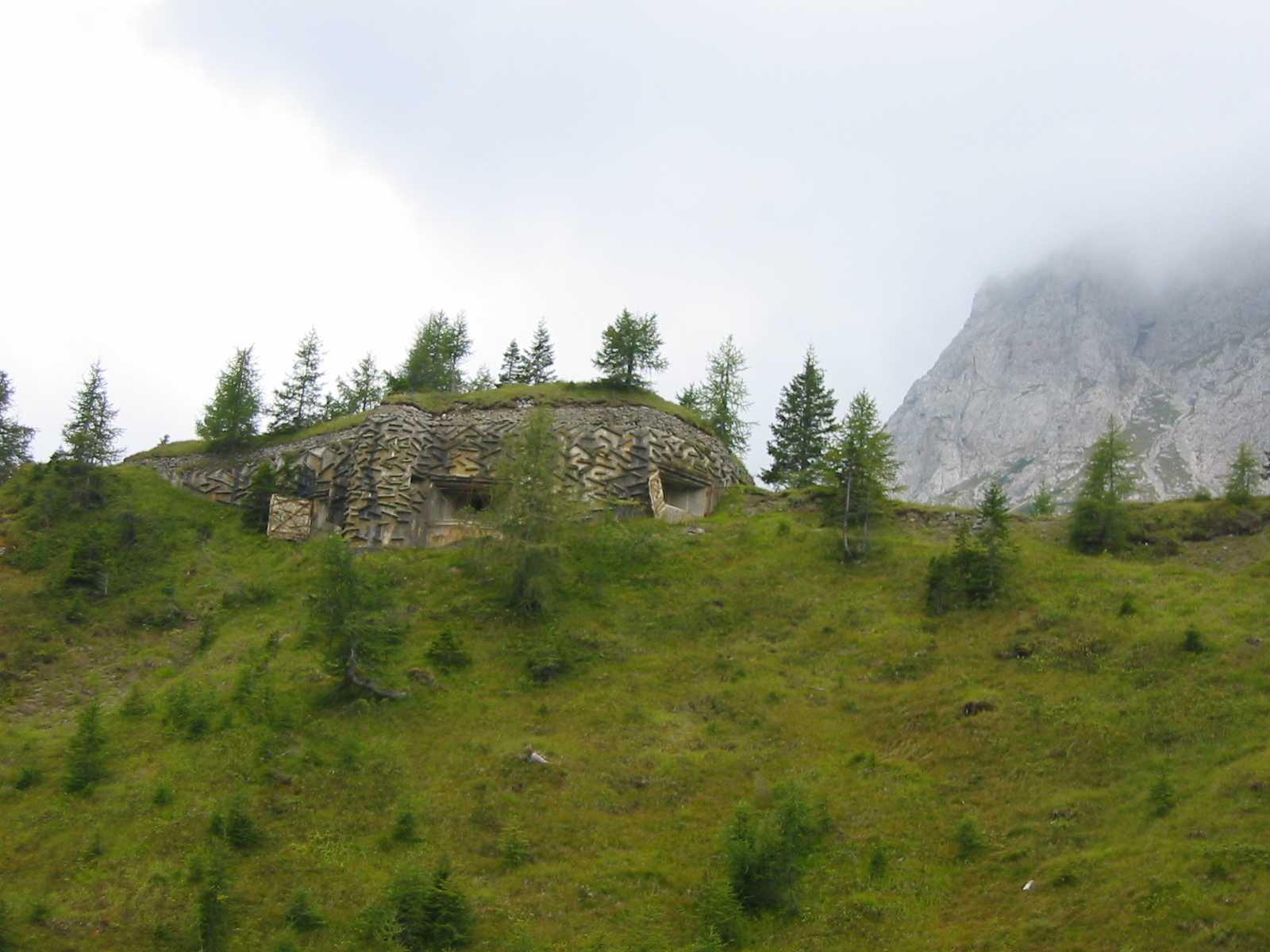
Alpine wall bunker on the Kreuzbergpass

After the 1975 reform the 4th Alpine Army Corps was responsible to defend the Italian border along the main chain of the alps from the Swiss-Austrian-Italian border tripoint in the west to the Italian-Yugoslavian border in the east. In case of war with Yugoslavia the 4th Alpine Army Corps would remain static in its position guarding the left flank of the 5th Army Corps, which would meet the enemy forces in the plains of Friuli-Venezia Giulia. The only brigade which would have seen combat in such a case would have been the Julia.

In case of a war with the Warsaw Pact the 4th Alpine Army Corps had two war planes: one in the case the Soviet Southern Group of Forces and Hungarian Army would march through Yugoslavia and the other in case the Warsaw Pact would violate the Austrian neutrality and march through Austria. In case the enemy forces would come through Yugoslavia, the Julia would cover the mountainous left flank of the 5th Army Corps, which with its four armoured and five mechanized brigades would try to wear down the enemy before it could break out into the North Italian Padan plain. The other alpine brigades would remain static.

In the more likely case the Soviet and Hungarian divisions would invade Austria and march through Southern Styria and through the Drava Valley in Carinthia the alpine brigades would have been the first front line units of the Italian Army. The Julia would have defended the Canal Valley and the Tridentina the Puster Valley, while the Orobica had a special mission and the Taurinense would remain in reserve. The Cadore was stationed between the Julia and the Tridentina brigades and tasked with defending the Piave Valley. If the Soviet forces would have advanced along the Drava Valley they would have reached the Italian border at Winnebach in the Puster Valley which was defended by the Alpini Battalion "Bassano" of the Tridentina. The Tridentina was tasked to defend the Puster Valley, however if Soviet forces would turn south after crossing the border they would have been able to reach the Piave Valley through the Sexten Valley and over the Kreuzbergpass or through the Höhlensteintal and over the Cimabanche Pass. Therefore, the Cadore's Alpini Battalion "Pieve di Cadore" based in Tai di Cadore was tasked with holding the Kreuzbergpass and Cimabanche pass. The "Pieve di Cadore" was supported by the Mountain Artillery Group "Lanzo" based in Belluno. The second battalion of the brigade, the Alpini Battalion "Feltre" based in Feltre along with the Mountain Artillery Group "Agordo" based in Bassano del Grappa was tasked to cover the many Dolomite mountain passes on the left flank of the "Pieve di Cadore" battalion.

To aid in the defence of the narrow mountain valleys the 4th Army Corps re-activated some fortifications of the World War II era Alpine Wall. In the area of operation of the Cadore the 264th Alpini Company "Val Cismon" based in Santo Stefano di Cadore was tasked with maintaining the Alpine Wall fortifications on the Kreuzbergpass, in the Höhlensteintal and near Prags. In wartime the fortifications would have been manned as follows:

- Kreuzbergpass: 7 bunker, 247 men from the 264th Company (Italian Wikipedia: Sbarramento Passo Monte Croce Comelico)
- Val Frison: 3 bunker, ? men from the 265th (Reserve) Company (Italian Wikipedia: Sbarramento Val Frison)
- Landro Nord: 3 bunker, 150 men from the 277th (Reserve) Company (Italian Wikipedia: Sbarramento della Val di Landro)
- Prags: 2 bunkers, 116 men from the 347th (Reserve) Company (Italian Wikipedia: Sbarramento di Braies)

Administratively the 264th Alpini Company "Val Cismon" fell under the Alpini Battalion "Val Brenta" of the Tridentina brigade. On 23 August 1986 the company was disbanded and the bunkers stripped of their equipment.

== 1991 Reorganization ==
In 1991 the Mountain Artillery Group "Agordo" was disbanded and the remaining battalions took the names of historical Alpini regiments to carry on their traditions. Each regiment consisted of one of the brigade's Alpini battalions and an additional support company. Furthermore, the brigade's Anti-tank Company was disbanded and the Command and Signal Unit merged with the Engineer Company to form the Command and Tactical Supports Unit "Cadore". The new composition was:

- Alpine Brigade "Cadore", in Belluno
  - Command and Tactical Supports Unit "Cadore", in Belluno
  - 7th Alpini Regiment Alpini Battalion "Feltre", in Feltre
  - 12th Alpini Regiment Alpini Battalion "Pieve di Cadore", in Pieve di Cadore (disbanded in 1997)
  - 16th Regiment "Belluno" Alpini (Recruits Training) Battalion "Belluno", in Belluno
  - 6th Mountain Artillery Regiment Mountain Artillery Group "Lanzo", in Bassano del Grappa (disbanded on July 15, 1995)
  - Logistic Battalion "Cadore", in Belluno

== Today ==
The brigade was disbanded on 31 January 1997 and the remaining units (7th Alpini Regiment and 16th Regiment "Belluno") passed to the Alpine Brigade "Julia".
