= Valleys of South Tyrol =

Valleys of a mountainous province

This is a partial list of valleys of South Tyrol, a mountainous province in northern Italy, bordering Austria and Switzerland. Most valleys have two names, a German and an Italian one. Those in the Ladin-speaking areas have three names.

Valleys of South Tyrol

German	Italian	Ladin
Ahrntal	Valle Aurina
Durnholzer Tal	Valdurna
Eggental	Val d'Ega
Eisacktal	Valle Isarco
Etschtal	Val d'Adige
Fischleintal	Val Fiscalina
Gadertal	Valle Badia	Val Badia
Gröden	Val Gardena	Gherdëina
Gsies	Valle di Casies
Höhlensteintal	Val di Landro
Langtaufers	Valle Lunga
Martell	Val Martello
Matscher Tal	Val di Mazia
Passeier	Val Passiria
Pfitsch	Val di Vizze
Pustertal	Val Pusteria
Ridnaun	Ridanna
Sarntal	Val Sarentino
Sextental	Valle di Sesto
Schnals	Senales
Suldental	Val di Solda
Tierser Tal	Val di Tires
Ulten	Val Ultimo
Vinschgau	Val Venosta
Wipptal
