= Division "Tridentina" =

- Divisione "Tridentina"
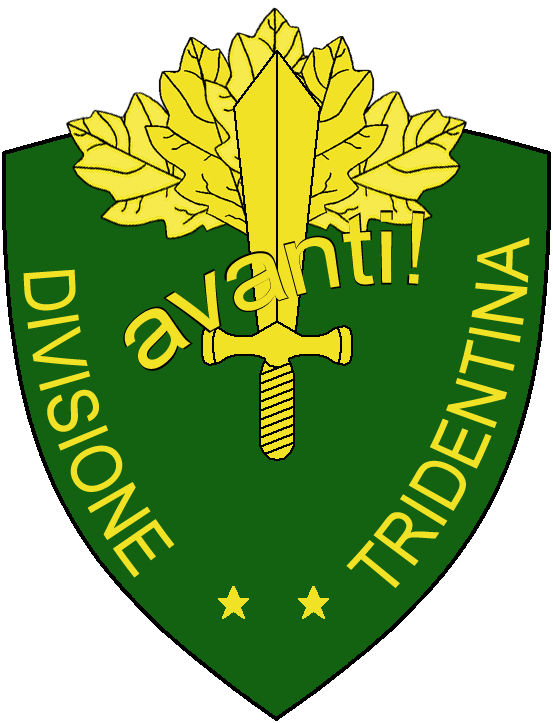
- Coat of Arms of the Division "Tridentina"
- Active: 1 January 2003 - today
- Country: Italy
- Branch: Italian Army
- Type: Alpini
- Part of: Alpine Troops Command
- Garrison/HQ: Bolzano
- Motto(s): Avanti! (Forward)

The Division "Tridentina" Italian: Divisione "Tridentina" is one of three active divisions of the Italian Army. The division is based in Bolzano in the province of South Tyrol and part of the Alpine Troops Command in the same city. The division carries on the name and traditions of the World War II Royal Italian Army 2nd Alpine Division "Tridentina" and the Cold War Italian Army Alpine Brigade "Tridentina".

== History ==
In 2002 the Italian Army decided to raise three division commands, with one of the three always readily deployable for NATO missions. The army decided that each of the three should carry on the traditions of one of the divisions that served with distinction in World War II. Therefore, on 1 January 2003 the Division Command "Tridentina" was activated in Bolzano with officers and staff of the Alpine Brigade "Tridentina", which had been disbanded the preceding day.

Initially the division was assigned only a Command and Tactical Supports Unit with further units to be assigned only in case of war. In 2013 the Italian army decided to abolish the corps-level and assign the army's brigades to the three divisions: Tridentina, Acqui, and Friuli. Therefore, during October 2016 the Tridentina took command of the army's two alpine brigades. As of 2019 the plans to disband the corps-level are on hold and the Division "Tridentina" has been merged into Alpine Troops Command as a reserve division command. Both alpine brigades returned to be commanded by the Alpine Troops Command.

== Structure ==
- Division "Tridentina", in Bolzano (South Tyrol)
  - Command and Tactical Supports Unit "Tridentina", in Bolzano (South Tyrol)
    - Command Company
    - Services Company
    - Signal Company
