= Antholzer Tal =

Valley in Italy

Coordinates: 46.846808°N 12.094746°E

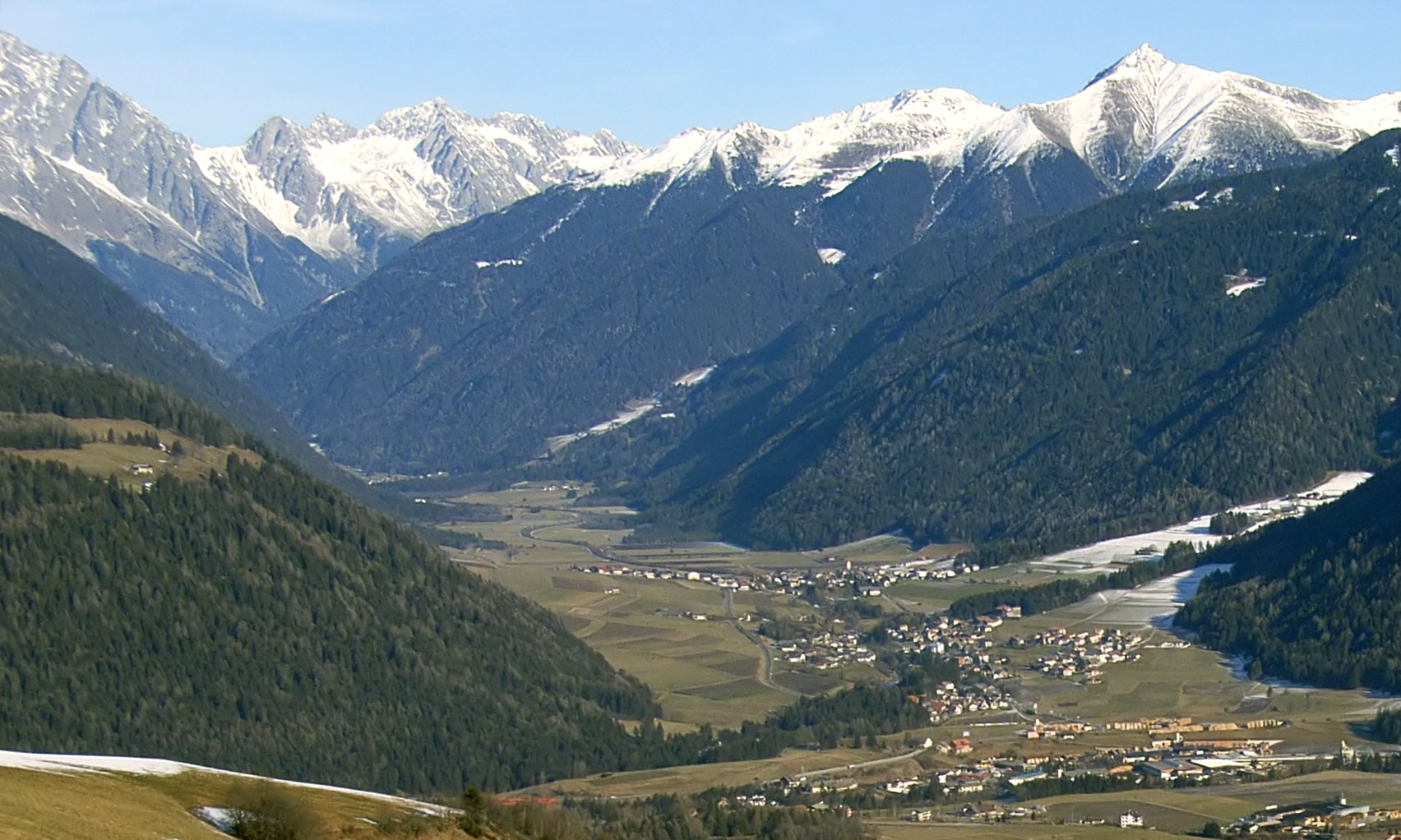
View from Kronplatz to the valley, in the foreground the villages of Niederrasen und Oberrasen

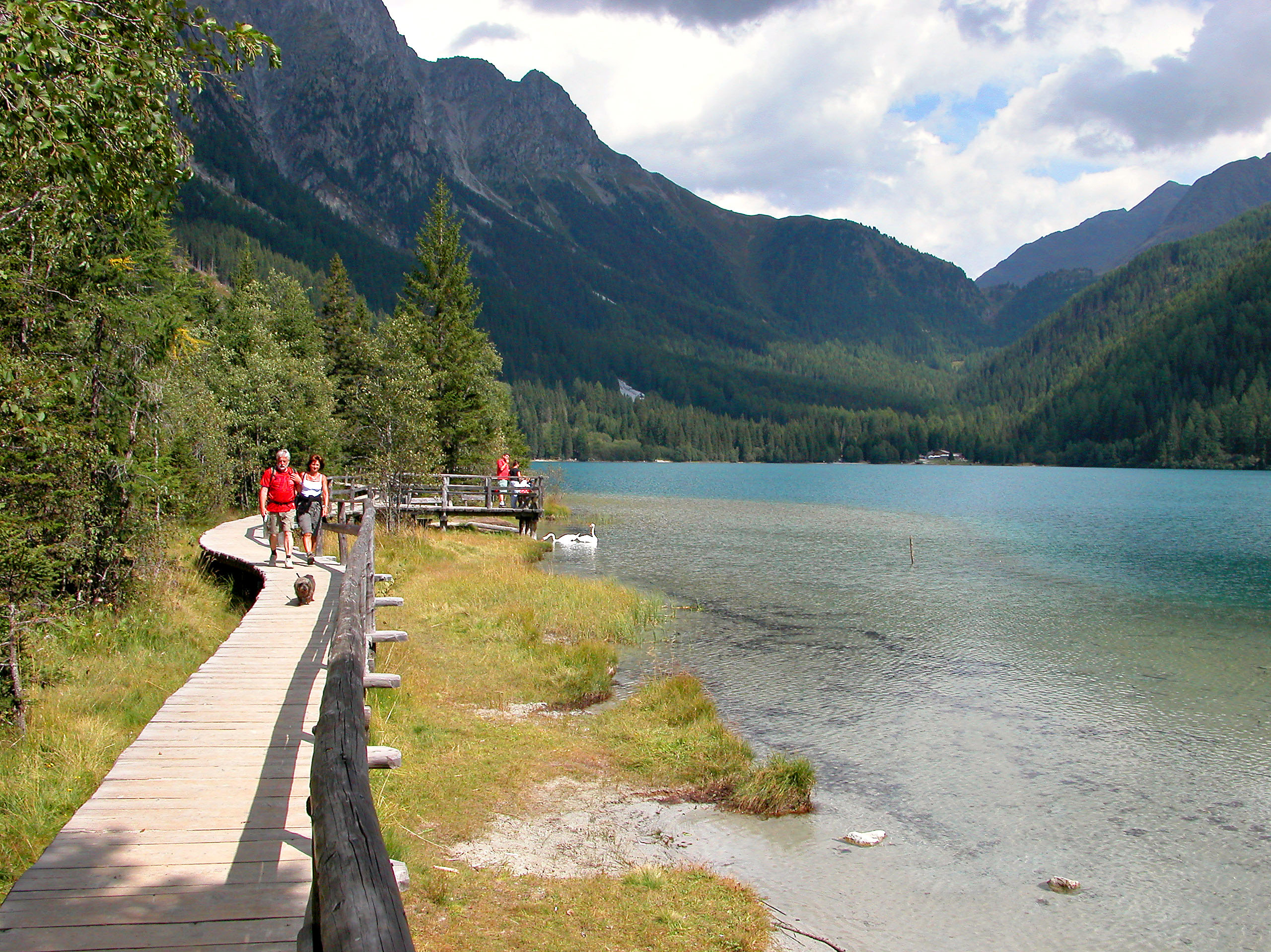
Part of the Antholzer valley with Lake Antholzer See

Antholzer Tal (Italian: valle di Anterselva) is a side valley of the Upper Puster Valley in Rasen-Antholz municipality, South Tyrol, Italy.

It is part of Rieserferner-Ahrn Nature Park and named after the village of Antholz, hence the valley is also known as Antholz valley.

== Settlements ==
Several villages are situated here, the lowest being Niederrasen at the entrance, followed towards the end are Oberrasen, Antholz Niedertal, Antholz Mittertal, and Antholz Obertal.

== See also ==
- Antholzer See
- Valleys of South Tyrol

== Sources ==
- Abteilung Forstwirtschaft der Autonomen Provinz Bozen – Südtirol (publ.): Waldtypisierung Südtirol. Band 2: Waldgruppen, Naturräume, p. 268, Bozen 2010
