= Alpini Battalion "Val Chiese" =

Inactive Italian Army mountain infantry unit

- Battaglione Alpini "Val Chiese"
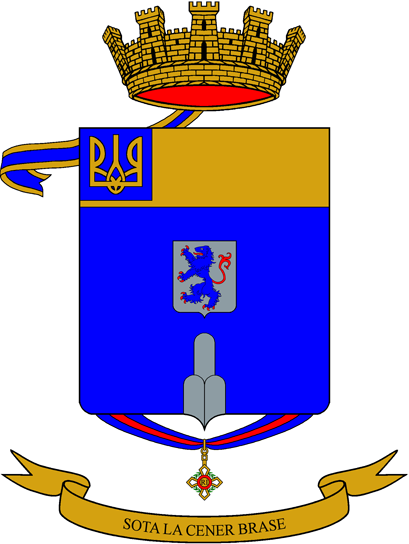
- Battalion coat of arms
- Active: 15 Feb. 1915 – 1919; 2 Sept. 1939 – 31 Oct. 1940; 2 Jan. 1941 – 10 Sept. 1943; 1 July 1963 – 30 June 1979
- Country: Italy
- Branch: Italian Army
- Type: Mountain Infantry
- Part of: Alpine Brigade "Orobica"
- Garrison/HQ: Sterzing
- Motto: "Sota la cener brase"
- Anniversaries: 26 January 1943
- Decorations: 1× Military Order of Italy; 1× Gold Medal of Military Valor

Insignia
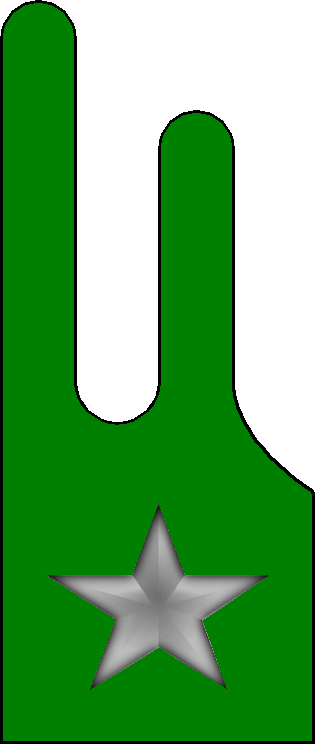
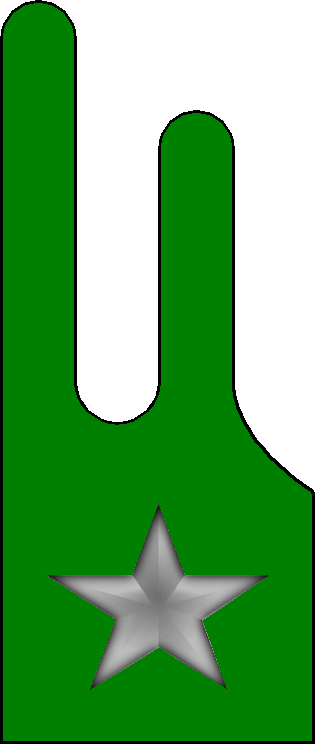
- Alpini gorget patches

The Alpini Battalion "Val Chiese" (Italian: Battaglione Alpini "Val Chiese") is an inactive mountain warfare battalion of the Italian Army based last in Sterzing in South Tyrol. The battalion belongs to the Italian Army's Alpini infantry speciality and was assigned to the Alpine Brigade "Orobica". In 1915, the Royal Italian Army's 5th Alpini Regiment formed the Alpini Battalion "Val Chiese", which fought in World War I in the alpine areas of the Italian front. The battalion was disbanded in 1919.

In September 1939, the "Val Chiese" battalion was reformed and in June 1940 the battalion participated in the Italian invasion of France. At the end of October 1940 the battalion was disbanded. The battalion was reformed again in January 1941 and sent to Albania to reinforce the 6th Alpini Regiment, which was suffering heavy casualties in the Greco-Italian War. In summer 1942, the "Val Chiese" battalion deployed with the 6th Alpini Regiment to the Eastern Front, where the regiment and "Val Chiese" battalion were almost completely destroyed during the Red Army's Operation Little Saturn in winter 1942–43. On 8 September 1943, the Armistice of Cassibile was announced and two days later, on 10 September 1943, invading German forces disbanded the 6th Alpini Regiment and its battalions.

In 1963, the battalion was reformed and tasked with manning the Alpine Wall fortifications that blocked passage over the Brenner Pass and Reschen Pass, as well as through the Passeier Valley and the Eisack Valley. In 1979, the battalion was disbanded and its 253rd Alpini Fortification Company joined the Alpini Fortification Battalion "Val Brenta". The battalion's anniversary falls on 26 January 1943, the day of the Battle of Nikolayevka, during which the 5th Alpini Regiment and 6th Alpini Regiment broke through Soviet lines and opened an escape route for the retreating troops of the Alpine Army Corps.

== History ==
=== World War I ===
At the outbreak of World War I Italy declared its neutrality. In January 1915, the existing Alpini battalions began with the formation of a reserve battalion, with men, who had completed their military service at least four years, but not more than eleven years prior. These reserve battalions were named for a valley (Italian: Valle; abbreviated Val) located near their associated regular Alpini battalion's base, and the reserve battalions wore the same Nappina on their Cappello Alpino as their associated regular Alpini battalion. On 15 February 1915, the 5th Alpini Regiment's Alpini Battalion "Vestone" formed the Alpini Battalion "Val Chiese", which initially consisted of the 253rd and 254th Alpini Company. On 8 July 1915, the 255th Alpini Company joined the battalion.

On 23 May 1915, Italy declared war on Austro-Hungary and the Alpini Battalion "Val Chiese" occupied position in the Val di Ledro. As the mountainous terrain of the Italian front made the deployment of entire Alpini regiments impracticable the Alpini battalions were employed either independently or assigned to groups, groupings, or infantry divisions as needed. The battalion remained in the Val di Ledro until July 1918 and then was deployed in the Val Giudicarie.

=== Interwar years ===
After the conclusion of World War I the "Val Chiese" battalion was disbanded in 1919. On 12 February 1921, the 5th Alpini Regiment transferred the Alpini Battalion "Vestone" to the 6th Alpini Regiment, which in 1935 joined the 2nd Alpine Division "Tridentina".

=== World War II ===
On 2 September 1939, one day after the German Invasion of Poland had begun, the 6th Alpini Regiment reformed the Alpini battalions "Val d'Adige" and "Val Chiese". The two battalions were assigned to the 5th Alpini Group, with which they participated in June 1940 in the Italian invasion of France. On 31 October 1940, the two battalions were disbanded.

==== Greco-Italian War ====
In November 1940, the 2nd Alpine Division "Tridentina" was transferred to Albania to shore up the crumbling Italian front during the Greco-Italian War. On 18 November 1940, the 6th Alpini Regiment entered the front in the upper Devoll valley. In December 1940, the regiment suffered heavy losses in the Greek counter-offensive. On 2 January 1941, the Alpini Battalion "Val Chiese" was reformed and sent immediately to Albania, where the battalion was assigned as third battalion to the 6th Alpini Regiment. By now the "Tridentina" division had retreated into Albania, where it continued to fight until the German invasion of Greece in April 1941. The "Tridentina" division then pursued the retreating Greek forces to Leskovik and Ersekë. After the war's conclusion the division returned to Italy.

On 15 February 1942, the 6th Alpini Regiment formed a support weapons company for each of its three battalions and the Alpini Battalion "Tirano" received the 112th Support Weapons Company. These companies were equipped with Breda M37 machine guns, and 45mm Mod. 35 and 81mm Mod. 35 mortars.

==== Eastern Front ====
On 2 March 1942, the 2nd Alpine Division "Tridentina" was assigned, together with the 3rd Alpine Division "Julia" and 4th Alpine Division "Cuneense", to the Alpine Army Corps. The corps was assigned to the Italian 8th Army, which was readied to be deployed in summer 1942 to the Eastern Front.

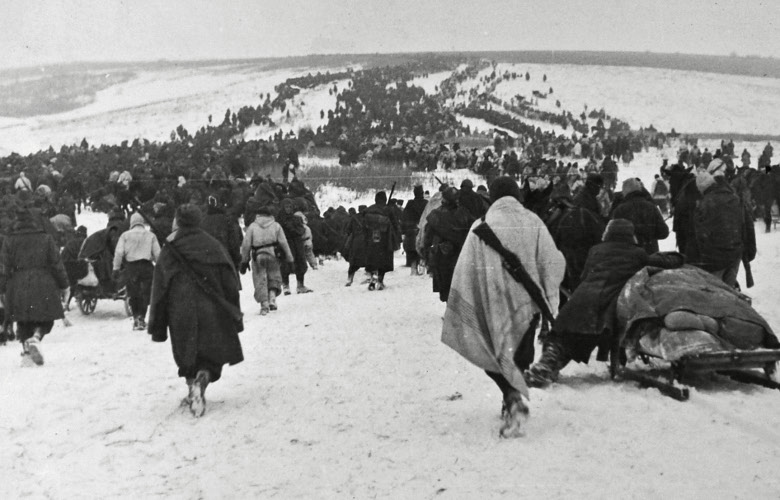
The Alpine Army Corps' retreat in Ukraine in January 1943

In July 1942 the three alpine division arrived in Eastern Ukraine, from where they marched eastwards towards the Don river. The Italian 8th Army covered the left flank of the German 6th Army, which spearheaded the German summer offensive of 1942 towards Stalingrad. On 12 December 1942, the Red Army commenced Operation Little Saturn, which, in its first stage, attacked and encircled the Italian II Army Corps and XXXV Army Corps, to the southeast of the Alpine Army Corps. On 13 January 1943, the Red Army launched the second stage of Operation Little Saturn with the Voronezh Front encircling and destroying the Hungarian Second Army to the northwest of the Alpine Army Corps.

On the evening of 17 January 1943, the Alpine Army Corps commander, General Gabriele Nasci, ordered a full retreat. At this point only the 2nd Alpine Division "Tridentina" was still capable of conducting combat operations. The 40,000-strong mass of stragglers — Alpini and Italians from other commands, plus German and Hungarians — followed the "Tridentina", which led the way westwards to the new Axis lines. As the Soviets had already occupied every village, bitter battles had to be fought to clear the way. On the morning of 26 January 1943, the spearheads of the "Tridentina' reached the hamlet of Nikolayevka, occupied by the Soviet 48th Guards Rifle Division. The Soviets had fortified the railway embankment on both sides of the village. General Nasci ordered a frontal assault and at 9:30 am the Battle of Nikolayevka began with the 6th Alpini Regiment leading the first attack. By noon the Italian forces had reached the outskirts of the village and the Alpine Army Corps' Chief of Staff General Giulio Martinat led the 5th Alpini Regiment forward for another assault, durich which General Martinat fell. By sunset the Alpini battalions were still struggling to break the Soviet lines and in a last effort to decide the battle before nightfall General Luigi Reverberi, the commanding General of the "Tridentina" division, ordered a human wave attack on the Soviet lines. The attack managed to break through the Soviet lines and the Italians continued their retreat, which was no longer contested by Soviet forces. On 1 February 1943 the remnants of the Alpine Army Corps reached Axis lines.

On 11 February 1943, the survivors were counted and 1,646 men of the 6th Alpini Regiment had were listed as killed or missing. For its bravery and sacrifice in the Soviet Union the 6th Alpini Regiment was awarded a Gold Medal of Military Valor, which was affixed to the regiment's flag and added to the regiment's coat of arms.

The 6th Alpini Regiment was still in the process of being rebuilt, when the Armistice of Cassibile was announced on 8 September 1943. Two days later, on 10 September 1943, the regiment was disbanded by invading German forces.

=== Cold War ===
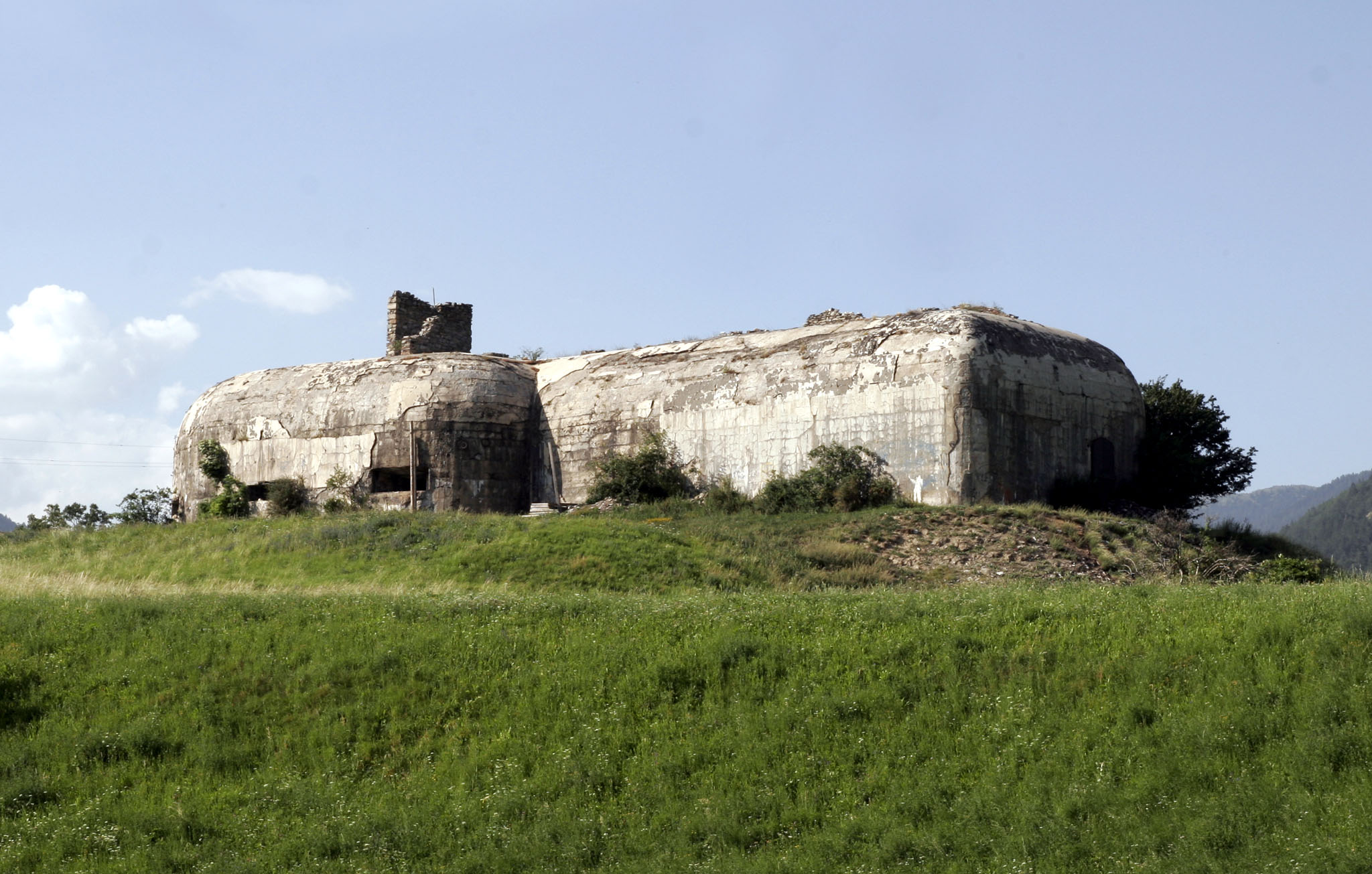
Alpine wall bunker in Mals

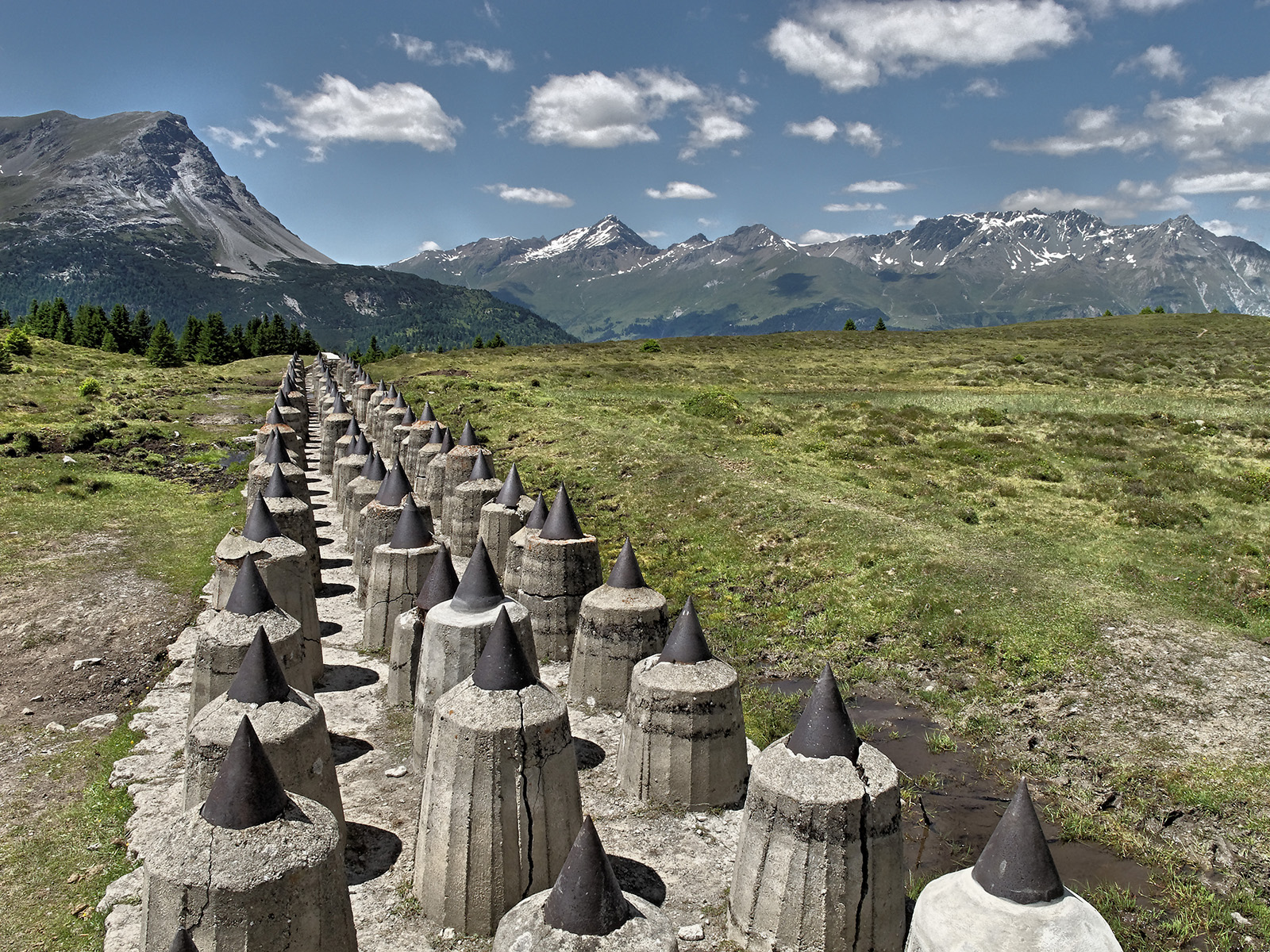
The Anti-tank obstacle at Plamort above Reschen

On 15 December 1952, the Italian Army formed the 22nd Frontier Grouping in Meran. The grouping consisted of the I and II barrier groups, which manned the fortifications and bunkers of the Alpine Wall in the upper Vinschgau Valley and upper Eisack Valley. On 1 September 1953, the grouping joined the Alpine Brigade "Orobica". On 1 January 1957, the 22nd Frontier Grouping was renamed 22nd Alpini Position Grouping and the following 7 April the grouping received its flag. During the same year the grouping moved from Meran to Sterzing.

On 1 September 1958, the grouping's two barrier groups were renumbered as XXIX and XXX Alpini position battalions. The XXIX Alpini Position Battalion was based in Sterzing and tasked with maintaining and, in case of war, manning the Alpine wall positions on the Brenner Pass, as well as the positions at Gossensaß and Franzensfeste, which blocked the passage through the Eisack Valley, and the position at Pfitsch, which blocked passage through the upper Pfitsch Valley. The XXX Alpini Position Battalion was based in Mals and tasked with maintaining and, in case of war, manning the Alpine wall position on the Reschen Pass, and the position in Saltaus, which blocked passage through the Passeier Valley.

On 31 December 1962, the 22nd Alpini Position Grouping was disbanded and the XXX Alpini Position Battalion reduced to reserve unit. The two companies of the XXX Alpini Position Battalion were transferred to the XXIX Alpini Position Battalion. On the same day the flag of the 22nd Alpini Position Grouping was transferred to the XXIX Alpini Position Battalion for safekeeping. On 1 July 1963, the XXIX Alpini Position Battalion was renamed Alpini Battalion "Val Chiese", while the XXX Alpini Position Battalion was renamed Alpini Battalion "Val Camonica". The "Val Chiese" battalion consisted now of a command, a command platoon, three active companies (251st, 253rd, and 254th), and three reserve companies (250th, 255th, and 364th).

On 1 November 1970, the Alpini Battalion "Val Chiese" was renamed Alpini Fortification Battalion "Val Chiese". During the 1975 army reform the army disbanded the regimental level and newly independent battalions were granted for the first time their own flags. On 12 November 1976, the President of the Italian Republic Giovanni Leone assigned with decree 846 the flag and traditions of the 22nd Alpini Position Grouping to the Alpini Fortification Battalion "Val Chiese". At the same time the medals and military honors awarded to the "Val Chiese" battalion were transferred from the flag of the 6th Alpini Regiment to the battalion's flag, while the medals and military honors awarded to the entire regiment were duplicated for the flag of the battalion. Consequently, the "Val Chiese" battalion's flag was decorated with one Military Order of Italy and one Gold Medal of Military Valor. The two awards were also added to the battalion's newly created coat of arms. The Alpini Fortification Battalion "Val Brenta" consisted now of the following active units:

- Alpini Fortification Battalion "Val Chiese", in Sterzing
  - Command and Services Company, in Sterzing
  - 253rd Alpini Fortification Company, in Sterzing
  - 254th Maintenance and Surveillance Company, in Gossensaß

On 30 June 1979, the Alpini Fortification Battalion "Val Chiese" was disbanded and the flag of the 22nd Alpini Position Grouping was transferred to the Shrine of the Flags in the Vittoriano in Rome. The next day, 1 July 1979, the battalion's 253rd Alpini Fortification Company was renamed 253rd Alpini Fortification Company "Val Chiese" and joined the Alpini Fortification Battalion "Val Brenta". On 1 August 1986, the Alpini Fortification Battalion "Val Brenta" became a reserve unit and the 253rd Alpini Fortification Company "Val Chiese" was disbanded.

== Fortifications ==
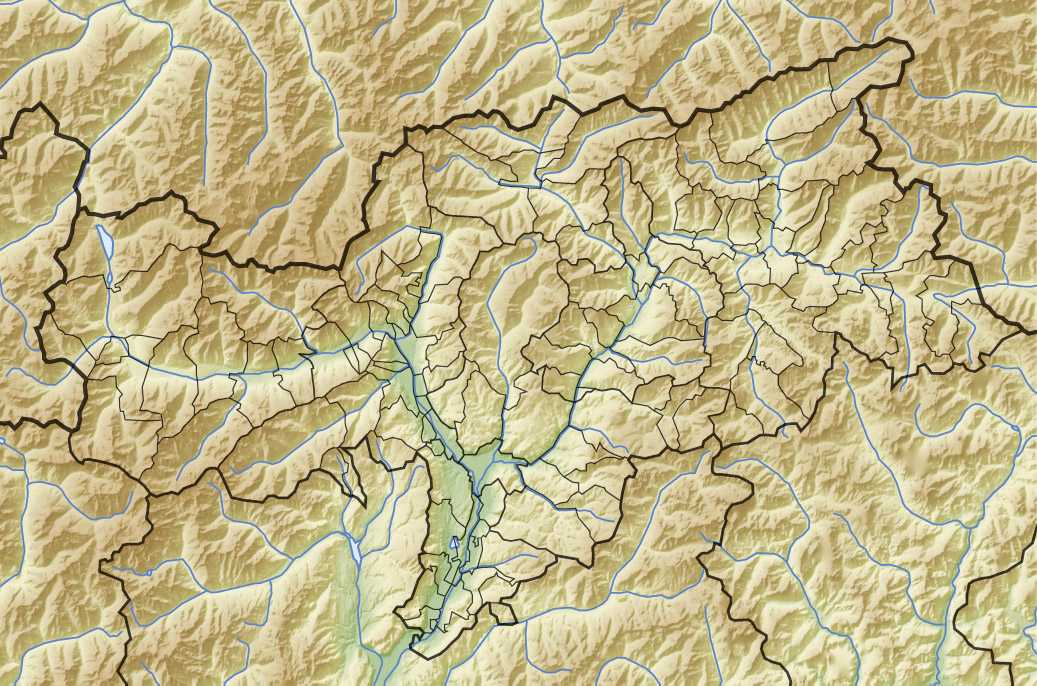
"Val Chiese" (in blue) and "Val Camonica" (in green) fortifications

After 31 December 1962, the Alpini Fortification Battalion "Val Chiese" was responsible for all Alpine Wall fortifications and barriers in the Vinschgau Valley, Passeier Valley, and Eisack Valley. The fortifications were divided into three readiness categories designated Type A, Type B, and Type C:

- Type A = fortification fully equipped and provisioned, with its personnel and close support platoon onsite (On 1 June 1975, the Type A fortifications in the sector of the "Val Chiese" battalion were re-categorized as Type B)
- Type B = fortification fully equipped and provisioned, with its personnel onsite, while the close support platoon was a reserve unit
- Type C = fortification fully equipped, but not provisioned, with its personnel and close support platoon both being reserve units

The following lists all the barriers grouped by their original Alpini battalions, followed by the link to the Italian wikipedia's article about the barrier in brackets:

- Alpini Battalion "Val Chiese", in Sterzing
  - Barrier Brenner: 5 bunker, 136 men, Type A — 253rd Alpini Company (Sbarramento Brennero)
  - Barrier Gossensaß: 7 bunker 190 men, Type A — 254th Alpini Company (Sbarramento Tenne-Novale)
  - Barrier Pfitsch: 3 bunker, 121 men, Type C — 255th Alpini Company (Sbarramento Saletto)
  - Barrier Franzensfeste: 5 bunker, 165 men, Type C — 364th Alpini Company (Sbarramento Fortezza)
- Alpini Battalion "Val Camonica", in Mals
  - Barrier Saltaus: 4 bunker, 169 men, Type C — 250th Alpini Company (Sbarramento Saltusio)
  - Barrier Reschen pass: 9 bunker, 254 men, Type A — 251st Alpini Company (re-categorized as Type C in 1975; Sbarramento Passo Resia)
  - Barrier Mals-Glurns: 9 bunker, no troops assigned after 1964 (before 1964 the 252nd Alpini Company) (Sbarramento Malles-Glorenza)
