= Sextental =

Valley in South Tyrol, Italy

Coordinates: 46°40′22″N 12°22′35″E

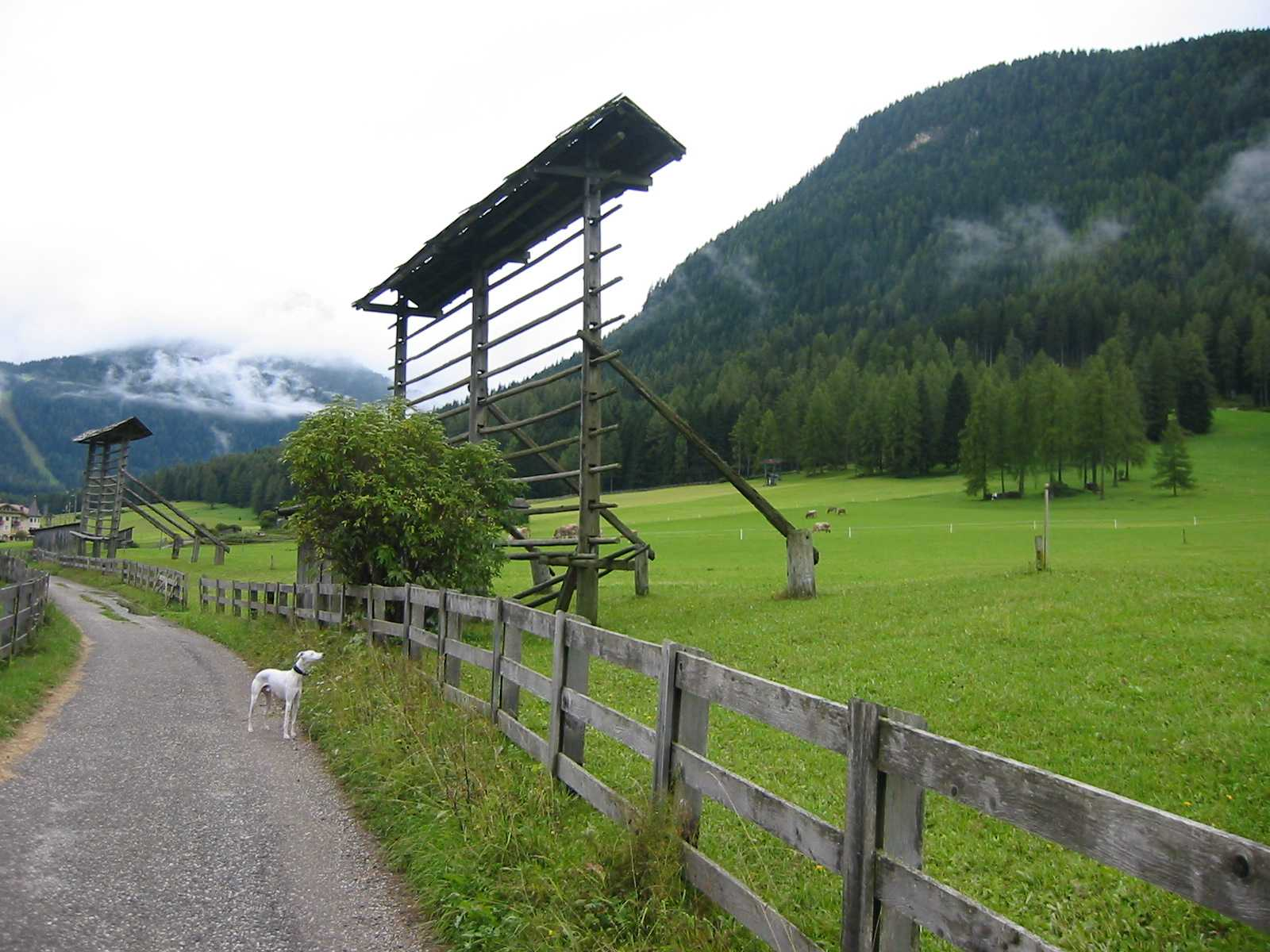
Sextental

The Sextental (Italian: Val di Sesto) is a side valley of the Puster Valley in South Tyrol, Italy and is congruent with the municipality of Sexten. The Kreuzbergpass connects it with the Comelico valley to the southeast.
