= Santo Stefano di Cadore =

- Comune
- Comune di Santo Stefano di Cadore
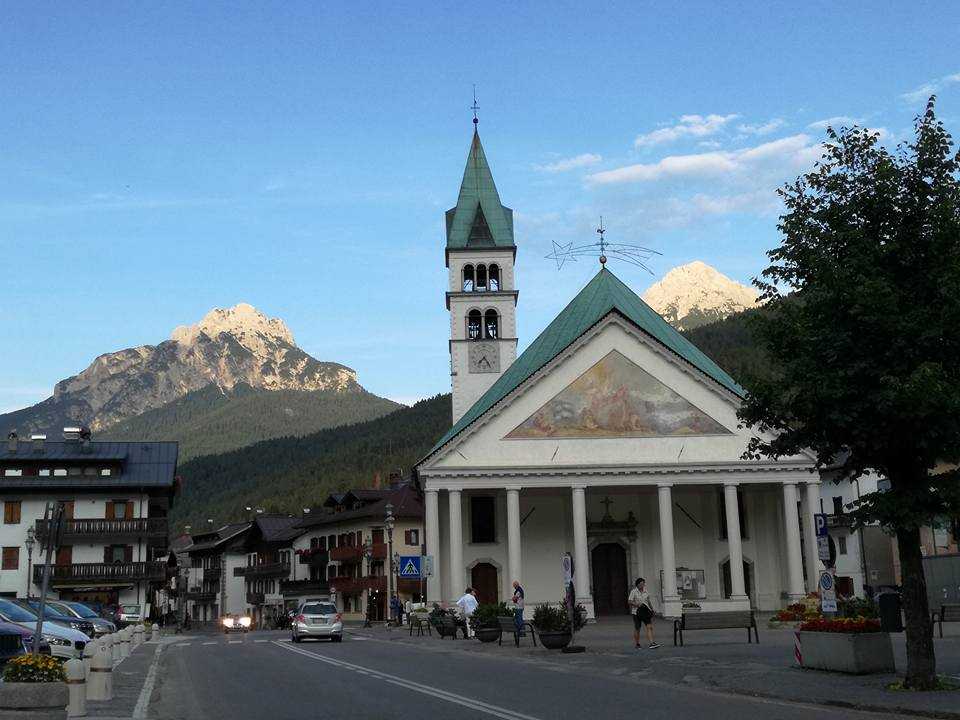

- Coat of arms

- Location within Italy Location within Veneto
- Coordinates: 46°34′N 12°33′E
- Country: Italy
- Region: Veneto
- Province: Belluno (BL)
- Frazioni: Campolongo, Casada, Costalissoio

Government
  - Mayor: Oscar Meneghetti

Area
  - Total: 100.62 km^{2} (38.85 sq mi)
- Elevation: 908 m (2,979 ft)

Population (30 November 2021)
  - Total: 2,411
  - Density: 23.96/km^{2} (62.06/sq mi)
- Demonym: Comelicensi
- Time zone: UTC+1 (CET)
  - Summer (DST): UTC+2 (CEST)
- Postal code: 32045
- Dialing code: 0435
- Website: Official website

Santo Stefano di Cadore is a town in the province of Belluno, in the northern Italian region of Veneto.

== Twin towns ==
Santo Stefano di Cadore is twinned with:

- Montespertoli, Italy
