= Kreuzberg Pass =

Kreuzbergpass
- Location within Alps
- Elevation: 1,636 metres (5,367 ft)

Third Approach
- Location: South Tyrol/Province of Belluno, Italy
- Range: Dolomites/Carnic Alps
- Coordinates: 46°39′21″N 12°25′13″E

The Kreuzbergpass (Italian: Passo Monte Croce di Comelico; German: Kreuzbergpass; Sappada German: Kraizpèrk) (1636 m) is a high mountain pass between the provinces of South Tyrol and Belluno in Italy. It connects the Puster Valley with Cadore.

The pass is also the division line between the Dolomites to the west and the Carnic Alps to the northeast.

== See also ==
- List of highest paved roads in Europe
- List of mountain passes
