= Höhlensteintal =

Coordinates: 46.695°N 12.222°E

Val di Landro
- Höhlensteintal
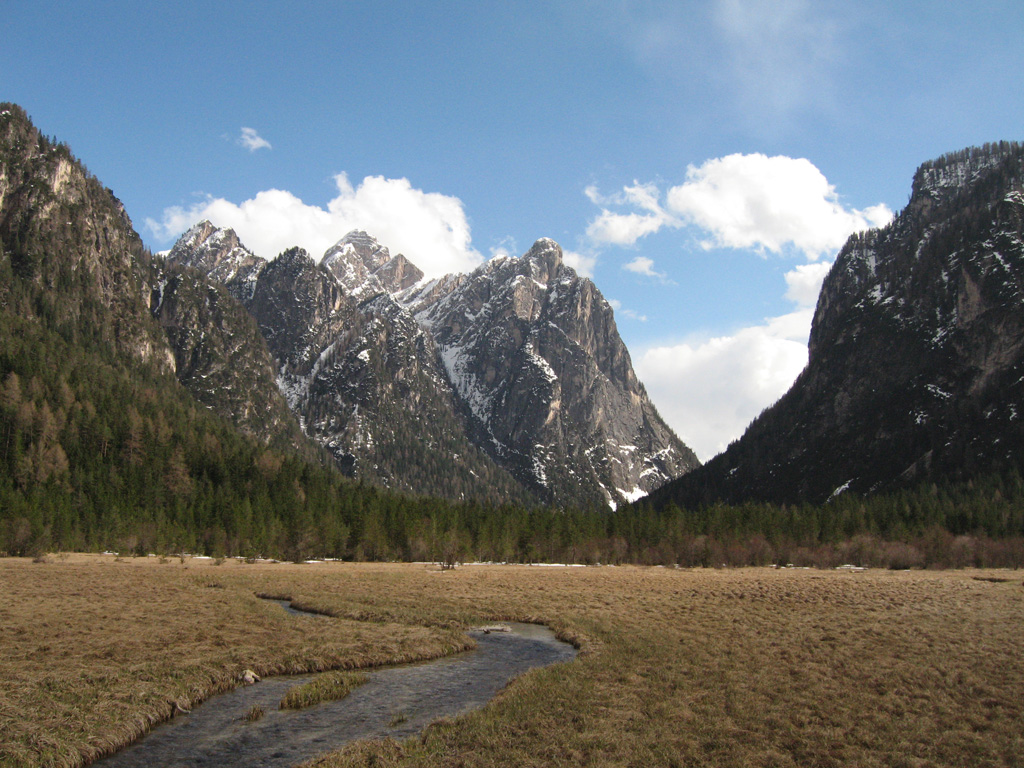

Geography
- Country: Italy
- State/Province: Trentino-Alto Adige
- District: South Tyrol
- Interactive map of Val di Landro

The Höhlensteintal (Italian: Val di Landro; German: Höhlensteintal) is a side valley of the Puster Valley in South Tyrol, Italy.

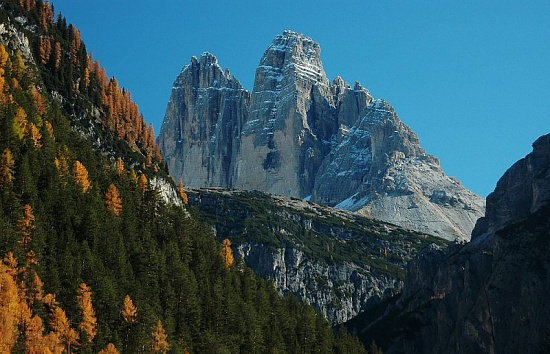
View from the west through the valley to the Drei Zinnen
