= Alpini Battalion "Tirano" =

Inactive Italian Army mountain infantry unit

- Battaglione Alpini "Tirano"
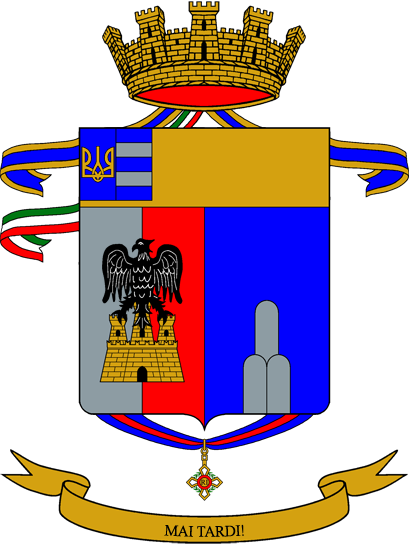
- Battalion coat of arms
- Active: 1 Nov. 1886 – 10 Sept. 1943; 10 Sept. 1953 – 27 March 1991
- Country: Italy
- Branch: Italian Army
- Type: Mountain Infantry
- Part of: Alpine Brigade "Orobica"
- Garrison/HQ: Mals
- Motto(s): "Mai tardi!"
- Anniversaries: 26 January 1943
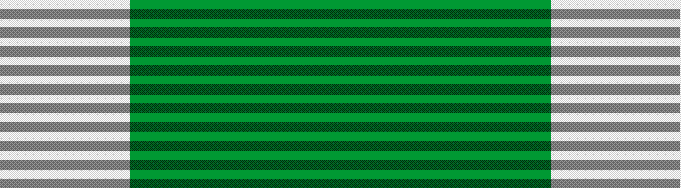
- Decorations: 1× Military Order of Italy; 2× Gold Medals of Military Valor; 1× Bronze Medal of Civil Valor; 1× Silver Medal of Merit

Insignia
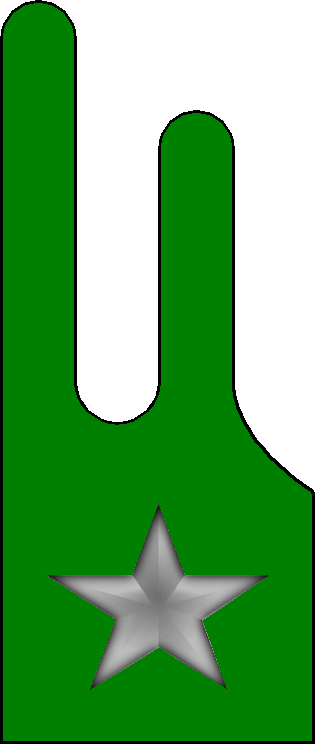
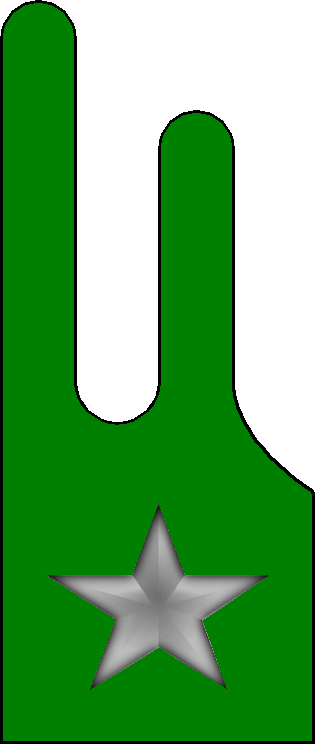
- Alpini gorget patches

The Alpini Battalion "Tirano" (Italian: Battaglione Alpini "Tirano") is an inactive mountain warfare battalion of the Italian Army based last in Mals in South Tyrol. The battalion belongs to the Italian Army's Alpini infantry speciality and was assigned to the Alpine Brigade "Orobica". The battalion was formed in 1886 and assigned to the 5th Alpini Regiment. During World War I the battalion fought in the alpine areas of the Italian front. In World War II the battalion fought in the invasion of France, the Greco-Italian War, and on the Eastern Front, where the battalion was almost completely destroyed during the Red Army's Operation Little Saturn in winter 1942–43. On 8 September 1943, the Armistice of Cassibile was announced and two days later, on 10 September 1943, invading German forces disbanded the 5th Alpini Regiment and its battalions.

The battalion was reformed in 1953 and once more assigned to the 5th Alpini Regiment. In 1975 the 5th Alpini Regiment was disbanded and the "Tirano" battalion became an autonomous unit, which in 1976 was granted its own flag. The battalion was assigned to the Alpine Brigade "Orobica". After the end of the Cold War the battalion was disbanded in 1991. The battalion's anniversary falls on 26 January 1943, the day of the Battle of Nikolayevka, during which the 5th Alpini Regiment and 6th Alpini Regiment broke through Soviet lines and opened an escape route for the retreating troops of the Alpine Army Corps.

== History ==
On 1 November 1886, the Royal Italian Army's Alpini battalions changed their names from their recruiting zones to the cities and towns, where their base was located. At the same time Alpini soldiers and non-commissioned officers were issued thread tufts, called Nappina in Italian, which were clipped to the Cappello Alpino headdress, and colored white for the troops of a regiment's first battalion, red for the troops of a regiment's second battalion, green for the troops of a regiment's third battalion, and blue for the troops of a regiment's fourth battalion. On the same day the 5th Alpini Regiment's Battalion "Alta Valtellina" based in Tirano was renamed Alpini Battalion "Tirano". As the regiment's second battalion the "Tirano" battalion's troops received a red Nappina. The battalion's recruiting area was the upper Valtellina valley. The battalion consisted of the 46th, 48th, and 49th Alpini Company.

In 1887–88 the "Tirano" battalion's 48th Alpini Company deployed to Massawa for the Italo-Ethiopian War of 1887–1889, which led to the establishment of the Italian colony of Eritrea. In December 1908 the 5th Alpini Regiment was deployed to the area of the Strait of Messina for the recovery efforts after the 1908 Messina earthquake. For its service the regiment was awarded a Silver Medal of Merit, which was affixed to the regiment's flag.

=== World War I ===
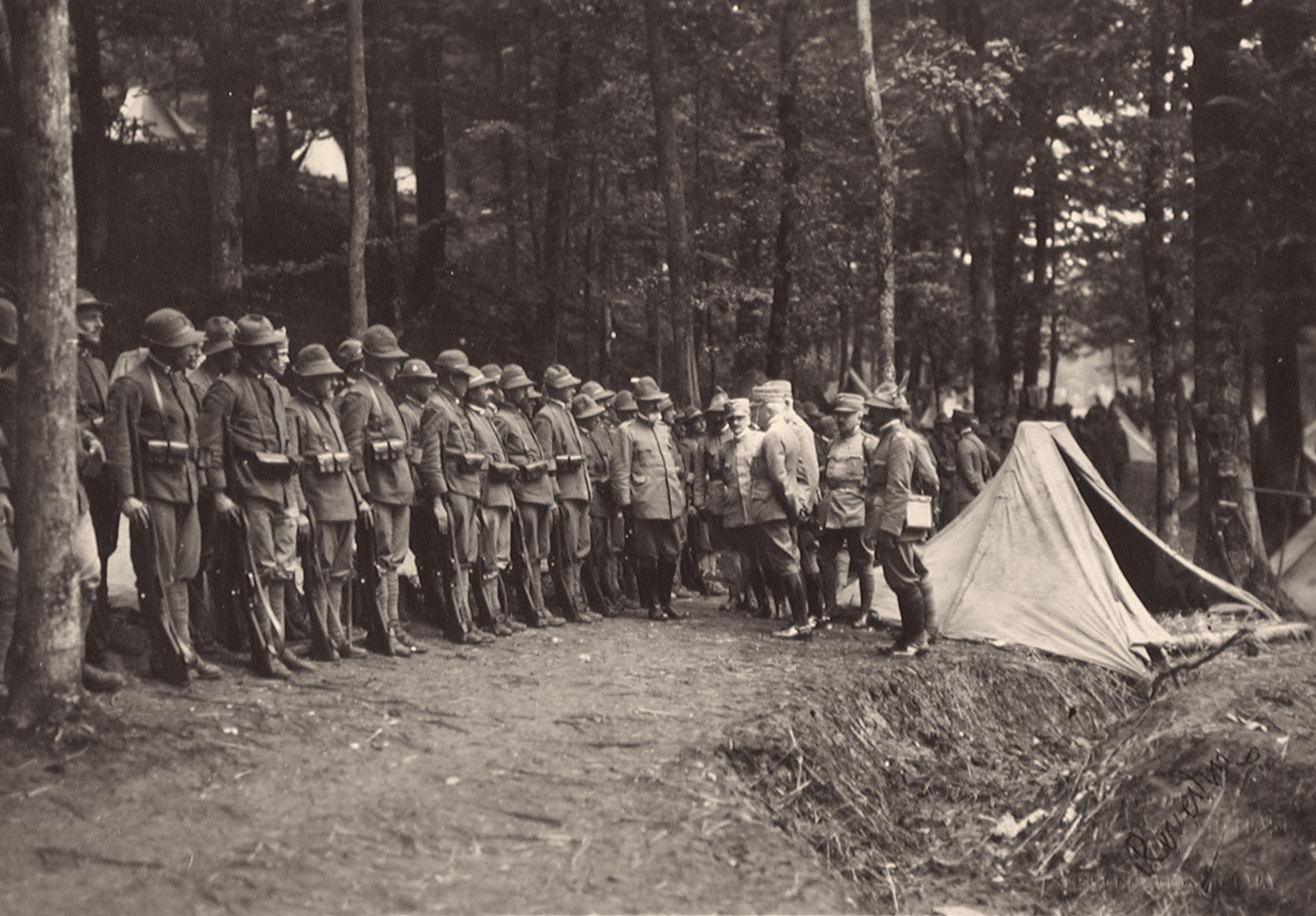
Alpini before the Battle of Mount Ortigara in June 1917

At the outbreak of World War I Italy declared its neutrality. In the autumn of 1914 the eight Alpini regiments formed 38 additional Alpini companies with men, who had completed their military service in the preceding four years. These companies were numbered from 80th to 117th and assigned to the existing Alpini battalions. The "Tirano" battalion formed two companies, the 89th, and 113th Alpini Company, and then consisted of five companies. In January 1915, each Alpini battalion began with the formation of a reserve battalion, with men, who had completed their military service at least four years, but not more than eleven years prior. These reserve battalions were named for a valley (Italian: Valle; abbreviated Val) located near their associated regular Alpini battalion's base, and the reserve battalions received the same Nappina as their associated regular Alpini battalion. On 10 March 1915, the "Tirano" battalion formed the Alpini Battalion "Valtellina", which consisted of the 246th, 248th, and 249th Alpini Company.

On 23 May 1915, Italy declared war on Austro-Hungary and the Alpini Battalion "Tirano" occupied position in the upper Valtellina. As the mountainous terrain of the Italian front made the deployment of entire Alpini regiments impracticable the Alpini battalions were employed either independently or assigned to groups, groupings, or infantry divisions as needed. By the end of 1915 the Alpini regiments began to form additional companies with recruits born in 1896. These new companies were numbered from 118th to 157th and were used, together with the 38 companies formed earlier, to form an additional reserve battalion for each regular battalion. These new battalions were named for a mountain (Italian: Monte) located near their associated regular Alpini battalion's base, and the reserve battalions received the same Nappina as their associated regular Alpini battalion. On 1 January 1916, the Alpini Battalion "Tirano" ceded the 89th, and 113th Alpini Company to the newly formed Alpini Battalion "Monte Stelvio", which also included the 137th Alpini Company.

In April 1916, the "Tirano" battalion was transferred to the Julian Alps and fought on Monte Vršič and then on Krasji Vrh. In February and March 1917 the Royal Italian Army formed twelve skiers battalions, each with two skiers companies. On 29 May 1917, the 24th Skiers Company was reorganized as 293rd Alpini Company and assigned to the Alpini Battalion "Monte Tonale", which was formed on the same day. The new battalion was assigned to the 5th Alpini Regiment and included, besides the 293rd Alpini Company, the newly formed 285th and 286th Alpini companies. The battalion was associated with the Alpini Battalion "Tirano" and therefore its troops wore a red Nappina.

In May 1917, the battalion was transferred to the Asiago Plateau, where it fought on Monte Forno. In June 1917, the battalion was assigned to the 1st Alpini Group for the Battle of Mount Ortigara. In January 1918, the battalion returned to the Asiago Plateau, where it fought on Col d'Echele and then on Monte Melago.

=== Interwar years ===
After the end of World War I the Alpini Battalion "Tirano" was once again assigned to the 5th Alpini Regiment. On 1 December 1923, the Gleno Dam collapsed and the regiment's Alpini Battalion "Tirano" was deployed to the affected area to search for survivors. For its work after the disaster the battalion was awarded a Bronze Medal of Civil Valor, which was affixed to the flag of the 5th Alpini Regiment and added to the regiment's coat of arms. On 31 October 1935, the II Superior Alpine Command "Tridentino" was reorganized as 2nd Alpine Division "Tridentina", which included the 5th Alpini Regiment, 6th Alpini Regiment, and 2nd Alpine Artillery Regiment "Tridentina". During the same year the 5th Alpini Regiment and the "Tirano" battalion moved to Meran.

=== World War II ===
On 10 June 1940, Italy entered World War II and the Alpini Battalion "Tirano", which consisted of a command company, and the 46th, 48th, and 49th Alpini companies, participated, together with the rest of the 5th Alpini Regiment, in the invasion of France.

==== Greco-Italian War ====
In November 1940, the 2nd Alpine Division "Tridentina" was transferred to Albania to shore up the crumbling Italian front during the Greco-Italian War. On 14 November 1940, the 5th Alpini Regiment entered the front in the upper Devoll valley. In December 1940, the regiment suffered heavy losses in the Greek counter-offensive. The regiment retreated into Albania, where it continued to fight until the German invasion of Greece in April 1941. The "Tridentina" division then pursued the retreating Greek forces to Leskovik and Ersekë. After the war's conclusion the division returned to Italy. For its conduct and service on the Greek front from 14 November to 30 December 1940 the 5th Alpini Regiment was awarded a Gold Medal of Military Valor, which was affixed to the regiment's flag and added to the regiment's coat of arms.

On 15 February 1942, the 5th Alpini Regiment formed a support weapons company for each of its three battalions and the Alpini Battalion "Tirano" received the 109th Support Weapons Company. These companies were equipped with Breda M37 machine guns, and 45mm Mod. 35 and 81mm Mod. 35 mortars.

==== Eastern Front ====
On 2 March 1942, the 2nd Alpine Division "Tridentina" was assigned, together with the 3rd Alpine Division "Julia" and 4th Alpine Division "Cuneense", to the Alpine Army Corps. The corps was assigned to the Italian 8th Army, which was readied to be deployed in summer 1942 to the Eastern Front.

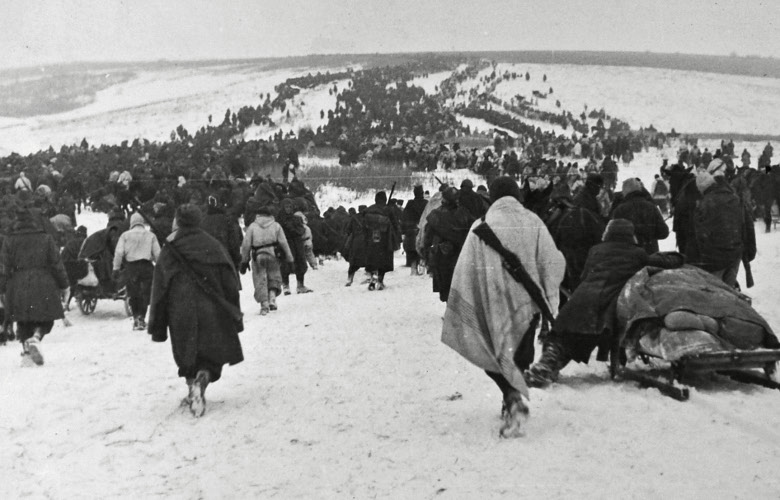
The Alpine Army Corps' retreat in Ukraine in January 1943

In July 1942 the three alpine division arrived in Eastern Ukraine, from where they marched eastwards towards the Don river. The Italian 8th Army covered the left flank of the German 6th Army, which spearheaded the German summer offensive of 1942 towards Stalingrad. On 12 December 1942, the Red Army commenced Operation Little Saturn, which, in its first stage, attacked and encircled the Italian II Army Corps and XXXV Army Corps, to the southeast of the Alpine Army Corps. On 13 January 1943, the Red Army launched the second stage of Operation Little Saturn with the Voronezh Front encircling and destroying the Hungarian Second Army to the northwest of the Alpine Army Corps.

On the evening of 17 January 1943, the Alpine Army Corps commander, General Gabriele Nasci, ordered a full retreat. At this point only the 2nd Alpine Division "Tridentina" was still capable of conducting combat operations. The 40,000-strong mass of stragglers — Alpini and Italians from other commands, plus German and Hungarians — followed the "Tridentina", which led the way westwards to the new Axis lines. As the Soviets had already occupied every village, bitter battles had to be fought to clear the way. On the morning of 26 January 1943, the spearheads of the "Tridentina' reached the hamlet of Nikolayevka, occupied by the Soviet 48th Guards Rifle Division. The Soviets had fortified the railway embankment on both sides of the village. General Nasci ordered a frontal assault and at 9:30 am the Battle of Nikolayevka began with the 6th Alpini Regiment leading the first attack. By noon the Italian forces had reached the outskirts of the village and the Alpine Army Corps' Chief of Staff General Giulio Martinat led the 5th Alpini Regiment forward for another assault, durich which General Martinat fell. By sunset the Alpini battalions were still struggling to break the Soviet lines and in a last effort to decide the battle before nightfall General Luigi Reverberi, the commanding General of the "Tridentina" division, ordered a human wave attack on the Soviet lines. The attack managed to break through the Soviet lines and the Italians continued their retreat, which was no longer contested by Soviet forces. On 1 February 1943 the remnants of the Alpine Army Corps reached Axis lines.

For its bravery and sacrifice in the Soviet Union the 5th Alpini Regiment was awarded a Gold Medal of Military Valor, which was affixed to the regiment's flag and added to the regiment's coat of arms. The 5th Alpini Regiment and its battalions were still in the process of being rebuilt, when the Armistice of Cassibile was announced on 8 September 1943. Two days later, on 10 September 1943, the regiment was disbanded by invading German forces.

=== Cold War ===
On 1 January 1953, the command of the 5th Alpini Regiment was reformed in Meran. On the same day the 5th Alpini Regiment joined the newly formed Alpine Brigade "Orobica", which also included the 5th Mountain Artillery Regiment. On 10 September 1953, the regiment reformed the Alpini Battalion "Tirano" in Meran. In 1954, the Alpini Battalion "Tirano" moved to Mals, with two of the battalion's companies based in the nearby city of Glurns. In 1957 the regiment formed the 5th Mortar Company, which was split on 31 December 1964 to form a mortar company for each of the regiment's three battalions. Afterwards the Alpini Battalion "Tirano" consisted of the following units:

- Alpini Battalion "Tirano", in Mals
  - Command and Services Company
  - 46th, 48th, and 49th Alpini Company (46th and 49th Alpini Company based in Glurns)
  - 109th Mortar Company

During the 1975 army reform the army disbanded the regimental level and newly independent battalions were granted for the first time their own flags. On 30 September 1975, the 5th Alpini Regiment was disbanded and the next day the regiment's three battalions became autonomous units and were assigned to the Alpine Brigade "Orobica". The Alpini Battalion "Tirano" consisted now of a command, a command and services company, three Alpini companies, and a heavy mortar company with eight 120mm Mod. 63 mortars. The battalion fielded now 950 men (45 officers, 96 non-commissioned officers, and 809 soldiers).

On 12 November 1976 the President of the Italian Republic Giovanni Leone granted the Alpini Battalion "Tirano" a new flag. At the same time the medals and military honors awarded to the "Tirano" battalion were transferred from the flag of the 5th Alpini Regiment to the battalion's flag, while the medals and military honors awarded to the entire regiment were duplicated for the flag of the battalion. Consequently, the "Tirano" battalion's flag was decorated with one Military Order of Italy, two Gold Medals of Military Valor, one Bronze Medal of Civil Valor, and one Silver Medal of Merit. The first four awards were also added to the battalion's newly created coat of arms.

=== Recent times ===
After the end of the Cold War Italian Army began to draw down its forces and on 27 March 1991 the Alpini Battalion "Tirano" was disbanded and the following 10 April the battalion's flag transferred to the Shrine of the Flags in the Vittoriano in Rome.
