= 4th Heavy Field Artillery Regiment (Italy) =

Inactive Italian Army artillery unit

- 4° Reggimento Artiglieria Pesante Campale
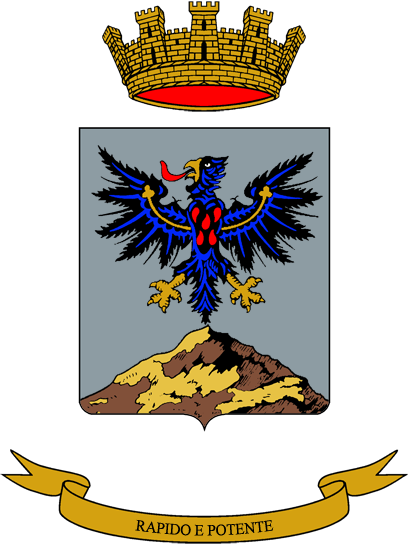
- Regimental coat of arms
- Active: 1 Aug. 1920 – 25 Sept. 1944; 11 Feb. 1952 – 4 Sept. 1992
- Country: Italy
- Branch: Italian Army
- Part of: 4th Alpine Army Corps
- Garrison/HQ: Trento
- Motto: "Rapido e potente"
- Anniversaries: 15 June 1918 – Second Battle of the Piave River

Insignia
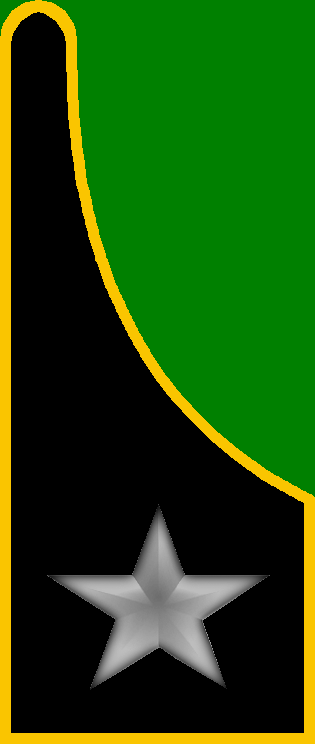
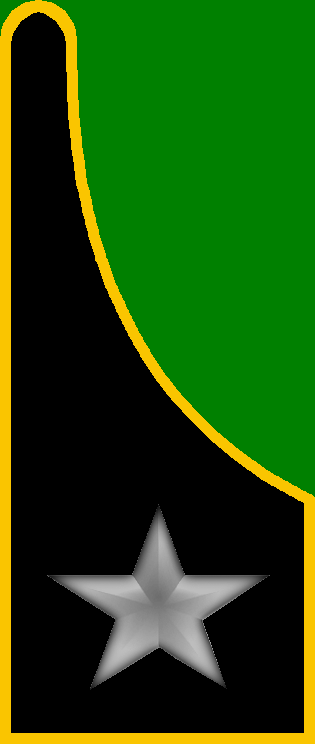
- Regimental gorget patches

The 4th Heavy Field Artillery Regiment (Italian: 4° Reggimento Artiglieria Pesante Campale) is an inactive artillery regiment of the Italian Army, which was based in Trento in Trentino and assigned to the 4th Alpine Army Corps. Originally an artillery regiment of the Royal Italian Army, the regiment was formed in 1920 with pre-existing groups, which had fought during World War I on the Italian front. During World War II the regiment formed the 4th and 40th army corps artillery groupings. The 4th Army Corps Artillery Grouping participated in 1940 in the invasion of France and in 1943 joined the Italian Co-belligerent Army on the allied side. The 40th Army Corps Artillery Grouping fought in 1941 in the Greco-Italian War and in 1943 against the allies during the invasion of Sicily. The 40th Army Corps Artillery Grouping, which had retreated from Sicily to Calabria in Southern Italy, and the regiment were disbanded by invading German forces after the announcement of the Armistice of Cassibile on 8 September 1943, while the 4th Army Corps Artillery Grouping remained active as a training unit until September 1944.

The regiment was reformed in 1952 in Trento as 4th Heavy Field Artillery Regiment and assigned to the IV Army Corps. In 1986 the regiment was reduced to 4th Heavy Field Artillery Group "Pusteria". In 1992 the group was disbanded and the flag of the 4th Heavy Field Artillery Regiment was transferred to the Shrine of the Flags in the Vittoriano in Rome.

The regimental anniversary falls, as for all Italian Army artillery regiments, on June 15, the beginning of the Second Battle of the Piave River in 1918. This article is about the Royal Italian Army's 4th Heavy Field Artillery Regiment, which was a support unit assigned to a corps-level command. This regiment is unrelated to the 4th Heavy Artillery Regiment, which was a support unit assigned to an army-level command, and unrelated to the 4th Field Artillery Regiment, which was a support unit assigned to a division-level command.

== History ==
On 1 August 1920 the 3rd Heavy Field Artillery Regiment was formed in Vigevano. The new regiment's command was formed with the personnel of the disbanded 42nd Field Artillery Regiment and the personnel of the 18th Heavy Field Artillery Grouping, which had been formed for service World War I. The regiment consisted of four groups, which had fought in World War I on the Italian front: the I and II cannons groups were the former XVIII and XXXIX cannons groups, which had been formed during the war by the depot of the 1st Heavy Field Artillery Regiment, respectively the depot of the 2nd Heavy Field Artillery Regiment. The new regiment's III and IV howitzers groups were the former VI Howitzers Group, which had been formed by the depot of the 2nd Heavy Field Artillery Regiment, and the former XXX Howitzers Group, which had been formed by the depot of the 6th Field Artillery Regiment. The new regiment's I and II groups were equipped with 105/28 cannons, while the III and IV groups were equipped with 149/12 howitzers. On 1 November 1926 the 3rd Heavy Field Artillery Regiment and 4th Heavy Field Artillery Regiment switched numbers, and the new 4th Heavy Field Artillery Regiment moved from Vigevano to Mantua.

On 14 February 1928 the regiment received an auto-transported group from the Horse Artillery Regiment, which the regiment ceded on 15 September 1931 to help from the Light Artillery Regiment. On 1 October 1934 the regiment was renamed 4th Army Corps Artillery Regiment. On 23 January 1935 the regiment incorporated the V Motorized Group with 75/27 mod. 11 field guns, which had been transferred from the 23rd Artillery Regiment "Timavo" of the 12th Infantry Division "Timavo". The same year the regiment moved from Mantua to Trento and on 15 August the regiment ceded the V Motorized Group to the newly formed 46th Artillery Regiment "Trento". In 1935–36 the regiment provided three officers and 98 enlisted to augment units deployed for the Second Italo-Ethiopian War.

In 1936 the regiment moved from Trento to Rovereto, where the regiment, on 15 September 1936, formed a new V Motorized Group. On 1 February 1939 the regiment's depot in Rovereto formed the 132nd Armored Artillery Regiment and on 10 February the regiment transferred its V Motorized Group to the new regiment, which was assigned to the 132nd Armored Division "Ariete"

=== World War II ===
At the outbreak of World War II the regiment consisted of a command and four groups. During the war the regiment's depot in Rovereto formed and mobilized the following unit commands:

- 4th Army Corps Artillery Grouping
- 40th Army Corps Artillery Grouping
- 60th Coastal Artillery Grouping, which was assigned to the XVIII Coastal Brigade based in Sicily
- IX Cannons Group with 105/28 cannons
- XXVIII Cannons Group with 105/28 cannons
- XLV Cannons Group with 105/28 cannons
- LXI Cannons Group with 105/32 heavy field guns
- CXLV Howitzers Group with 149/12 howitzers
- CIX Howitzers Group with 149/13 heavy howitzers
- CXXVIII Howitzers Group with 149/13 heavy howitzers
- CXXIX Howitzers Group with 149/13 heavy howitzers
- CLI Howitzers Group with 149/19 heavy howitzers
- CLII Howitzers Group with 149/19 heavy howitzers
- CLIII Howitzers Group with 149/19 heavy howitzers
- XXX Replacements Group with 105/32 heavy field guns
- 4th Army Corps Specialists Unit

The regiment's depot also formed and mobilized the batteries for the group commands. The groups operated either under command of army corps artillery groupings or as autonomous units. The depot was disbanded by invading German forces after the announcement of the Armistice of Cassibile on 8 September 1943.

- 4th Army Corps Artillery Grouping: the grouping was mobilized on 27 September 1939 and consisted of a command, a command unit, the IX and XXVIII cannons groups with 105/28 cannons, the CIX, CXXVIII, and CXXIX howitzers groups with 149/13 heavy howitzers, and the 4th Army Corps Specialists Unit. In this configuration the grouping participated in June 1940 in the invasion of France. In April 1942 the grouping included the newly formed CLI, CLII, and CLIII howitzers groups with 149/19 heavy howitzers. In January 1943 the grouping transferred the CXXVIII and CXXIX howitzers groups with 149/13 heavy howitzers to the XIII Army Corps in Sardinia, and the CLII and CLIII howitzers groups with 149/19 heavy howitzers to the 6th Army in Sicily. The grouping was transferred to Martina Franca in Southern Apulia and assigned to the IX Army Corps. The grouping now fielded only the CLXVI and CLXVII howitzers groups with 149/19 heavy howitzers. After the announcement of the Armistice of Cassibile on 8 September 1943 the grouping sided with the King of Italy Victor Emmanuel II and joined the Italian Co-belligerent Army on the allied side. On 15 September 1943 the grouping joined the newly formed LI Army Corps and now also included the CLXXI Cannons Group with 149/19 heavy howitzers, which had been mobilized by the 2nd Army Corps Artillery Regiment. The grouping's personnel and materiel are used to form new units and replenish existing ones. The grouping was disbanded on 25 September 1944.
- 40th Army Corps Artillery Grouping: the grouping was formed in March 1941 and consisted of a command, a command unit, the CX Howitzers Group with 149/13 heavy howitzers, which had been mobilized by the 14th Army Corps Artillery Regiment, and the XIII Cannons Group with 105/28 cannons and the CXIII Howitzers Group with 149/13 heavy howitzers, which had both been mobilized by the 8th Army Corps Artillery Regiment. The grouping was transferred to Albania as reinforcements for the Greco-Italian War. After the war the grouping remained in Albania until October 1942. In November of the same year the grouping was transferred to Sicily and assigned to XVI Army Corps, which was responsible for the defense of Sicily to the East of a line from Cefalù to Gela. The grouping now consisted of the X, XVI, and XXIX cannons groups with 105/28 cannons, and the CIX and CX howitzers groups with 149/13 heavy howitzers. In July 1943 the grouping fought against allied forces during the Allied invasion of Sicily. The grouping was heavily attrited in the fighting and the survivors were evacuated to Calabria in mainland Italy in early August, where, later in the same month, the grouping was declared lost due to wartime events.

=== Cold War ===
On 11 February 1952 the 4th Heavy Field Artillery Regiment was reformed in Trento. The regiment was assigned to the IV Army Corps and consisted of a command, a command unit, and the I and II groups with 149/19 heavy howitzers. On 1 March 1953 the regiment formed the III Group with 149/19 heavy howitzers. In May 1954 the regiment formed a Light Aircraft Section with L-21B artillery observation planes and in August 1957 the regiment's groups were equipped with M114 155mm howitzers. On 16 September 1963 the Light Aircraft Section was transferred to the Carnia-Cadore Troops Command.

On 20 September 1973 the regiment's III Group was placed in reserve status and on 1 October of the same year regiment incorporated the IV and V groups with M59 155mm field guns, which had been the I and II groups of the disbanded 9th Heavy Artillery Regiment. On 10 June 1974 the IV Group was placed in reserve status, followed by the II Group on 10 December of the same year. The latter group was soon thereafter disbanded. As part of the 1975 army reform the support units of the 4th Alpine Army Corps became alpine troops units. Consequently, the troops of the 4th Heavy Field Artillery Regiment replaced their artillery berets with the alpine troops' Cappello Alpino, and their artillery gorget patches with mountain artillery gorget patches. On 10 January 1976 the regiment formed the Recruits Training Company "Monte Calisio", which was tasked with training the recruits for the artillery support units of the 4th Alpine Army Corps. Afterwards the regiment consisted of the following units:

- 4th Heavy Field Artillery Regiment, in Trento
  - Command and Services Battery
  - 1st Group with M114 155mm howitzers
  - 2nd Group with M114 155mm howitzers (Reserve)
  - 3rd Group with M59 155mm field guns (Reserve)
  - 4th Group with M59 155mm field guns
  - Recruits Training Company "Monte Calisio"

On 8 August 1979 the Recruits Training Company "Monte Calisio" was disbanded. On 31 October 1986 the 4th Heavy Field Artillery Regiment was disbanded and the next day, 1 November 1986, the regiment's 1st Group became an autonomous unit and was renamed 4th Heavy Field Artillery Group "Pusteria". The group was assigned the flag and traditions of the 4th Heavy Field Artillery Regiment and named for the 5th Alpine Division "Pusteria", which in turn had been named for the Puster Valley (Italian: Val Pusteria). The group was assigned to the 4th Alpine Army Corps and consisted of a command, a command and services battery, and three batteries with FH70 155mm howitzers.

=== Recent times ===
On 4 September 1992 the 4th Heavy Field Artillery Group "Pusteria" was disbanded and on 30 September of the same year the flag of the 4th Heavy Field Artillery Regiment was returned to the Shrine of the Flags in the Vittoriano in Rome.
