= Logistic Regiment "Julia" =

Active Italian Army brigade logistics unit

- Reggimento Logistico "Julia"
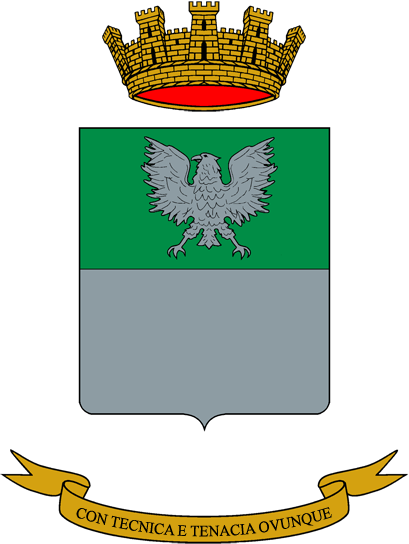
- Regimental coat of arms
- Active: 1 Nov. 1986 – today
- Country: Italy
- Branch: Italian Army
- Role: Military logistics
- Part of: Alpine Brigade "Julia"
- Garrison/HQ: Meran
- Motto(s): "Con tecnica e tenacia ovunque"
- Anniversaries: 22 May 1916 – Battle of Asiago
- Decorations: 1× Silver Cross of Army Merit

Insignia
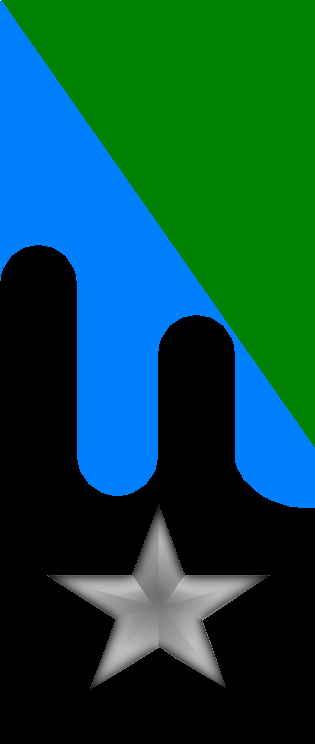
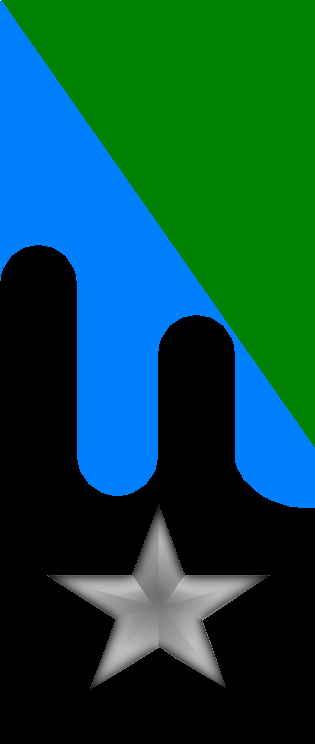
- Unit gorget patches

The Logistic Regiment "Julia" (Italian: Reggimento Logistico "Julia") is a military logistics regiment of the Italian Army based in Meran in South Tyrol. Today the regiment is the logistic unit of the Alpine Brigade "Julia" and shares with the brigade's infantry troops, the Alpini, the distinctive Cappello Alpino. The regiment's anniversary falls, as for all units of the Italian Army's Transport and Materiel Corps, on 22 May, the anniversary of the Royal Italian Army's first major use of automobiles to transport reinforcements to the Asiago plateau to counter the Austro-Hungarian Asiago Offensive in May 1916.

== History ==
=== Cold War ===
On 15 September 1969, the IV Resupply, Repairs, Recovery Unit was formed in Bolzano as support unit of the IV Army Corps. On 1 October 1981, the unit was reorganized and renamed 4th Maneuver Logistic Battalion. Initially the battalion consisted of a command, a command and services company, a supply company, a maintenance company. On 31 August 1982, the 4th Army Corps Auto Group "Claudia" in Eppan was disbanded and the next day the disbanded group's two mixed auto units were used to form a medium transport company and two mixed transport companies, which were assigned to the 4th Maneuver Logistic Battalion.

On 1 November 1986, as part of the 1986 army reform, the battalion was renamed 24th Maneuver Logistic Battalion "Dolomiti". As per army naming convention for logistic units supporting corps-level commands the battalion was named for a geographic feature in the corps' area of operations; in case of the 24th battalion for the Dolomites mountains (Italian: Dolomiti).

On 13 July 1987, President of the Italian Republic Francesco Cossiga granted the battalion a flag, which arrived in Bolzano on 22 May 1988. On 11 July 1991, the 24th Maneuver Logistic Battalion "Dolomiti" moved from Bolzano to Meran, where, on 27 July 1991, the battalion incorporated the personnel and materiel of the disbanded Logistic Battalion "Orobica" of the Alpine Brigade "Orobica".

During the 1990s the "Dolomiti" battalion participated in international peacekeeping missions in Albania, Somalia (Unified Task Force and United Nations Operation in Somalia II) and Mozambique (United Nations Operation in Mozambique).

=== Recent times ===
On 14 September 1994, the 24th Maneuver Logistic Battalion "Dolomiti" lost its autonomy and the next day the battalion entered the newly formed 24th Maneuver Logistic Regiment "Dolomiti". At the same time the regiment also incorporated the 41st Medical Unit (Reserve) and 42nd Medical Unit (Reserve).

On 1 February 2001, the regiment was transferred from the Alpine Troops Command to the Logistic Projection Brigade and was renamed 24th Alpine Maneuver Regiment. The regiment now consisted of a supply battalion, a maintenance battalion, and a medical unit. In October 2013, the regiment was transferred to the Alpine Brigade "Julia". On 1 January 2015, the regiment was renamed Logistic Regiment "Julia". For its conduct and work during the COVID-19 pandemic the regiment was awarded in 2022 a Silver Cross of Army Merit, which was affixed to the regiment's flag.

== Organization ==
As of 2024 the Logistic Regiment "Julia" is organized as follows:

- Logistic Regiment "Julia", in Merano
  - Command and Logistic Support Company
  - Logistic Battalion "Dolomiti"
    - Transport Company
    - Maintenance Company
    - Supply Company

== See also ==
- Military logistics
