= Mountain Artillery Group "Sondrio" =

Inactive Italian Army mountain artillery unit

- Gruppo Artiglieria da Montagna "Sondrio"
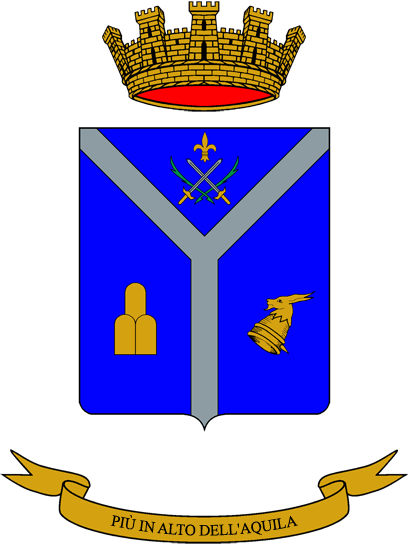
- Group coat of arms
- Active: 1 Oct. 1975 – 24 Oct. 1989
- Country: Italy
- Branch: Italian Army
- Part of: Alpine Brigade "Orobica"
- Garrison/HQ: Sterzing
- Motto(s): "Più in alto dell'aquila"
- Anniversaries: 15 June 1918 – Second Battle of the Piave River

Insignia
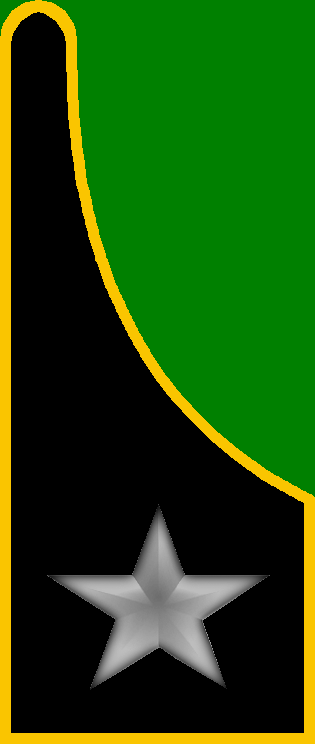
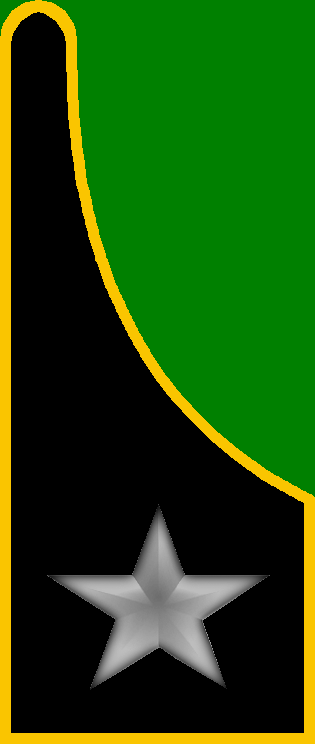
- Regimental gorget patches

The Mountain Artillery Group "Sondrio" (Italian: Gruppo Artiglieria da Montagna "Sondrio") is an inactive mountain artillery group of the Italian Army, which was based in Sterzing in South Tyrol. The group consisted of batteries formed in 1915, which had served in World War I on the Italian front. During World War II the batteries were assigned to the Alpine Artillery Group "Val d'Orco" of the 6th Alpine Artillery Regiment (Italy). The Mountain Artillery Group "Sondrio" was formed in 1953 and assigned to the 5th Mountain Artillery Regiment of the Alpine Brigade "Orobica". In 1975 the group became an autonomous unit and was granted a flag and coat of arms. After the end of the Cold War the group was disbanded in 1989.

The Italian mountain artillery has served since its inception alongside the infantry's Alpini speciality, with whom the mountain artillery shares the distinctive Cappello Alpino. The regimental anniversary falls, as for all Italian Army artillery units, on June 15, the beginning of the Second Battle of the Piave River in 1918.

== History ==
=== World War I ===
In March 1915 the 51st and 52nd mountain artillery batteries were formed by the depot the 1st Mountain Artillery Regiment in Turin and in November 1916 the 53rd Mountain Artillery Battery by the depot the 3rd Mountain Artillery Regiment in Bergamo. During World War I three batteries served on the Italian front and were disbanded after the conflict, with the exception of the 51st Battery, which was deployed to Libya in 1919 and disbanded at the end of that year.

=== World War II ===
In 1939 the three batteries were reformed by the depot of the 1st Alpine Artillery Regiment "Taurinense" and assigned to the Alpine Artillery Group "Val d'Orco". In June 1940, during the invasion of France, the group was attached to the Alpine Grouping "Levanna". In November of the same year the group was transferred to Albania for the Greco-Italian War, during which the group was attached to the 2nd Alpine Division "Tridentina". After the war the group was repatriated to Italy and based in Pallanza. On 15 November 1941 the Group "Val d'Orco" was assigned to the newly formed 6th Alpine Artillery Regiment, which in January 1942 was sent to Montenegro on occupation and anti-partisan duties. The Group "Val d'Orco" remained in Italy and was assigned to the 3rd Alpine Valley Group, which in August 1942 was reorganized as XX Skiers Grouping. The grouping was deployed to occupied France, where it was disbanded after the announcement of the Armistice of Cassibile on 8 September 1943.

=== Cold War ===
On 1 July 1953 the 5th Mountain Artillery Regiment was reformed in Meran and assigned to the Alpine Brigade "Orobica". The regiment included the Mountain Artillery Group "Sondrio" with two batteries equipped with 100/17 mod. 14 howitzers. The group was based in Schlanders and was named for the city of Sondrio at the Northern edge of the Orobic Alps. On 15 March 1955 the army's General Staff ordered that also the groups with 100/17 mod. 14 howitzers should receive traditional mountain battery numbers and consequently the batteries of the Mountain Artillery Group "Sondrio" received the numbers and traditions of the batteries of the Alpine Artillery Group "Val d'Orco". The group then consisted of the following units:

- Mountain Artillery Group "Sondrio", in Schlanders
  - Command Unit
  - 51st Battery, with 100/17 mod. 14 howitzers
  - 52nd Battery, with 100/17 mod. 14 howitzers

In 1957 the regiment formed the 53rd Battery for the Group "Sondrio". In 1959 the regiment received 105/14 mod. 56 pack howitzers and each of the three groups now fielded two howitzer batteries and one mortar battery equipped with Brandt AM-50 120mm mortars. In 1963 the Group "Sondrio" moved from Schlanders to Sterzing.

- Mountain Artillery Group "Sondrio", in Sterzing
  - Command Unit
  - 51st Battery, with 105/14 mod. 56 pack howitzers
  - 52nd Battery, with 105/14 mod. 56 pack howitzers
  - 53rd Battery, with Brandt AM-50 120mm mortars

In 1970 the group's mortar battery was equipped with 105/14 mod. 56 pack howitzers.

During the 1975 army reform the army disbanded the regimental level and newly independent battalions and groups were granted for the first time their own flags. On 30 September the 5th Mountain Artillery Regiment was disbanded and the next day the Mountain Artillery Group "Sondrio" became an autonomous unit and was assigned to the Alpine Brigade "Orobica". The group consisted of a command, a command and services battery, and three batteries with 105/14 mod. 56 pack howitzers, with one of the batteries being mule-carried. At the time the group fielded 610 men (35 officers, 55 non-commissioned officers, and 520 soldiers).

On 12 November 1976 the President of the Italian Republic Giovanni Leone issued decree 846, which granted the Mountain Artillery Group "Sondrio" a new flag. On 26 September 1982 the Mountain Artillery Group "Sondrio" was equipped with M114 155mm howitzers.

=== Recent times ===
After the end of the Cold War the Italian Army began to draw down its forces. On 24 October 1989 the 53rd Battery and the Command and Services Battery of the Mountain Artillery Group "Sondrio" were disbanded, while the 51st and 52nd batteries were transferred to the Mountain Artillery Group "Bergamo". On 26 October of the same year the flag of the Mountain Artillery Group "Sondrio" was transferred to the Shrine of the Flags in the Vittoriano in Rome.
