= 4th Army Corps Auto Group "Claudia" =

Inactive Italian Army transport unit

- 4° Autogruppo di Corpo d'Armata "Claudia"
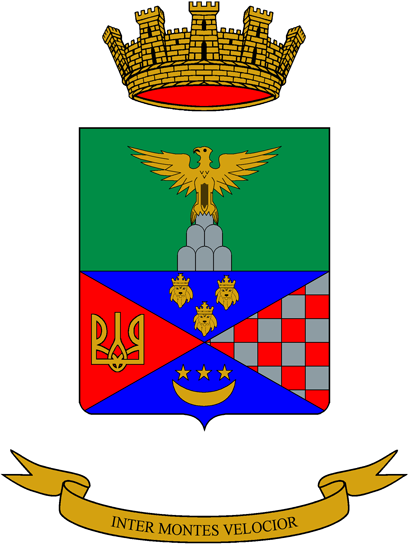
- Group coat of arms
- Active: 1 Oct. 1976 – 31 Aug. 1982
- Country: Italy
- Branch: Italian Army
- Role: Military logistics
- Part of: 4th Alpine Army Corps
- Garrison/HQ: Eppan
- Motto: "Inter montes velocior"
- Anniversaries: 22 May 1916 – Battle of Asiago

Insignia
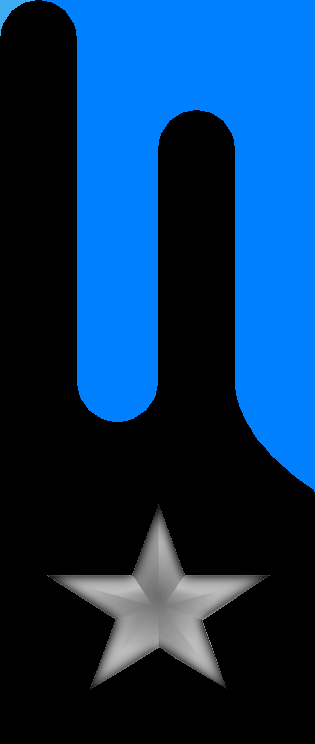
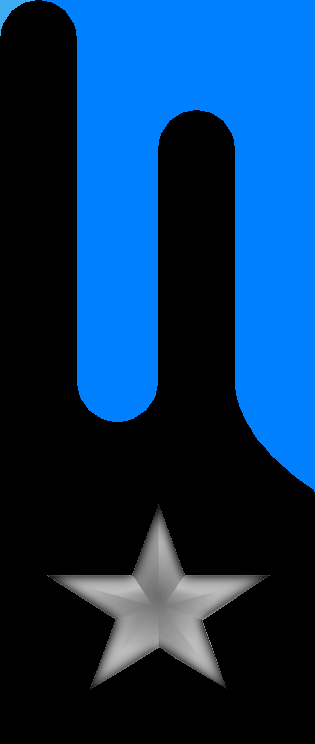
- Unit gorget patches

The 4th Army Corps Auto Group "Claudia" (Italian: 4° Autogruppo di Corpo d'Armata "Claudia") is an inactive military logistics battalion of the Italian Army, which was based in Eppan in South Tyrol. Originally a transport regiment of the Royal Italian Army, the unit was last active from 1976 to 1982. The group's anniversary falls, as for all units of the Italian Army's Transport and Materiel Corps, on 22 May, the anniversary of the Royal Italian Army's first major use of automobiles to transport reinforcements to the Asiago plateau to counter the Austro-Hungarian Asiago Offensive in May 1916.

== History ==
=== Interwar years ===
In August 1920, the III Automobilistic Center was formed in Verona and assigned to the III Army Corps. In 1923, the center was disbanded and its personnel and materiel used to form the III Auto Grouping, which consisted of a command, an auto group, a railway group, and a depot. On 30 September 1926, the grouping was disbanded and the next day its personnel and vehicles were used to form the 4th Automobilistic Center. The center consisted of a command, the IV Automobilistic Group, and a depot. The three companies of the disbanded railway group were assigned to the 8th Field Artillery Regiment, 9th Field Artillery Regiment, and 20th Field Artillery Regiment.

In 1935–36, the center mobilized 3,000 troops to augment units deployed for the Second Italo-Ethiopian War. On 16 July 1935, the center formed the XI Auto Group, which deployed with the 1st Motorized Division "Trento" to Libya for the duration of the war. After the war's conclusion, the XI Auto Group returned to Italy, where the group was renumbered 30 September 1936 XXIV Auto Group and assigned to the 46th Motorized Artillery Regiment.

=== World War II ===
In 1939, the 4th Automobilistic Center moved from Verona to Bolzano. On 1 July 1942, the center was renamed 4th Drivers Regiment. In the evening of 8 September 1943, the Armistice of Cassibile, which ended hostilities between the Kingdom of Italy and the Anglo-American Allies, was announced by General Dwight D. Eisenhower on Radio Algiers and by Marshal Pietro Badoglio on Italian radio. Germany reacted by invading Italy and the 4th Drivers Regiment was disbanded soon thereafter by German forces. During World War II the center mobilized in its depot in Bolzano among others the following units:

- 5th Auto Grouping Command
- 50th Auto Grouping Command (designated 105th Marching Drivers Regiment until 21 July 1943)
- VIII Trucks Auto Group
- X Heavy Auto Group
- XXIII Heavy Auto Group
- XXIV Heavy Auto Group
- XLI Mixed Auto Group
- XLII Mixed Auto Group
- 27 × auto units, including:
  - 9th Mixed Auto Unit for the 102nd Motorized Division "Trento"
  - 132nd Mixed Auto Unit for the 132nd Armored Division "Ariete"
  - 185th Heavy Auto Unit for the 52nd Infantry Division "Torino"
  - 190th Heavy Auto Unit for the 9th Infantry Division "Pasubio"
  - 206th Mixed Auto Unit for the 2nd Alpine Division "Tridentina"
  - 208th Mixed Auto Unit for the 5th Alpine Division "Pusteria"
  - 213th Mixed Auto Unit for the 3rd Cavalry Division "Principe Amedeo Duca d'Aosta"
  - 218th Heavy Auto Unit for the 3rd Cavalry Division "Principe Amedeo Duca d'Aosta"
  - 219th Heavy Auto Unit for the 3rd Cavalry Division "Principe Amedeo Duca d'Aosta"

=== Cold War ===
On 1 March 1947, the 4th Drivers Center was formed in Trento, which consisted of a command, the 4th Auto Unit, the 4th Vehicles Park, a fuel depot, and a depot. The center supported the IV Territorial Military Command of the Northeastern Military Region. The unit was tasked with the transport of fuel, ammunition, and materiel between the military region's depots and the logistic supply points of the army's divisions and brigades. On 1 June 1948, the center moved from Trento to Bolzano. On 1 March 1949, the 4th Vehicles Park was transferred to the 4th Automotive Repair Shop. On 1 May 1952, the IV Territorial Military Command was reorganized as IV Army Corps. On 1 May 1957, the center formed the 1st Mixed Auto Unit for the IV Army Corps. On 13 August of the same year, the 4th Drivers Center was disbanded and the 4th Auto Unit was assigned to the Northeastern Military Region.

On 1 July 1961, the 1st Mixed Auto Unit and 4th Auto Unit were merged to form the 4th Army Corps Auto Group, which was based in Eppan. The group was assigned to the IV Army Corps and consisted of a command, the 1st Mixed Auto Unit, 2nd Mixed Auto Unit (the former 4th Auto Unit), and a light workshop.

On 1 October 1976, as part of the 1975 army reform, the 4th Army Corps Auto Group was renamed 4th Army Corps Auto Group "Claudia". The group consisted of a command, a command unit, and two mixed auto units. Like all Italian Army transport units the group was named for a historic road near its base, in case of the 4th Army Corps Auto Group for the Roman road Via Claudia, which crossed the Alps and connected Italy with Rhaetia in southern Germany.

On 12 November 1976, the President of the Italian Republic Giovanni Leone granted with decree 846 the group a flag and assigned the group the traditions of the 4th Drivers Regiment.

On 31 August 1982, the 4th Army Corps Auto Group "Claudia" was disbanded and the group's 1st Mixed Auto Unit and 2nd Mixed Auto Unit were transferred to the 4th Maneuver Logistic Battalion in Bolzano. The two units were reorganized into a medium transport company and a mixed transport company. On 1 September 1982, the group's flag was transferred to the Shrine of the Flags in the Vittoriano in Rome for safekeeping.

== See also ==
- Military logistics
