= Giulio Martinat =

Italian general

- Born: 24 February 1891; Perrero, Kingdom of Italy
- Died: 26 January 1943 (aged 51); Nikolayevka, Soviet Union
- Military career
- Allegiance: Kingdom of Italy
- Branch: Royal Italian Army
- Rank: Brigadier-General
- Commands: "Pinerolo" Alpini Battalion; 11th Alpini Regiment
- Conflicts: Italo-Turkish War; World War I; Second Italo-Ethiopian War; World War II; Greco-Italian War; Italian campaign on the Eastern Front; Battle of Nikolayevka
- Awards: Gold Medal of Military Valour (posthumous); Silver Medal of Military Valour (twice); Bronze Medal of Military Valour (twice); Military Order of Savoy; Knight's Cross of the Iron Cross (posthumous)

Giulio Martinat (24 February 1891 – 26 January 1943) was a brigadier general in the Italian armed forces during World War II. He was killed while leading his men in the Battle of Nikolayevka.

Born in a small town of Perrero, of Waldensian religion, he enrolled in the Italian Army at a young age and fought in the conquest of Libya in 1911. In 1935 he participated in the conquest of Ethiopia and in 1939 in that of Albania, where he distinguished himself; from 1937 to 1941 he was chief of staff of the 3rd Alpine Division Julia.

In 1939 he published the book Il grande capo d'una grande impresa militare, edited by the Società di Studi Valdesi (Society of Waldensian Studies), about the qualities of the Duke of Aosta in 1690 against the French. In 1940 he participated in the Greco-Italian War as Chief of Staff of the Corpo d'Armata Alpino (Alpine Army Corps), and on 17 July 1942, again as Chief of Staff of the Corpo d'Armata Alpino, now part of the Armata Italiana in Russia (ARMIR), he departed for the Eastern Front. In November he was promoted to Brigadier-General.

In January 1943 Martinat led the Italian forces during the Battle of Nikolayevka, trying to open an escape route for the surviving Italian troops trying to break out of the Soviet encirclement during Operation Little Saturn, being killed in action; he was posthumously awarded the Gold Medal of Military Valour by the Italian government, and the Knight's Cross of the Iron Cross by the German government. Upon seeing the Alpini of the Edolo battalion, Martinat reportedly said "with the Edolo [Battalion] I started, with the Edolo [Battalion] I want to end" (the Edolo battalion had been the first unit where he had served); he took up a rifle, led his men in battle, and was killed. His assault helped open the road for the Italian breakout at the Battle of Nikolayevka.

The town of Perrero, where was born, dedicated a monument to him in May 1950.

== Bibliography ==
- Bedeschi, Giulio. Centomila gavette di ghiaccio. Mursia editore. Milano, 1994 ISBN 88-425-1746-1
- Fellgiebel, Walther-Peer (2000) [1986]. Die Träger des Ritterkreuzes des Eisernen Kreuzes 1939–1945 — Die Inhaber der höchsten Auszeichnung des Zweiten Weltkrieges aller Wehrmachtteile [The Bearers of the Knight's Cross of the Iron Cross 1939–1945 — The Owners of the Highest Award of the Second World War of all Wehrmacht Branches] (in German). Friedberg, Germany: Podzun-Pallas. ISBN 978-3-7909-0284-6.

== See also ==
- Battle of Nikolayevka
- List of foreign recipients of the Knight's Cross of the Iron Cross
