= Alpine Brigade "Orobica" =

Brigata Alpina Orobica
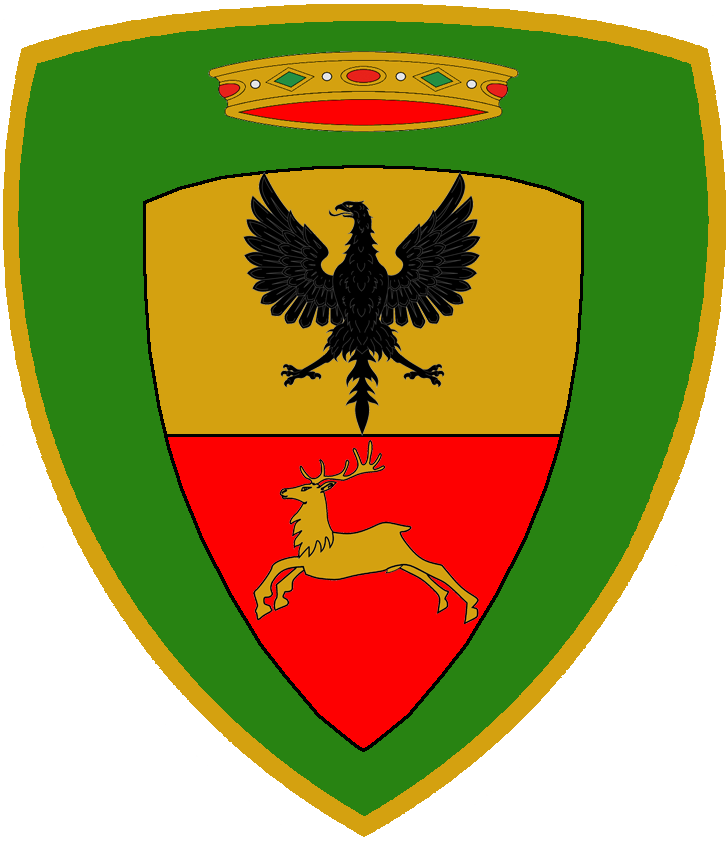
- Coat of Arms of the Alpine Brigade "Orobica"
- Active: 1 January 1953 – 27 July 1991
- Country: Italy
- Branch: Italian Army
- Type: Alpini
- Role: Mountain Infantry
- Part of: IV Army Corps; 1953–1991
- Garrison/HQ: Meran

The Alpine Brigade "Orobica" was a light Infantry brigade of the Italian Army, specializing in mountain warfare. Its core units were Alpini, the mountain infantry corps of the Italian Army, that distinguished itself in combat during World War I and World War II.

== Constitution ==
The "Orobica" was constituted on 1 January 1953 in the city of Meran. The brigade's name alludes to the Bergamo Alps, which are called Alpi Orobie in Italian, and where most units of the brigade initially originated. The Brigade also drew the majority of its recruits from this region. Accordingly, the brigade's coat of arms was modeled after the coat of arms of the Province of Bergamo. During its existence the brigade's units were all based in the western and northern half of the province of South Tyrol. The brigade was tasked with the defence of the vital Brenner and Reschen mountain passes. The brigade's strength was around 3000 men and initially its composition was:

- Alpine Brigade "Orobica", in Meran
  - Brigade Headquarters, in Meran
  - 5th Alpini Regiment, in Meran
    - Command Company, in Meran
    - Alpini Battalion "Tirano", in Mals and Glurns
    - Alpini Battalion "Edolo", in Meran
    - 5th Mortar Company, in Meran
  - 5th Mountain Artillery Regiment, Meran
    - Command Battery, in Meran
    - Mountain Artillery Group "Bergamo", in Schlanders
    - Mountain Artillery Group "Sondrio", in Sterzing
    - Mountain Artillery Group "Vestone", in Meran
  - Signal Company "Orobica", in Meran

In the following years the brigade was augmented with further units:

- Engineer Company "Orobica", in Meran (raised in 1954)
- 22nd Frontier Defense Regiment, in Meran (joined in 1954, disbanded on 31 December 1962)
  - XXIX Battalion, in Sterzing (renamed Alpini Battalion "Val Chiese" on 1 July 1963)
  - XXX Battalion, in Mals (reduced to reserve unit on 31 December 1962 and two companies passed to the XXIX Battalion, renamed Alpini Battalion "Val Camonica" on 1 July 1963, disbanded in 1964)
- Alpini Battalion "Morbegno" (raised in 1956) in Sterzing
- Alpini Paratroopers Platoon (raised in 1956)
- Light Aircraft Section "Orobica", in Meran (formed in 1957 and expanded to Light Aircraft Unit in 1966)

The Alpini Paratroopers Platoon merged with the paratrooper platoons of the other four alpine brigades on 1 April 1964 to form the Alpini Paratroopers Company in Bolzano under direct command of the 4th Army Corps. The same year the 5th Mortar Company was disbanded and its mortars and troops divided among the brigade's three Alpini battalions.

== 1975 reorganization ==
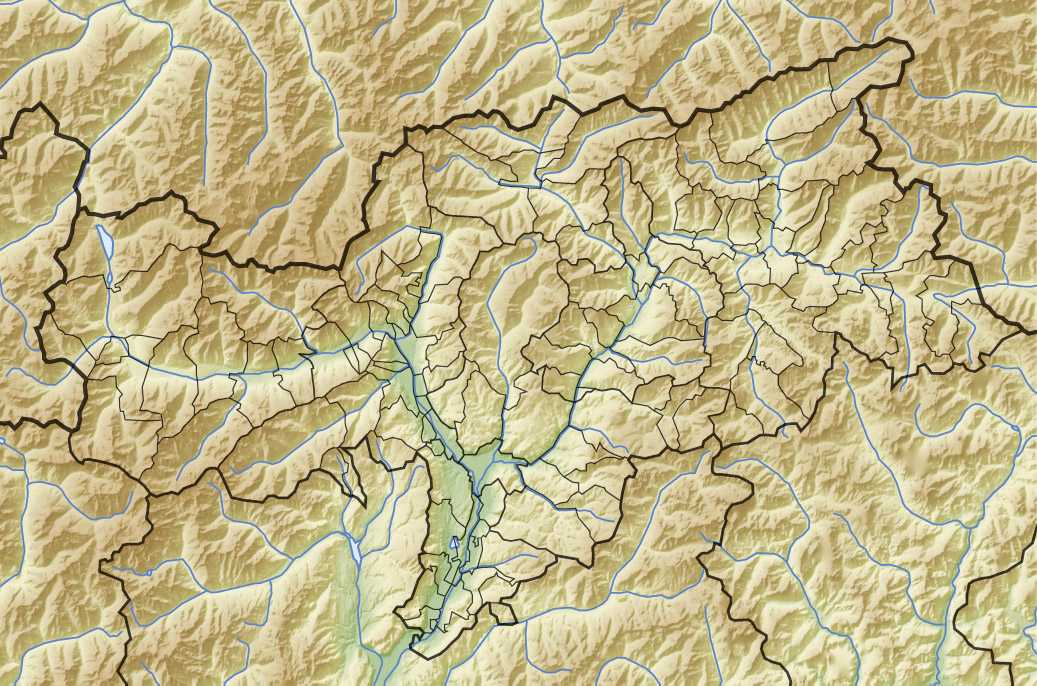
Orobica locations 1989

With 1975 Italian Army reform the regimental level was abolished and battalions came under direct command of multi-arms brigades. At the same time the army reduced and realigned its forces and therefore the Orobica saw some changes to its composition: the 5th Alpini Regiment, 5th Mountain Artillery Regiment, and Mountain Artillery Group "Vestone" were disbanded, while the brigade headquarters and the signal company were merged to form the Command and Signal Unit "Orobica". An anti-tank company was raised, the Light Aircraft Unit "Orobica" was transferred to the newly formed 4th Army Light Aviation Regiment "Altair" of the 4th Army Corps, the Services Grouping "Orobica" was reorganized as a logistic battalion, and the Alpini Battalion "Edolo" became a training unit.

After the reform the brigade's two Alpini battalions had an authorized strength of 950 men, with the exception of the "Val Chiese" Battalion, which was tasked to man fortifications in the Wipptal, Passeier and Vinschgau valleys. The "Val Chiese" fielded three active and three reserve companies with a wartime strength of more than 1,000 men. The two artillery groups had an authorized strength of 610 men and fielded 18 M56 105 mm pack howitzers each. The new composition was:

- Alpine Brigade "Orobica", in Meran
  - Command and Signal Unit "Orobica", in Meran
  - Alpini Battalion "Morbegno", in Sterzing
    - Headquarters and Service Company
    - 44th Alpini Company
    - 45th Alpini Company
    - 47th Alpini Company
    - 107th Heavy Mortar Company
  - Alpini Battalion "Tirano", in Mals and Glurns
    - Headquarters and Service Company
    - 46th Alpini Company
    - 48th Alpini Company
    - 49th Alpini Company
    - 109th Heavy Mortar Company
  - Alpini (Recruits Training) Battalion "Edolo", in Meran
    - Headquarters and Service Company
    - 50th Alpini (Training) Company
    - 51st Alpini (Training) Company
    - 52nd Alpini (Training) Company
    - 110th Alpini (Training) Company
  - Alpini Battalion "Val Chiese", in Sterzing (reduced to reserve unit on 30 June 1979)
    - Headquarters and Service Company
    - 250th Alpini Company, in Saltaus (Type C^{*}, ex "Val Camonica")
    - 251st Alpini Company, in Reschen (Type A^{*}, ex "Val Camonica")
    - 253rd Alpini Company, in Brenner (Type A, remained active after 1979)
    - 254th Alpini Company, in Gossensaß (Type A)
    - 255th Alpini Company, in Pfitsch (Type C)
    - 364th Alpini Company, in Franzensfeste (Type C)
  - Mountain Artillery Group "Bergamo", in Schlanders
    - Headquarters and Service Battery
    - 31st Mountain Artillery Battery
    - 32nd Mountain Artillery Battery
    - 33rd Mountain Artillery Battery
  - Mountain Artillery Group "Sondrio", in Sterzing
    - Headquarters and Service Battery
    - 51st Mountain Artillery Battery
    - 52nd Mountain Artillery Battery
    - 53rd Mountain Artillery Battery
  - Logistic Battalion "Orobica", in Meran
    - Command and Services Platoon
    - 1st Light Logistic Unit
    - 2nd Light Logistic Unit
    - Medium Logistic Unit
  - Anti-tank Company "Orobica", in Meran
  - Engineer Company "Orobica", in Meran
- _{Type A = fortification fully equipped, provisioned and manned; close support platoon onsite}
- _{Type B = fortification fully equipped, provisioned and manned; close support platoon off site}
- _{Type C = fortification fully equipped; provisions, crew and close support platoon off site}

=== Strategic plans in case of war ===
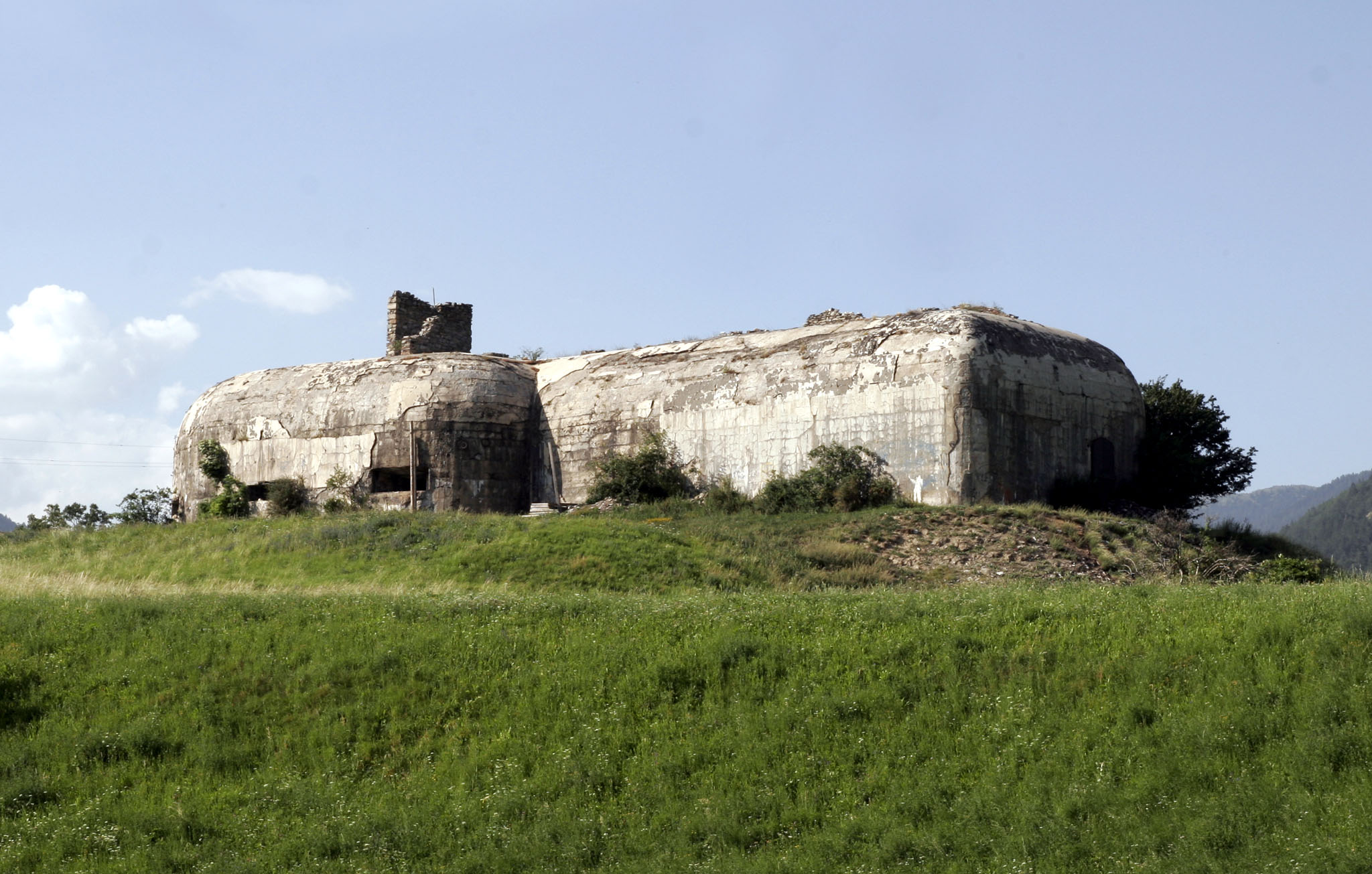
Alpine wall bunker in Mals

After the 1975 reform the 4th Alpine Army Corps was responsible to defend the Italian border along the main chain of the alps from the Swiss-Austrian-Italian border tripoint in the west to the Italian-Yugoslavian border in the east. In case of war with Yugoslavia the 4th Alpine Army Corps would remain static in its position guarding the left flank of the 5th Army Corps, which would meet the enemy forces in the plains of Friuli-Venezia Giulia. The only brigade which would have seen combat in such a case would have been the Julia.

In case of a war with the Warsaw Pact the 4th Alpine Army Corps had two war planes: one in the case the Soviet Southern Group of Forces and Hungarian Army would march through Yugoslavia and the other in case the Warsaw Pact would violate the Austrian neutrality and march through Austria. In case the enemy forces would come through Yugoslavia, the Julia would cover the mountainous left flank of the 5th Army Corps, which with its four armoured and five mechanized brigades would try to wear down the enemy before it could break out into the North Italian Padan plain. The other alpine brigades would remain static.

In the more likely case the Soviet and Hungarian divisions would invade Austria and march through Southern Styria and through the Drava valley in Carinthia the alpine brigades would have been the first front line units of the Italian Army. The Julia would have defended the Canal Valley, the Cadore the Piave valley, and the Tridentina the Puster Valley, while the Taurinense would remain in reserve. Officially the Orobica, with its two Alpini battalions and two Mountain Artillery groups, was tasked with defending the vital Reschen and Brenner passes. However, the true mission of the Orobica was to advance into neutral Austria and link up with the German 23rd Gebirgsjäger Brigade of NATO's Central Army Group in Southern Germany. It was considered vital to establish a line of communication between the Italian Army and the allied armies fighting in Germany. Therefore, the Alpini Battalion "Morbegno" and the Mountain Artillery Group "Sondrio" based in Sterzing would have advanced over the Brenner Pass and through the Wipp valley until Innsbruck, where they would have linked up with German and American forces coming from Mittenwald and through the lower Inn Valley, while the Alpini Battalion "Tirano" in Mals supported by the Mountain Artillery Group "Bergamo" in Schlanders would have crossed the Reschen pass and advanced until Landeck, where they would have linked up with German units coming over the Fern Pass. Although Austrian military defence plans envisioned a strong defence around Innsbruck to deny an invading force the use of the many important roads crossing the city, there was a tacit understanding that NATO forces would not be opposed if Warsaw Pact forces had invaded Austria first.

To aid in the defence of the narrow mountain valleys, the 4th Army Corps re-activated some fortifications of the World War II era Alpine Wall. In the area of operation of the Orobica the following fortified lines of defence were re-activated during the Cold War:

In the Vinschgau and Passeier valleys:

- Saltaus: 4 bunker, 169 men, 250th Alpini Company (Italian Wikipedia: Sbarramento di Saltusio)
- Mals-Glurns: 9 bunker, no troops assigned after 1964 (before 1964 the 252nd Alpini Company) (Italian Wikipedia: Sbarramento Malles-Glorenza)
- Reschen pass: 9 bunker, 254 men, 251st Alpini Company (Italian Wikipedia: Sbarramento Passo Resia)

In the Eisack Valley:

- Brenner pass: 5 bunker, 136 men, 253rd Alpini Company (Italian Wikipedia: Sbarramento Brennero)
- Gossensaß: 7 bunker 190 men, 254th Alpini Company (Italian Wikipedia: Sbarramento di Tenne-Novale)
- Pfitsch: 3 bunker, 121 men, 255th Alpini Company (Italian Wikipedia: Sbarramento di Saletto)
- Franzensfeste: 5 bunker, 165 men, 364th Alpini Company (Italian Wikipedia: Sbarramento di Fortezza)

The defences were to be manned by the troops of the Alpini Battalion "Val Chiese" headquartered in Sterzing which had six companies dislocated throughout South Tyrol. However, in 1979 the battalion was put into reserve status with only the 253rd Alpini Company remaining on active duty and tasked to maintain and service all the bunker within the Orobica's area of operation.

== Today ==
In 1989 the Mountain Artillery Group "Sondrio" was disbanded, followed by the Alpini Battalion "Tirano" on 26 March 1991. The brigade was disbanded on 27 July 1991 and the remaining units (Alpini battalions "Morbegno" and "Edolo", Mountain Artillery Group "Bergamo" and the Anti-tank Company) passed to the Alpine Brigade "Tridentina". The Logistic Battalion "Orobica" was disbanded and parts of it absorbed by the 24th Maneuver Logistic Battalion "Dolomiti".
