= Livenka, Belgorod Oblast =

Livenka Ливенка
- Selo
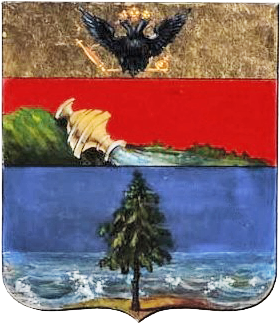
- Coat of arms

- Location within Belgorod Oblast Location within Russia
- Coordinates: 50°27′19″N 38°17′32″E
- Country: Russia
- Region: Belgorod Oblast
- District: Krasnogvardeysky District
- Time zone: UTC+3:00

Livenka (Russian: Ливенка) is a rural locality (a selo) in Krasnogvardeysky District of Belgorod Oblast, Russia, located 29 kilometers (18 mi) from the town of Biryuch, the administrative center of the district. Population: 3,487 (2021 census); 3,870 (2010 census); 4,101 (2002 census).

== History ==
It was founded in 1681 by Vasily Livenets as an outpost settlement.

The settlement now encompasses the site where the Battle of Nikolayevka (named according to the Second World War Italian military maps) was fought between Italian and Soviet forces in January 1943.

== Geography ==
The village, crossed in the middle by the river Valuy, lies 25 km (16 mi) south of Biryuch, the district capital, and 47 km (29 mi) north of Valuyki. It is 75 km (47 mi) far from Ukrainian border, in Kharkiv Oblast.
