= Comando Truppe Alpine =

Command of the Italian Army

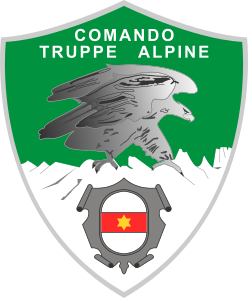
- Coat of Arms of the Alpine Troops Command
- Active: 4º Corpo d'Armata; 1 May 1945; Comando Truppe Alpine; 1 October 1997 - today
- Country: Kingdom of Italy; Italian Republic
- Branch: Royal Italian Army; Italian Army
- Type: Alpini
- Size: 2 Brigades
- Part of: Operational Land Forces Command
- Garrison/HQ: Bolzano (South Tyrol)
- Engagements: War in Afghanistan

The Comando Truppe Alpine (Alpine Troops Command) or COMTA (formerly also COMALP) commands the Mountain Troops of the Italian Army, called Alpini (singular: Alpino) and various support and training units. It is the successor to the 4º Corpo d'Armata Alpino (4th Alpine Army Corps) of the Cold War. The Alpini are light Infantry units specializing in Mountain Combat. The subordinate units of the COMTA distinguished themselves during combat in World War I and World War II.

== History ==
=== Origins ===
The history of the COMTA begins after the Second Italian War of Independence. Following the Italian-French victory over the Austrian Empire, the Kingdom of Sardinia annexed the Papal Legations in present-day Emilia Romagna. Thus on 25 March 1860 the 4th Higher Military Command was activated as a territorial command in Bologna and tasked to defend the newly acquired territory between the Panaro river and the Adriatic Sea. The command consisted of the 4th, 7th and 13th division of the Line.

At the outbreak of the Third Italian War of Independence the command covered the right flank of the main army and remained static along the river Po. The command under General Enrico Cialdini consisted of the 11th, 12th, 13th, 14th, 15th, 17th, 18th and 20th division of the line. However, when the main Italian army failed to break through the Austrian Quadrilatero fortress system south of Lake Garda the V Army Corps marched six divisions over the Apennine Mountains, joined up with the IV Army Corps in the Romagna and crossed the lower Po and Adige rivers in force on 15 July 1866. Cialdini bypassed the Austrian fortresses and main army on his left flank and marched his army all through the Veneto, dispatching one division under Giacomo Medici to invade Trentino and cut the Austrian line of retreat and three divisions under Raffaele Cadorna to march at speed to the city of Trieste. Cialdinis army finally reached the Isonzo river on 24 July 1866.

After the Kingdom of Sardinia extended its borders northward following the war by annexing the territory of Veneto the 4th Higher Military Command was disbanded in spring of 1867. On 15 August 1870 the IV Army Corps was activated for the short campaign to capture of Rome. After the troops of the corps had entered Rome the corps was turned into the General Army Command, which was tasked with garrison duties in Rome. During the campaign the corps commanded the 2nd, 9th, 11th, 12th and 13th division of the line.

In 1873 the command was renamed as 4th General Command and transferred to Florence to act as territorial command for Tuscany. On 22 January 1877 the corps was renamed as IV Army Corps and transferred to Piacenza. In 1888 the corps moved to Genoa.

=== World War I ===
In spring 1915, the corps under general Mario Nicolis di Robilant was moved towards the Austrian border and saw its first combat during the battle for Monte Nero (today Krn) in the Julian Alps. At the outbreak of the war the corps consisted of the 7th and 8th Division of the Line (Infantry), the 33rd Territorial Division, the elite Bersaglieri Division and two division sized Alpini formations:

- IV Army Corps (Lieutenant General Mario Nicolis di Robilant)
  - 7th Division (Major General D'Avanzo)
    - Brigade "Bergamo"
      - 25th Infantry Regiment
      - 26th Infantry Regiment
    - Brigade "Valtellina"
      - 65th Infantry Regiment
      - 66th Infantry Regiment
    - 21st Field Artillery Regiment (8x batteries)
    - V Group / 1st Heavy Field Artillery Regiment (2x batteries)
    - VI Group "Udine" / 2nd Mountain Artillery Regiment (4x batteries)
    - 1st Sapper Company / 1st Engineer Regiment
    - Divisional Service units
  - 8th Division (Major General Lang)
    - Brigade "Modena"
      - 41st Infantry Regiment
      - 42nd Infantry Regiment
    - Brigade "Salerno"
      - 89th Infantry Regiment
      - 90th Infantry Regiment
    - 28th Field Artillery Regiment (8x batteries)
    - Divisional Service units
  - 33rd Division (Major General Ricci)
    - Brigade "Emilia"
      - 119th Infantry Regiment
      - 120th Infantry Regiment
    - Brigade "Liguria"
      - 120th Infantry Regiment
      - 158th Infantry Regiment
    - 40th Field Artillery Regiment (6x batteries)
    - 14th Sapper Company / 1st Engineer Regiment
    - Divisional Service units
  - Bersaglieri Division (Major General Raspi)
    - I Bersaglieri Brigade
      - 6th Bersaglieri Regiment (XIII, XVI, XIX Bersaglieri battalions)
      - 9th Bersaglieri Regiment (XXVIII, XXX, XXXII Bersaglieri battalions)
    - II Bersaglieri Brigade
      - 11th Bersaglieri Regiment (XXVII, XXXIII, XXXIX Bersaglieri battalions)
      - 12th Bersaglieri Regiment (XXI, XXIII, XXXVI Bersaglieri battalions)
    - IV Group "Mondovì" / 1st Mountain Artillery Regiment (4x batteries)
    - 17th Sapper Company / 1st Engineer Regiment
    - Divisional Service units
  - Alpini Group A (Colonel Tedeschi)
    - 4th Alpini Regiment ("Ivrea", "Aosta", "Intra", "Val d'Orco", "Val Baltea", and "Val Toce" Alpini battalions)
    - "Cividale" and "Val Natisone" Alpini battalions (detached from the 8th Alpini Regiment)
    - XI Group "Bergamo" / 3rd Mountain Artillery Regiment (4x batteries)
  - Alpini Group B (Colonel Alliana)
    - 3rd Alpini Regiment ("Pinerolo", "Exilles", "Susa", "Val Pellice", "Val Dora", "Val Cenischia" Alpini battalions)
    - III Group "Torino-Pinerolo" / 1st Mountain Artillery Regiment (4x batteries)
  - 5th Bersaglieri Regiment (V, XIV, XXIV, XLVI Bersaglieri battalions)
  - 4th Field Artillery Regiment (8x batteries)
  - IV Group / 1st Heavy Field Artillery Regiment (2x batteries)
  - 1st Telegraph Engineers Company
  - Army Corps Service units

For the rest of the war the corps fought on the Isonzo front. In the twelfth battle of the Isonzo the corps was covering the northern flank of the Italian 2nd Army between Mount Rombon and Dolje. The main Austro-German attack was aimed at the Italian IV and XXVII Corps. The Italian defences were quickly overcome and the rapid advance cut the IV Corps' line of retreat. Most of the men and material of the IV Corps were captured by the Central Powers troops and the corps was not raised again until the end of the war.

=== World War II ===
After World War I the corps was moved once again to Bologna until it moved to Verona in 1927 and tasked with territorial and defence duties along the valley of the Adige. The corps consisted of the 9th Infantry Division "Pasubio" in Verona and the 11th Infantry Division "Brennero" in Bolzano. In 1935 the corps was moved to Bolzano, but quickly dispatched to reinforce the Italian troops that faced stiffer than expected resistance during the Italian invasion of Abyssinia. The corps commanded the 5th Infantry Division "Cosseria", 1st Blackshirt Division "23 March" and 5th Blackshirt Division "1° Febbraio". During the campaign in Abyssinia the IV Army Corps participated in the Battle of Shire.

After the return from Abyssinia the corps was tasked with defending the Northern borders of Italy. Specifically in the case of war with Hitler's Third Reich the corps was tasked with manning the Alpine Wall in South Tyrol and delaying the advancing enemy for as long as possible. Although Germany and Italy signed the Pact of Steel in 1939 the construction of the fortifications along the Alpine Wall continued unabated.

When Italy declared war on France on 10 June 1940 the corps was near the French-Italian border. The Italian Army only performed limited patrols and remained in its positions until after France had asked for an armistice on 20 June 1940. The next day the Italian divisions crossed the border in force, but stiff French resistance stopped them along the entire front after a few kilometres. During the campaign the corps commanded the 2nd Mountain Infantry Division "Sforzesca", 26th Mountain Infantry Division "Assietta" and 3rd Alpini Regiment.

After the Italian invasion of Greece in October 1940 bogged down under stiff Greek resistance the IV Army Corps was dispatched to Albania to augment the Italian forces along the Epirus front. The corps commanded the 5th Alpine Division "Pusteria" and the 22nd Infantry Division "Cacciatori delle Alpi". After the war the corps returned to Bolzano.

In July 1942 Benito Mussolini decided to scale up the Italian war effort in the Soviet Union. Seven fresh divisions were sent to Southern Russia to augment the existing Italian Expeditionary Corps in Russia. The 2nd Alpine Division "Tridentina", 3rd Alpine Division "Julia" and 4th Alpine Division "Cuneense" were sent to Russia and came under a newly raised corps, which was named Alpine Army Corps; the first time an Italian corps carried the name "Alpine". The three Alpini divisions were joined by the 156th Infantry Division "Vicenza", which performed garrison duties in the corps' rear area.

The corps and most of its troops were annihilated in January 1943 during the Soviet Operation Little Saturn. The Italian front along the Don was broken by Soviet armoured and mechanized forces on 16 December 1942, but as the Soviet forces turned South towards Rostov-on-Don on the Black Sea to cut off the German Army Group A fighting in the Caucasus and the German 4th Panzer Army, which was in the midst of Operation Wintergewitter — the attempt to relieve the 6th Army in Stalingrad — the Italian Alpine Corps continued to hold the front along the Don. But on 13 January 1943, the Soviets began the second stage of Operation Saturn and launched the four armies of General Filipp Golikov's Voronezh Front against the Hungarian Second Army on the left flank of the Alpine Corps. Within three days the Alpini found themselves flanked on both sides by Soviet armoured and mechanized units and 200 km away from the new Axis lines. On 17 January the commanding general of the corps Lieutenant General Gabriele Nasci finally ordered a full retreat. About 40,000 men formed two columns that followed the Tridentina division which, supported by a handful of German armoured vehicles, led the way westwards to the new Axis front. The Soviets had already occupied every village and bitter battles were fought by the soldiers of the Tridentina to clear the way. On 26 January 1943 the corps' remnants finally broke free from the Soviet encirclement at the Battle of Nikolayevka and reached Axis lines on 1 February 1943. In fifteen days the soldiers covered 200 km on foot, fought twenty-two battles and spent fourteen nights camped in the middle of the Russian steppe. Temperatures during the night fell between −30 °C (−20 °F) and −40 °C (−40 °F).

The losses were staggering: the "Cuneense" and "Julia" had been annihilated: the Cuneense counted 1,607 survivors out of 17,460 men deployed, the Julia counted less than 1,200 survivors of 17,460 men deployed. The "Tridentina" was somewhat in better shape having managed to bring 4,250 men through the Russian lines. The "Vicenza" hat counted 10,466 men at the beginning of the Soviet offensive, 7,760 of which were killed or missing after the division's remnants reached Axis lines. The worst hit unit was the 2nd Alpini Regiment which saw 208 men survive out of 5,206 deployed. In total the corps suffered 34,170 killed in action and 9,400 wounded in action out of 57,000 men at the beginning of the battle.

The remnants of the divisions were repatriated and, along with the IV Corps, which was at this point on garrison duty in Durrës, disbanded in September 1943 after Germany invaded Italy following the Italian-Allied armistice. For the remainder of the war the headquarters of the IV Corps in Bolzano became the headquarters of the Gestapo for the Operationszone Alpenvorland.

Alpine Army Corps organization during the campaign in the Soviet Union

=== Cold War ===
After the German Army Group C in Italy surrendered on 29 April 1945 with hostilities formally ending on 2 May 1945 Italy immediately sent a military higher command to Bolzano to activate there as the IV Territorial Military Command and ensure that the province of South Tyrol would not be reunited with Austria. On 1 May 1952 the command was renamed as IV Army Corps and became one of the three active duty Army Corps of the Italian Army. At first the Corps only commanded the Infantry Division "Friuli" and 6th Alpini Regiment. However, in 1949 the Friuli moved to Florence and the IV Army Corps only consisted of the 6th Alpini Regiment and a few support units.

In the following years the corps added the following major units:

- 1 April 1951 Armored Division "Centauro", in Verona
- 1 May 1951 Alpine Brigade "Tridentina", in Brixen
- 1 January 1953 Alpine Brigade "Orobica", in Meran

In 1951 the corps - along with the 3rd Army Corps and 5th Army Corps - were assigned to NATOs Allied Land Forces Southern Europe Command (LANDSOUTH) in Verona. The corps was once more tasked with defending Italy's northern border in South Tyrol. In 1955 the Centauro moved to Novara and joined the III Army Corps and the IV Army Corps added the Carnia-Cadore Troops Command to its units. The Carnia-Cadore Troops Command was a division level command consisting of the Alpine Brigade "Julia" and the Alpine Brigade "Cadore". The Command was tasked with defending the Italian border in the Cadore region and along the Carnic Alps.

In 1972 the Alpine Brigade "Taurinense" joined the IV Army Corps that now commanded all operational Alpini, Alpine, and Mountain units of the Italian Army. On this occasion the corps changed its name to IV Alpine Army Corps. With the Italian Army 1975 reform the Carnia-Cadore Troops Command was disbanded and all five Alpini brigades came under direct command of the IV Alpine Army Corps, which from forthwith was written with Arabic numbers instead of Roman numbers: 4th Alpine Army Corps.

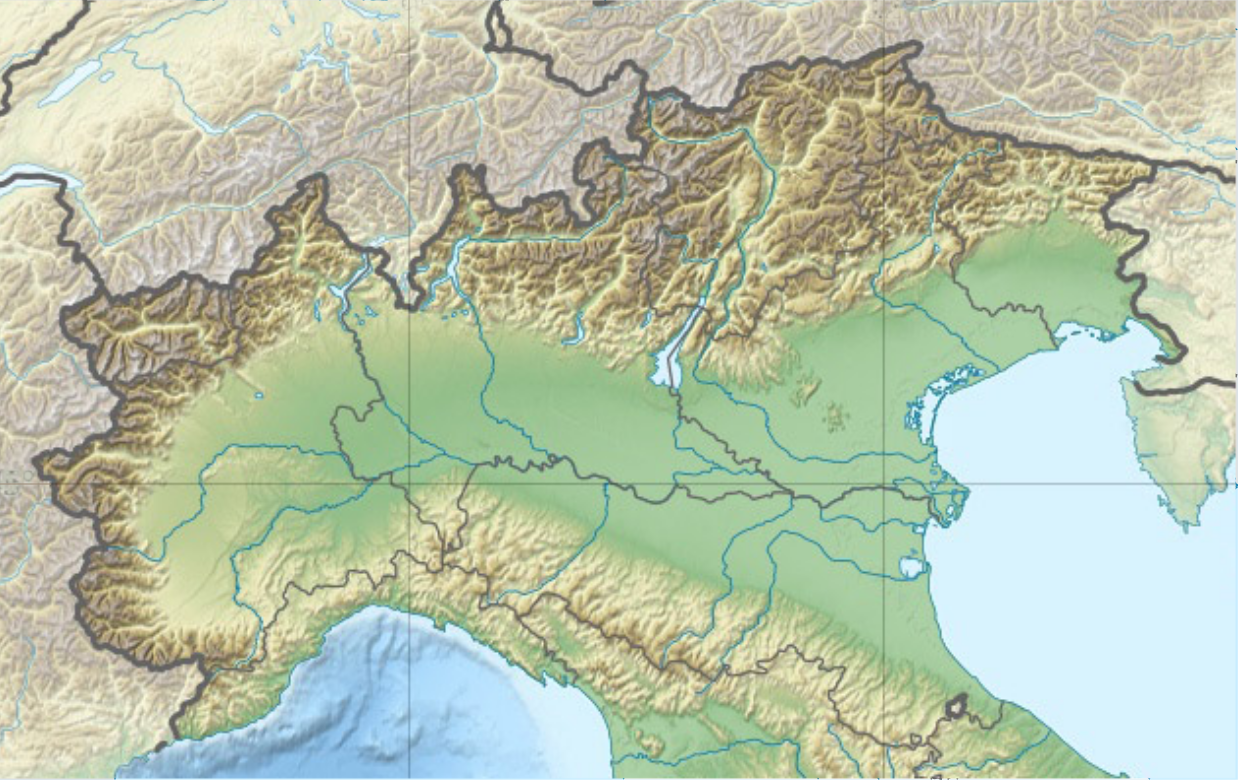
4th Alpine Army Corps brigades in 1986

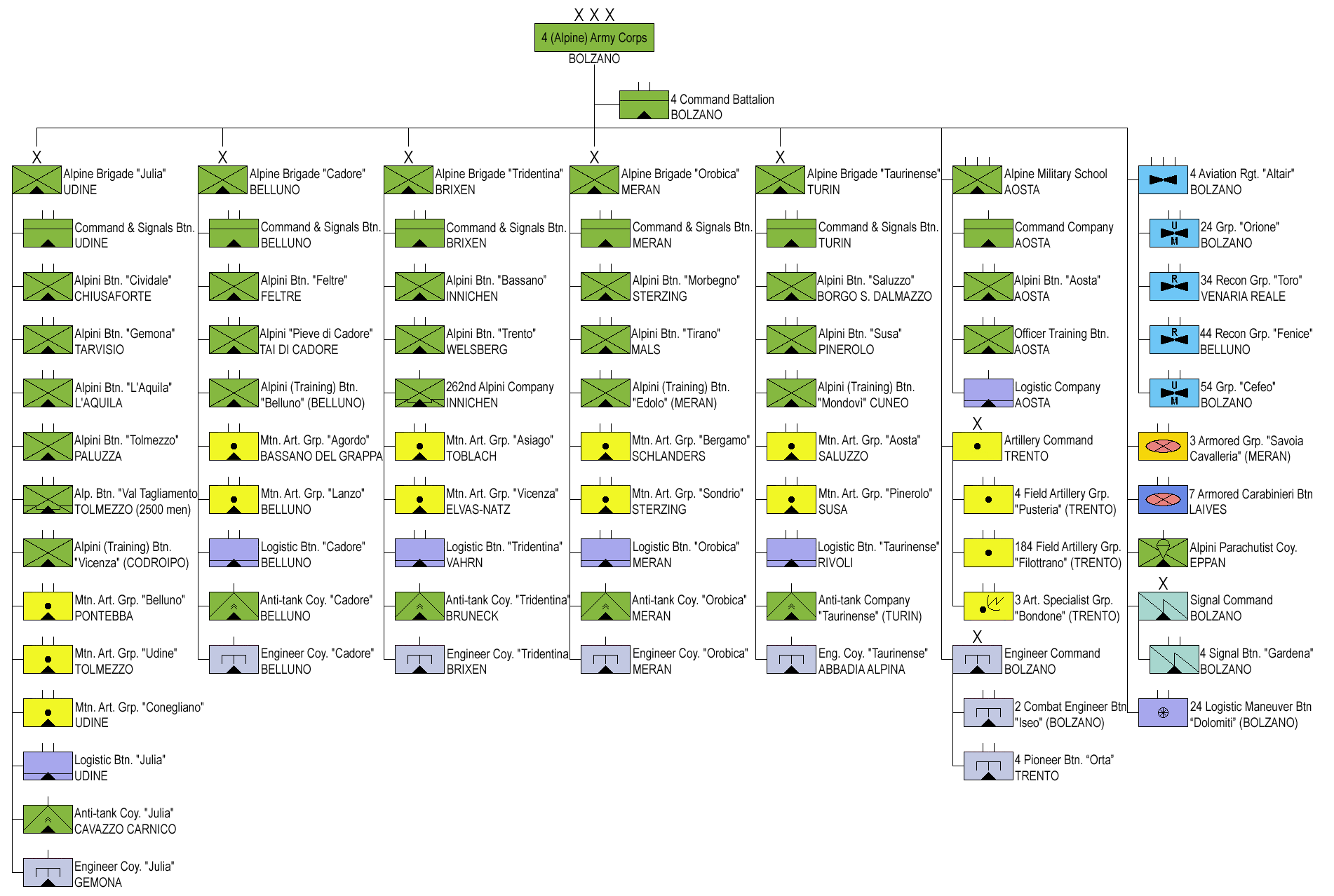
Structure of the 4th Alpine Army Corps in 1986 (click to enlarge)

The structure of the 4th Alpine Army Corps from 1976 to 1986 was as follows:

- 4th Alpine Army Corps Headquarter Battalion, in Bolzano
- Alpine Brigade "Cadore", in Belluno (Veneto)
- Alpine Brigade "Julia", in Udine (Friuli)
- Alpine Brigade "Orobica", in Meran (South Tyrol)
- Alpine Brigade "Taurinense", in Turin (Piedmont)
- Alpine Brigade "Tridentina", in Brixen (South Tyrol)
- 4th Heavy Field Artillery Regiment, in Trento (reduced to 4th Heavy Field Artillery Group "Pusteria" on 31 October 1986)
  - Command and services Battery
  - 1st Heavy Field Artillery Group, (FH-70 howitzer)
  - 2nd Heavy Field Artillery Group, (FH-70 howitzer)
  - 3rd Heavy Field Artillery (Reserve) Group, (FH-70 howitzer)
  - 4th Artillery Specialist Group "Bondone"
- 10th Self-propelled Field Artillery Group "Avisio", in Trento, (M109 howitzer) (Disbanded on 31 October 1986)
- 4th Light Army Aviation Regiment "Altair", at Bolzano-San Giacomo Air Base
  - 24th Light Airplanes and Helicopter Squadrons Group "Orione", at Bolzano-San Giacomo Air Base
  - 34th Reconnaissance Helicopter Squadrons Group "Toro", at Venaria Reale Air Base
  - 44th Reconnaissance Helicopter Squadrons Group "Fenice", at Belluno Air Base
  - 54th Utility Helicopter Squadrons Group "Cefeo", at Pollein Air Base
- 3rd Armored Squadrons Group "Savoia Cavalleria" in Meran, (Leopard 1A2 and M113 APC)
- 7th Armored Carabinieri Battalion "M.O. Petrucelli", in Laives, (M47 Patton and M113 APC)
- 2nd Mining Engineer Battalion "Iseo", in Bolzano
- 4th Engineer Battalion "Orta", in Trento
- 4th Signal Battalion "Gardena", in Bolzano
- 4th Army Corps Auto Group "Claudia", in Eppan (renamed 24th Maneuver Logistic Battalion "Dolomiti" in 1986)
- 7th Alpini Signal Company, in Bassano del Grappa
- Alpini Paratroopers Company "Monte Cervino", in Eppan

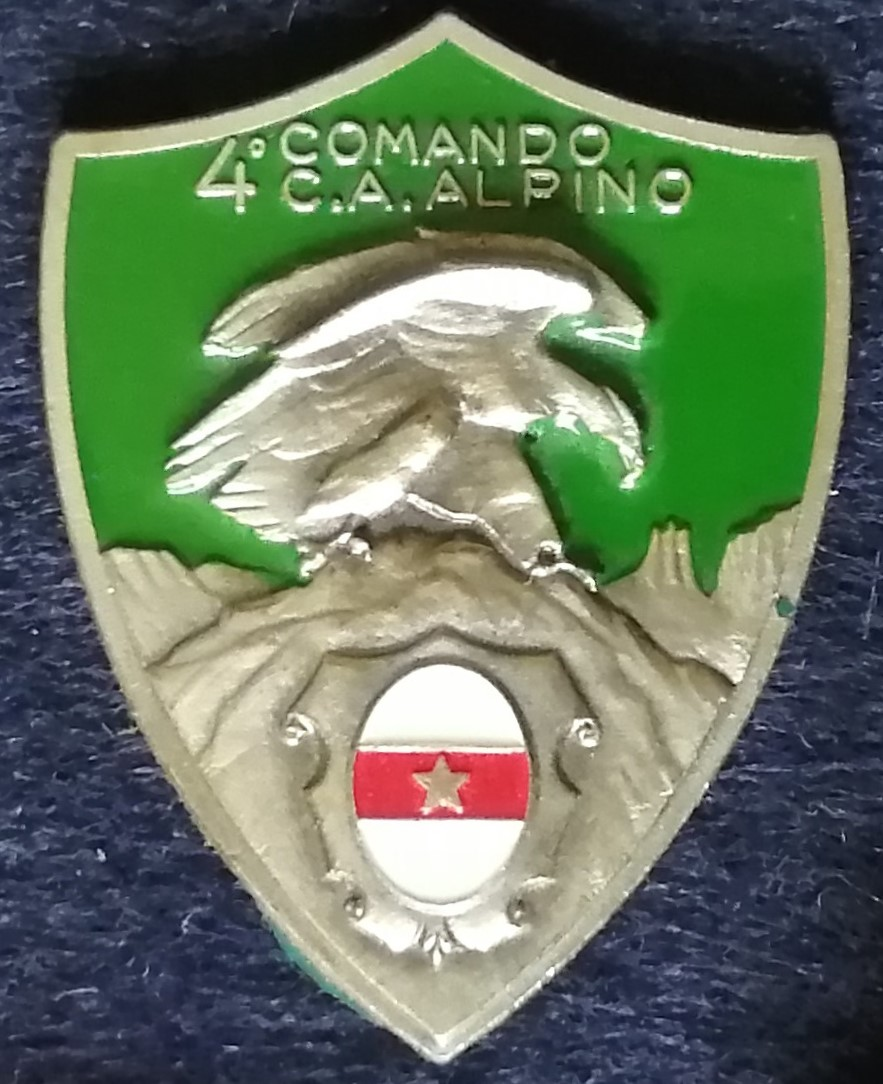
Badge of the 4th Army Corps (IT)

==== Strategic plans in case of war ====
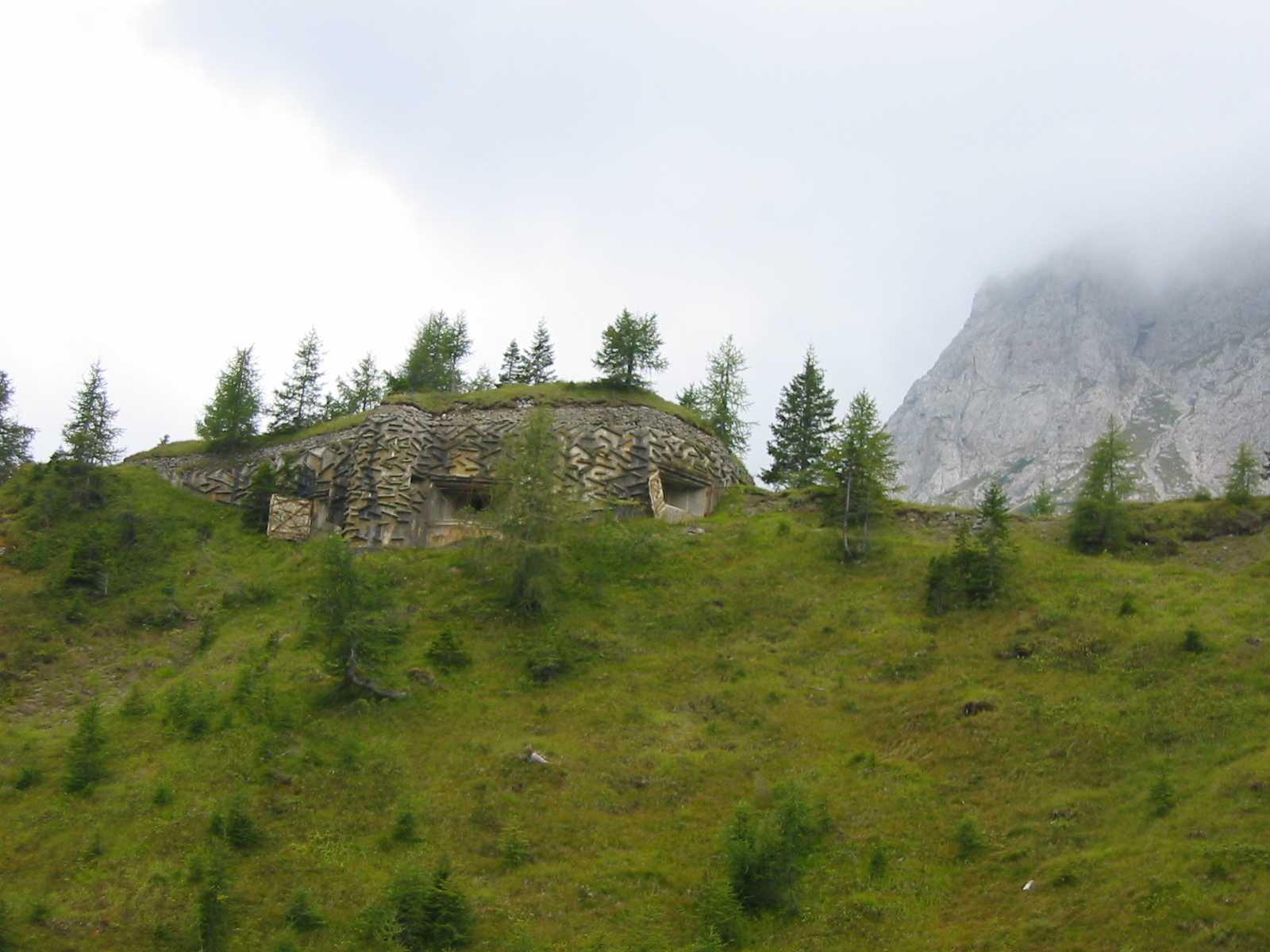
Alpine wall bunker on the Kreuzbergpass

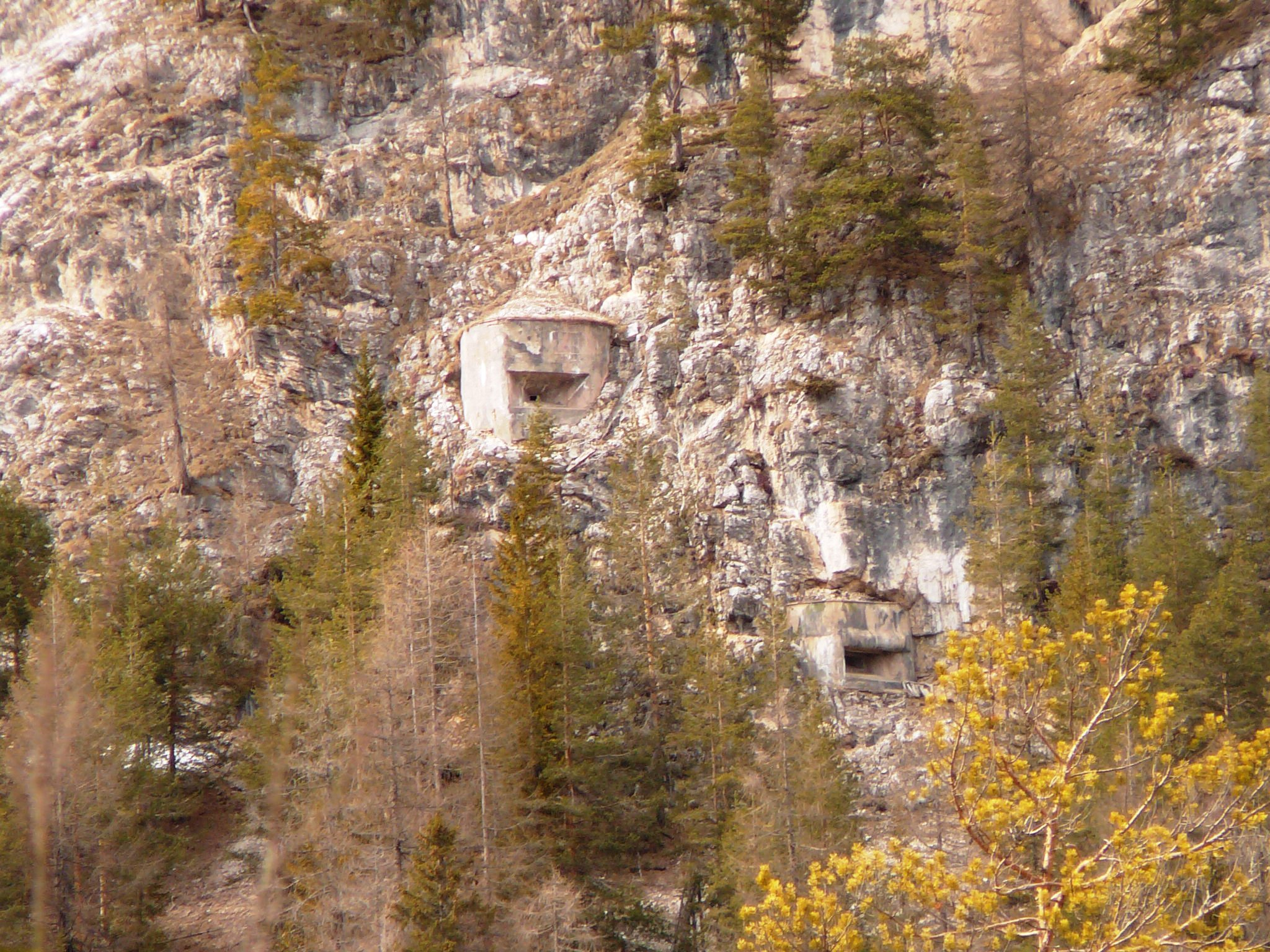
Alpine wall bunker on the Cimabanche Pass

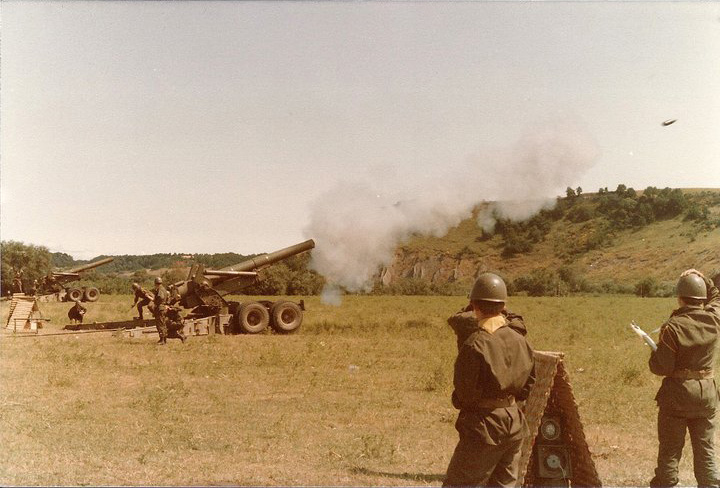
1st Heavy Artillery Group "Adige" firing its M115 howitzers

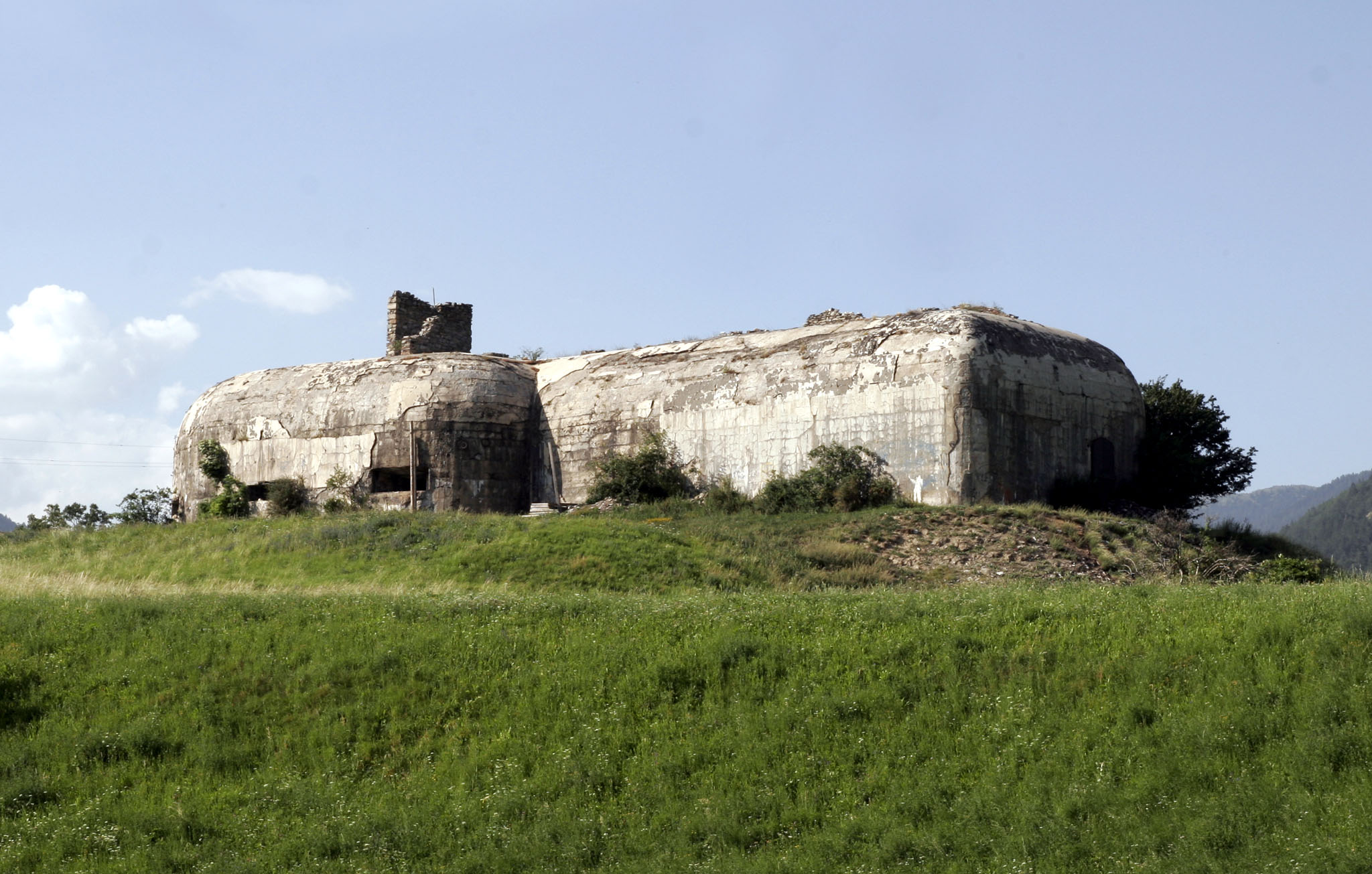
Alpine wall bunker in Mals

After the 1976 reform, the 4th Alpine Army Corps was responsible for defending the Italian border along the main chain of the alps from the Swiss-Austrian-Italian border tripoint in the west to the Italian-Yugoslavian border in the east. In case of war with Yugoslavia, the 4th Alpine Army Corps would remain static in its position guarding the left flank of the Italian V Corps, which would meet the enemy forces on the plains of Friuli-Venezia Giulia. The only brigade which would have seen combat in such a case would have been the Julia.

In case of a war with the Warsaw Pact, the 4th Alpine Army Corps had two war plans: one in the case the Soviet Southern Group of Forces and Hungarian Army would march through Yugoslavia and the other in case the Warsaw Pact would violate Austrian neutrality and march through Austria. In case the enemy forces would come through Yugoslavia, the Julia would cover the mountainous left flank of the 5th Corps, which, with its four armoured and five mechanized brigades, would try to wear down the enemy before it could break out into the North Italian Padan plain. The other Alpini brigades would remain static.

In the more likely case, the Soviet and Hungarian divisions would invade Austria, march through Southern Styria, and through the Drava valley in Carinthia, the Alpini brigades would have been the first front line units of the Italian Army:

- Alpine Brigade "Julia": Coming up the Drava valley the Eastern bloc forces could turn left at Villach and try to cross the Alps through the Canal Valley, which was garrisoned by the units of the Julia: the Alpini battalion "Gemona" was located right at the border in Tarvisio, with the Alpini Battalion "Cividale" further down the valley in Chiusaforte. Both battalions were to be supported by the Mountain Artillery Group "Belluno" in Pontebba. The Gemona was tasked with blocking the Canal Valley right at the border, while the Cividale was tasked with defending the Naßfeld Pass and thus securing the left flank of the Gemona. The biggest battalion of the Italian Army the Alpini Battalion "Val Tagliamento" was based in Tolmezzo shortly before the Southern end of the Canal Valley. The Val Tagliamento fielded 16 full strength companies and had an organic strength of over 2,500 men and was tasked with manning the Alpine Wall bunkers and fortifications in the Canal Valley. The Val Tagliamento was supported by the Mountain Artillery Group "Conegliano" and Mountain Artillery Group "Udine" based in Udine and Tolmezzo. The Alpini Battalion "Tolmezzo" was stationed to the North of Tolmezzo in Paluzza and tasked with defending the Plöcken Pass as a breakthrough there would have allowed enemy forces to march through the But Valley into the rear of the other units of the Julia. An attack through the Canal valley was considered to be the most likely scenario and therefore the Julia was the strongest brigade of the Italian Army with almost 10,000 men.
- Alpine Brigade "Cadore": On the left flank of the Julia the Cadore was tasked with defending the Piave valley. If the Soviet forces would have continued along the Drava Valley they would have reached the Italian border at Winnebach which was defended by the Alpini Battalion "Bassano" of the Tridentina brigade. The Tridentina was tasked to defend the Puster valley, however if Soviet forces would turn south after crossing the border they would have been able to reach the Piave valley through the Sexten valley and over the Kreuzbergpass or through the Höhlensteintal and over the Cimabanche Pass. Therefore, the Alpini Battalion "Pieve di Cadore" was based in Tai di Cadore and tasked with holding the Kreuzbergpass and Cimabanche pass. The Pieve di Cadore was supported by the Mountain Artillery Group "Lanzo" in Belluno. The second battalion of the brigade, the Alpini Battalion "Feltre" in Feltre along with the Mountain Artillery Group "Agordo" in Bassano del Grappa was tasked to cover the many Dolomite mountain passes on the left flank of the Alpini Battalion "Pieve di Cadore". An enemy attack in this sector was considered to be unlikely.
- Alpine Brigade "Tridentina": The Tridentina was tasked with defending the Puster valley at all costs. Connected by a low pass to the Drava valley, the Puster valley ends near Brixen, and a Soviet breakthrough to Brixen would have cut the important line of communication between the Italian Army and NATO's Central Army Group in Southern Germany over the Brenner Pass. Furthermore, from Brixen Soviet forces could turn northwards and take the Central Army Group at its back or they could turn southwards through the Adige valley to reach Verona and take the Italian 5th Corps at its back. Therefore, the Tridentina was the second strongest Alpini brigade. It manned four lines of defence in the Puster valley and the 4th Alpine Army Corps had an armoured and a mechanized battalion, as well as the 4th Heavy Field Artillery Regiment and a self-propelled artillery group in reserve to support the Tridentina. Furthermore, in the village of Elvas near Brixen the 1st Heavy Artillery Group "Adige" was based. The Adige was armed with M115 howitzers and during peacetime part of the 3rd Missile Brigade "Aquileia". In case of war the Adige would have supported the Tridentina with artillery fire, but if a Soviet breakthrough was imminent the Adige would have plastered the Puster Valley from beginning to end with W33 nuclear artillery shells, which were stored in the village of Natz at "Site Rigel" by the 11th US Army Field Artillery Detachment.
- Alpine Brigade "Orobica": The Orobica brigade with its two Alpini battalions and two Mountain Artillery groups was tasked with defending the vital Reschen and Brenner passes. However the true mission of the Orobica was to advance into neutral Austria and link up with the German 23rd Gebirgsjäger Brigade of NATO's Central Army Group in Southern Germany. It was considered vital to establish a line of communication between the Italian Army and the allied armies fighting in Germany. Therefore, the Alpini Battalion "Morbegno" and the Mountain Artillery Group "Sondrio" based in Sterzing would have advanced over the Brenner Pass and through the Wipp valley until Innsbruck, where they would have linked up with German and American forces coming from Mittenwald and through the lower Inn valley, while the Alpini Battalion "Tirano" in Mals along with the Mountain Artillery Group "Bergamo" in Schlanders would have crossed the Reschen pass and advanced until Landeck where they would have linked up with German units coming over the Fern pass. Although Austrian military defence plans envisioned a strong defence around Innsbruck to deny an invading force the use of the many important roads crossing the city, there was a tacit understanding that NATO forces would not be opposed if Warsaw Pact forces had invaded Austria first.
- Alpine Brigade "Taurinense": The Taurinense was to be kept in reserve and deployed as needed: either to reinforce the other Alpine brigades; or to block with the Paratroopers Brigade "Folgore" and Motorized Brigade "Friuli" the Apennine passes into central Italy in case enemy forces would have been able to cross the lower Adige and Po rivers; or to block the French-Italian mountain passes with the French 27th Mountain Infantry Brigade in case the Warsaw Pact would have conquered all of Northern Italy. In case the 5th Army Corps with reinforcement from the 3rd Army Corps would have been able to withstand the Warsaw Pact forces the Taurinense was Italy's designated reinforcement for the Norwegian front.

To aid in the defence of the narrow mountain valleys the 4th Army Corps re-activated the fortifications of the Alpine Wall. To give an idea of the depth of fortifications: the area of operation of the Tridentina the Puster Valley contained 11 lines of defence, with each line consisting of up to 19 bunkers, which were connected underground. The most heavily fortified valley was the Val Canale.

In case the 4th Alpine Army Corps would have failed in its task to hold the Alpine valleys the Italian Army had two further nuclear armed heavy artillery groups stationed near the Alps: the 9th Heavy Artillery Group "Rovigo" in Verona and the 27th Heavy Artillery Group "Marche" in Udine. The Rovigo was armed with M115 howitzers and the 27th group with M110 howitzers, the nuclear shells for the 9th were stored in Longarone at "Site Pluto" and "Site River" and the nuclear shells for the Marche were stored in Reana del Rojale at the Italian Army ammunition depot "San Bernardo". The Rovigo was tasked with denying the enemy the use of the Adige and Piave valleys, while the Marche was ordered to turn the Canal valley into a fiery hell if the Julia would have been overrun. Each of the three groups had two firing batteries with four artillery systems per battery and 140 nuclear artillery shells per group to fulfil their task. In the late 1980s the W33 nuclear artillery shells were replaced with fewer but more powerful W79 nuclear artillery shells.

With the introduction of the second version of the MGM-52 Lance tactical surface-to-surface missile system in the 1980s the three Heavy Artillery Battalions lost their nuclear role. As the Lance had a greater range (130 km vs. 20 km), a higher mobility and better accuracy the Italian Army decided to rely on its stockpile of over 100 missiles rather than on artillery to deny Soviet forces the passage through the Alpine valleys. Therefore, the 1st Heavy Artillery Group "Adige" was disbanded on 31 July 1982 with its 8th battery joining the 9th Heavy Artillery Group "Rovigo" as 3rd Battery "Wolves of Elvas". The Rovigo itself lost its nuclear capability in 1986, and the Marche in 1992.

=== After the Cold War ===
With the end of the Cold War the Italian Army began a decade long reduction of its forces.

The first brigade to disband was the Alpine Brigade "Orobica", which disbanded on 27 July 1991 together with its Alpini battalions Edolo and Morbegno, and its Artillery Group "Bergamo" joining the Alpine Brigade "Tridentina". On the same date the 24th Maneuver Logistic Battalion "Dolomiti" moved from Eppan to Meran, where it incorporated personnel and materiel of the Logistic Battalion "Orobica". On 15 September 1994 the battalion was expanded to regiment and renamed 24th Maneuver Logistic Regiment "Dolomiti".

On 28 August 1992 the 4th Signal Battalion "Gardena" in Bolzano was elevated to 2nd Alpine Signal Regiment and incorporated the 7th Alpini Signal Company in Bassano del Grappa.

The 4th Heavy Field Artillery Group "Pusteria" was disbanded on 4 September 1992 and in its stead the Mountain Artillery Group "Vicenza" of the Tridentina moved to Trento and became the 2nd Alpine Artillery Regiment armed with FH-70 howitzers.

On 13 October 1995 the 2nd Alpini Mining Engineer Battalion "Iseo" moved from Bolzano to Trento, where on the same day the 4th Engineer Battalion "Orta" was disbanded and the Iseo became the only battalion of the reactivated 2nd Alpine Engineer Regiment morphing from a tunnelling to a sapper battalion in the process. Furthermore, in 1995 the Savoia Cavalleria left Meran and moved to Grosseto in Tuscany where it joined the Motorized Brigade "Friuli". Around the same time the 7th Armored Carabinieri Battalion returned to be part of the Carabinieri corps.

The Alpini Paratroopers Company "Monte Cervino" was elevated to battalion on 14 July 1996 and began its conversion from an elite mountain infantry airborne unit to a Ranger-qualified unit, a process which was finished in 1999 when the battalion was renamed as Alpini Paratroopers Battalion "Monte Cervino".

On 10 January 1997 the Alpine Brigade "Cadore" disbanded and its 7th Alpini Regiment and 16th Regiment "Belluno" joined the Alpine Brigade "Julia". In the same year the Alpine Military School in Aosta had been reduced to Alpine Training Center with only the Alpini Battalion "Aosta", which by 1998 consisted only of the 42nd Training Company and the 88th Climbers Company.

On 1 October 1997 the 4th Alpine Army Corps was renamed as the Alpine Troops Command (Comando Truppe Alpine or COMALP). At this point the Command consisted of the following units:

- COMALP Command Unit, in Bolzano
- Alpine Brigade "Julia", in Udine
- Alpine Brigade "Taurinense", in Turin
- Alpine Brigade "Tridentina", in Brixen
- Alpine Training Center, in Aosta
  - Headquarter Company
  - Logistic Company
  - Alpini Battalion "Aosta"
    - Headquarters and Service Company
    - 42nd Alpini Company
    - 88th Climbers Company
- 4th Army Aviation Regiment "Altair", at Bolzano-San Giacomo Air Base
  - 34th Helicopter Group "Toro", at Venaria Reale Air Base
  - 44th Helicopter Group "Fenice", at Belluno Air Base
  - 54th Helicopter Group "Cefeo", at Bolzano-San Giacomo Air Base
- 2nd Alpine Artillery Regiment, in Trento
- 2nd Alpine Signal Regiment, in Bolzano
- 2nd Alpine Engineer Regiment, in Trento
- 24th Maneuver Logistic Regiment "Dolomiti", in Meran
- Alpini Paratroopers Battalion "Monte Cervino", in Bolzano

On 1 December 1997 the 2nd Alpine Artillery Regiment passed from the COMALP to the Army's new Artillery Brigade. On 1 March 1998 the 16th Regiment "Belluno" of the Julia and the 18th Regiment "Edolo" of the Tridentina passed to the 4th Alpine Army Corps. Both regiments were disbanded after Italy suspend compulsory military service in 2001; the 18th on 30 September 2004 and the 16th on 30 November 2004.

In February 2000 the 2nd Alpine Signal Regiment was transferred to the newly raised Signal Brigade. In February 2001 the 24th Maneuver Logistic Regiment "Dolomiti" added a field maintenance and a field medical battalion to its ranks and transferred to the newly formed Logistic Brigade. In July 2001 the 4th Army Aviation Regiment "Altair" passed to the newly raised Army Aviation Brigade. In 2002 the 2nd Alpine Engineer Regiment was transferred to the Julia. As the Alpini Paratroopers Battalion "Monte Cervino was deployed constantly in the war in Afghanistan since 2002 the battalion added a third Ranger company in 2004 and was therefore elevated to 4th Alpini Paratroopers Regiment on 25 September 2004.

The last brigade to disband was the Alpine Brigade "Tridentina", which lowered its flag for the last time on 31 December 2002. However, on the next day the Division Command "Tridentina" was activated in Bolzano as a deployable division command. The division command carries on the traditions of the 2nd Alpine Division "Tridentina" and the Alpine Brigade "Tridentina".

=== Today ===
COMTA units locations 2017

Today the Command is located in the northern Italian City of Bolzano and consists of the following units:

- Division "Tridentina" in Bolzano
  - Command and Tactical Supports Unit "Tridentina" in Bolzano
- Alpine Brigade "Taurinense" in Turin (Piedmont)
- Alpine Brigade "Julia" in Udine (Friuli)
- Alpine Training Center in Aosta (Aosta)
  - Training Regiment in Aosta
  - 6th Alpini Regiment in Bruneck (South Tyrol)

For operational needs the COMTA can draw troops from the following support units located in the same region as the Command itself:

- 2nd Alpine Signal Regiment in Bolzano
- 4th Army Aviation Regiment "Altair" in Bolzano
- 7th Carabinieri Regiment "Trentino-Alto Adige" in Laives

In 2013 the COMTA's 4th Alpini Parachutist Regiment Monte Cervino was transferred to the Army Special Forces Command (COMFOSE).

The Alpine Commands main duty was the organization, preparation and conduction of Italy's contribution to the International Security Assistance Force (ISAF) in Afghanistan. Since the beginning of the ongoing war in Afghanistan the Alpine commands had provided and commanded at all times at least one of the two Italian battlegroups in the theater of operation.

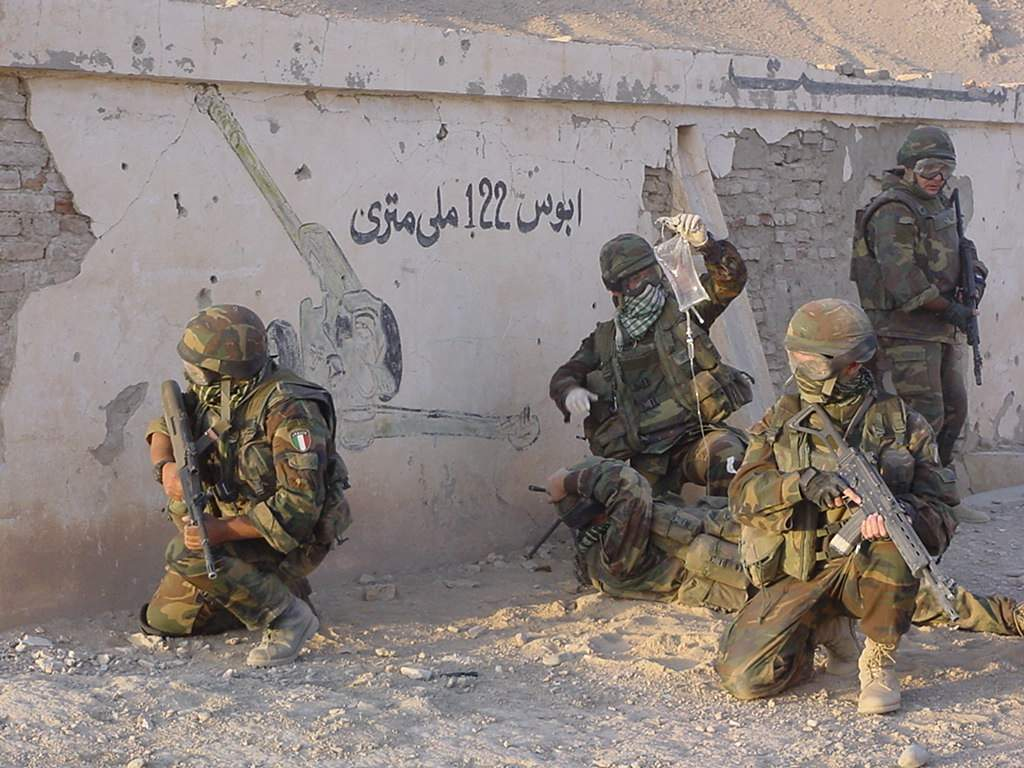
Alpini from the 4th Alpini regiment in Afghanistan

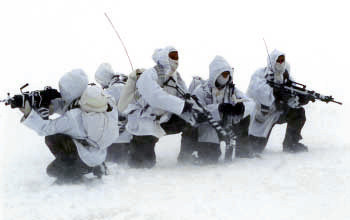
Alpini from the Taurinense Brigade
