= Logistic Battalion "Orobica" =

Inactive Italian Army mountain logistics unit

- Battaglione Logistico "Orobica"
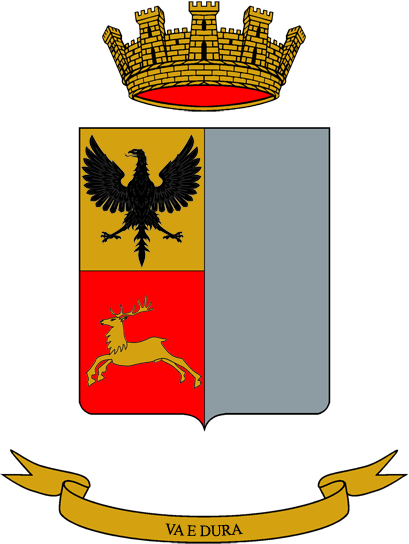
- Battalion coat of arms
- Active: 1 May 1976 – 27 July 1991
- Country: Italy
- Branch: Italian Army
- Type: Military logistics
- Part of: Alpine Brigade "Orobica"
- Garrison/HQ: Meran
- Motto(s): "Va e dura"
- Anniversaries: 22 May 1916 – Battle of Asiago

Insignia
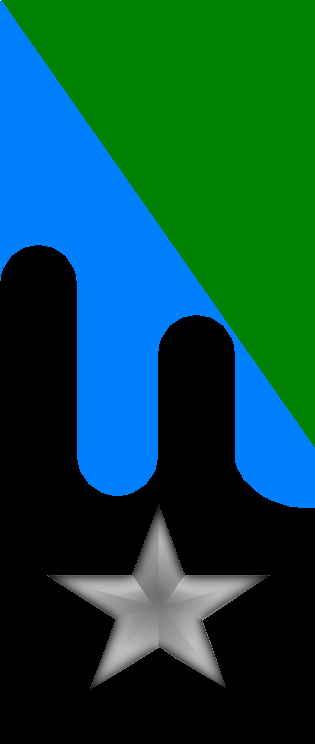
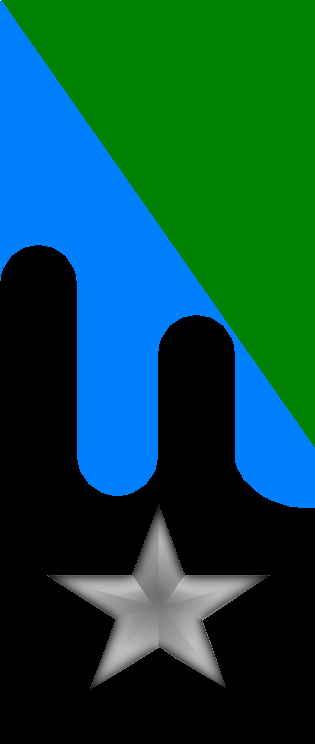
- Unit gorget patches

The Logistic Battalion "Orobica" (Italian: Battaglione Logistico "Orobica") is an inactive military logistics battalion of the Italian Army, which was assigned to the Alpine Brigade "Orobica". As an alpine unit the battalion is associated with the army's mountain infantry speciality, the Alpini, with whom the battalion shares the distinctive Cappello Alpino. The battalion's anniversary falls, as for all units of the Italian Army's Transport and Materiel Corps, on 22 May, the anniversary of the Royal Italian Army's first major use of automobiles to transport reinforcements to the Asiago plateau to counter the Austro-Hungarian Asiago Offensive in May 1916.

== History ==
=== Cold War ===
The battalion is the spiritual successor of the logistic units of the Alpine Brigade "Orobica", which was formed on 1 November 1956 in Meran. On the same date the logistic units of the brigade were formed and assigned to the newly created Service Units Command "Orobica". The command consisted of a medical section, a provisions section, a mobile vehicle park, a mobile workshop, and an auto unit. On 1 January 1962, the mobile vehicle park and mobile workshop merged to form the Resupply, Repairs, Recovery Unit "Orobica".

On 1 January 1967, the Service Units Command "Orobica" was reorganized as Services Grouping Command "Orobica", which consisted of a command, the Auto Unit "Orobica", a provisions company, the Resupply, Repairs, Recovery Unit "Orobica", and the reserve Medical Battalion "Orobica", which in turn consisted of the 42nd Field Hospital and a medical section.

On 1 May 1976, as part of the 1975 army reform, the Services Grouping Command "Orobica" was reorganized as Logistic Battalion "Orobica". Initially the battalion consisted of a command, a command and services platoon, two light logistic units, a medium logistic unit, and two reserve medical units. At the time the battalion fielded 712 men (42 officers, 92 non-commissioned officers, and 588 soldiers).

On 12 November 1976, the President of the Italian Republic Giovanni Leone granted with decree 846 the battalion a flag.

In October 1980, the two medical units merged into a single reserve medical unit. On 1 November 1981, the battalion was reorganized and consisted afterwards of the following units:

- Logistic Battalion "Orobica", in Meran
  - Command and Services Company
  - Supply Company
  - Maintenance Company
  - Medium Transport Company
  - Medical Unit (Reserve)

=== Recent times ===
After the end of the Cold War the Italian Army began to draw down its forces. Consequently, on 12 July the battalion's flag was transferred to the Shrine of the Flags in the Vittoriano in Rome for safekeeping. On 27 July 1991, the Alpine Brigade "Orobica" and the Logistic Battalion "Orobica" were disbanded. One the same date the battalion's personnel and materiel were incorporated into the 24th Maneuver Logistic Battalion "Dolomiti", which had moved from Bolzano to Meran on 11 July 1991.

== See also ==
- Military logistics
