= Battle of Nikolayevka =

1943 Italian breakout on the Eastern Front

- Part of the Eastern Front of World War II
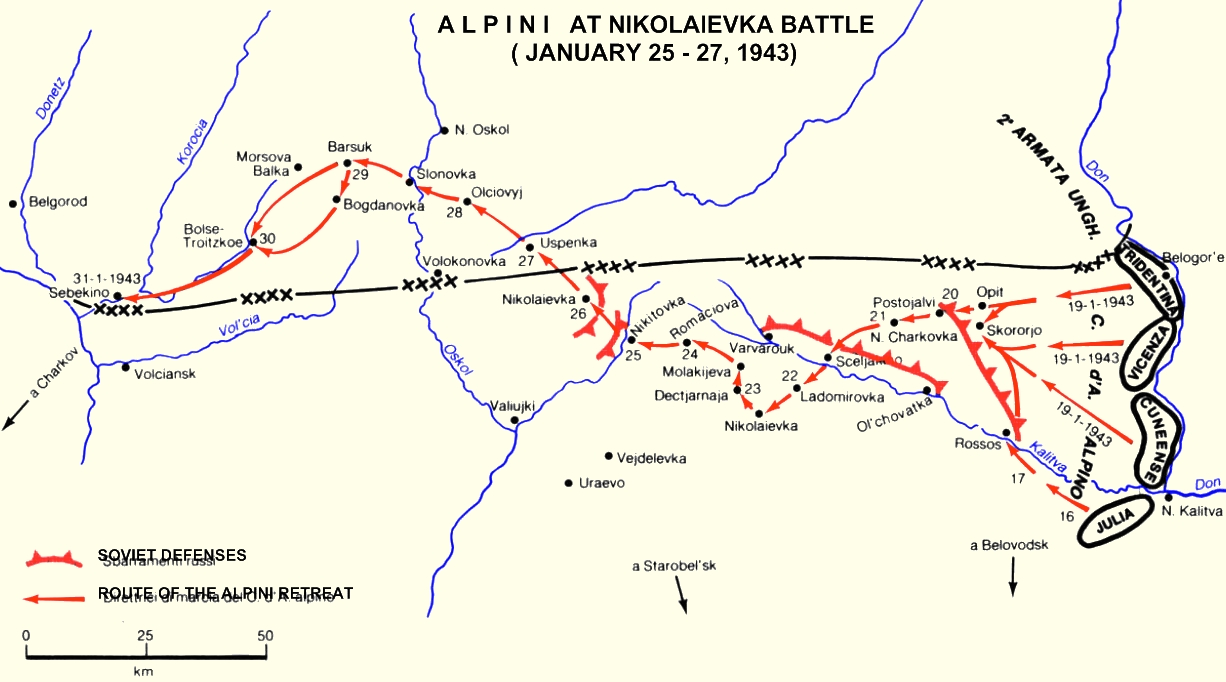
- Alpini route toward Nikolaievka, from the Don river
Date	January 26, 1943
Location	Nikolayevka, Belgorod Oblast, Russian SFSR, Soviet Union
Result	Axis victory

Belligerents
Italy; Germany; Hungary	Soviet Union

Commanders and leaders
Giulio Martinat †; Luigi Reverberi	Nikolai Makovchuk

Strength
8,000-9000 troops of the Tridentina Alpine division	6,000 infantry (plus Soviet partisans)

Casualties and losses
3,000 killed, wounded and captured	2,000 dead and wounded

The Battle of Nikolayevka occurred on 26 January 1943 when the Tridentina division (part of the Alpine corps, within the Italian 8th Army) broke out of the Soviet encirclement, near the village of Nikolayevka (now Livenka, Belgorod Oblast, in Russia). This allowed the Italian survivors of the Ostrogozhsk–Rossosh offensive, which had caused huge losses to the Alpini, to complete their retreat to safety.

== Prelude ==
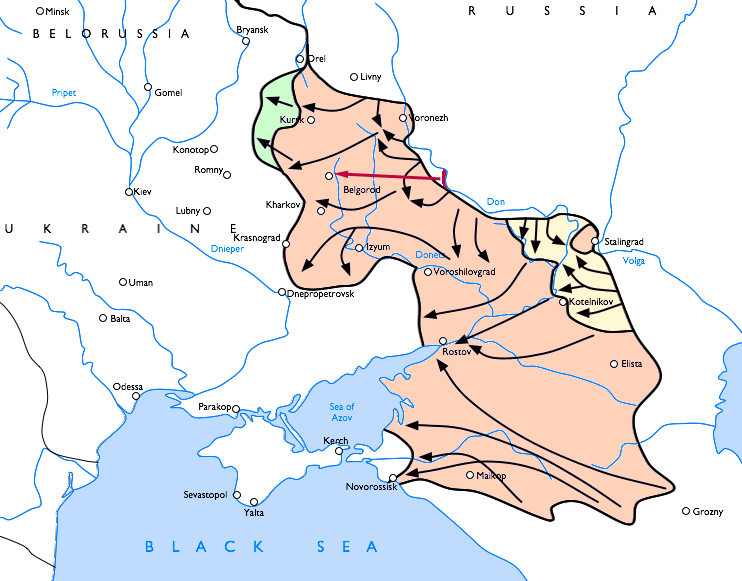
The Alpini positions on the river Don before the Soviet advances during operations Uranus, Mars and Saturn and their line of retreat in red.

On December 16, 1942, Soviet forces launched Operation Little Saturn aimed at the Italian 8th Army. The Soviet plan was to ford the River Don, encircle and destroy the Italian 8th Army along the Don, then push towards Rostov-on-Don and thus cut off Army Group A fighting in the Caucasus. On December 16 General Vasily Kuznetsov's 1st Guards Army and General Dmitri Lelyushenko's 3rd Guards Army attacked the units of the Italian 8th Army, which were quickly destroyed—in three days the Red Army had opened a gap in the Axis front 45 km (28 mi) deep and 150 km (93 mi) wide and destroyed two of the Italian Army's Corps (2nd and 35th). The Soviet armored columns now rapidly advanced south towards the Black Sea.

== The breakout ==
The Italian Alpine Army Corps (it:Corpo d'armata alpino), consisting of the 2nd Alpine Division "Tridentina", 3rd Alpine Division "Julia", 4th Alpine Division "Cuneense", and 156th Infantry Division "Vicenza" to their rear, were at this point largely unaffected by the Soviet offensive on their right flank. On January 13, 1943, the Red Army launched the second stage of Operation Saturn. Four armies of General Filipp Golikov's Voronezh Front attacked, encircled, and destroyed the Hungarian Second Army near Svoboda on the Don to the northwest of the Italians and pushed back the remaining units of the German XXIV Army Corps on the Alpini left flank, thus encircling the Alpine Army Corps.

On the evening of January 17, the Alpine Army Corps commander, General Gabriele Nasci, ordered a full retreat. At this point only the Tridentina division was still capable of conducting effective combat operations. The 40,000-strong mass of stragglers—Alpini and Italians from other commands, plus German and Hungarian Hussars (Light Cavalry)—formed two columns that followed the Tridentina division which, supported by a handful of German armoured vehicles, led the way westwards to the Axis lines.

On the morning of January 26, the spearheads of the Tridentina reached the hamlet of Nikolayevka, occupied by the 48th Guards Rifle Division. The Soviets had fortified the railway embankment on both sides of the village. General Nasci ordered a frontal assault and at 9:30 am the 6th Alpini Regiment with the battalions "Verona", "Val Chiese", and "Vestone", the Tridentina division's II Mixed Engineer Battalion, the Mountain Artillery Group "Bergamo" of the 2nd Mountain Artillery Regiment, and three German Sturmgeschütz III commenced the attack. By noon the Italian forces had reached the outskirts of the village and the Alpine Corps' Chief of Staff General Giulio Martinat brought up reinforcements: the 5th Alpini Regiment with the battalions "Edolo", "Morbegno" and "Tirano", and the remaining mountain artillery groups "Vicenza" and "Valcamonica" of the 2nd Mountain Artillery Regiment, as well as the remnants of the Alpini Battalion "L’Aquila" of the "Julia" division. General Martinat fell during this assault.

By sunset the Alpini battalions were still struggling to break the reinforced Soviet lines and in a last effort to decide the battle before nightfall General Luigi Reverberi, commander of the Tridentina division, ordered the remaining troops and stragglers, which had arrived over the course of the afternoon, to assault the Soviet positions in a human wave attack. The assault managed to break open the Soviet lines and the Italian survivors managed to continue their retreat, which was no longer contested by Soviet forces.

== Aftermath ==
On February 1 the remnants of the Corps reached Axis lines. The Italians suffered heavy losses over the course of the retreat: the Cuneense division had been destroyed; one tenth of the Division Julia survived (approximately 1,200 of 15,000 troops deployed) and one third of the Division Tridentina survived (approximately 4,250 of 15,000 troops deployed). The "Vicenza" Division counted 10,466 men at the beginning of the Soviet offensive, 7,760 of which had been killed or were missing after the division's remnants reached Axis lines. In total the corps suffered 34,170 killed in action and 9,400 wounded in action out of 57,000 men at the beginning of the retreat.

The battle of Nikolayevka has become an important point of reference for the Alpini and their fighting spirit. The Alpini Association also supports social programs in the city.

== See also ==
- Italian Army in Russia
- Italian participation in the Eastern Front

== Bibliography ==
- David Glantz and Jonathan House, The Stalingrad Trilogy: Vol. 3. Endgame at Stalingrad: Book 2: December 1942 - February 194, University Press of Kansas, 2014. ISBN 978-0-7006-1954-2.
- Hamilton, H. Sacrifice on the Steppe. Casemate, 2011 (English)
- The Italian War on the Eastern Front, 1941–1943: Operations, Myths and Memories by Bastian Matteo Scianna (2019).
- Eugenio Corti (1997). Few Returned: Twenty-Eight Days on the Russian Front, Winter 1942-1943: Diary of Twenty-eight Days on the Russian Front, Winter, 1942-43. University of Missouri Press. ISBN 9780826211156.
