= 5th Alpini Regiment =

Active Italian Army mountain infantry unit

- 5° Reggimento Alpini
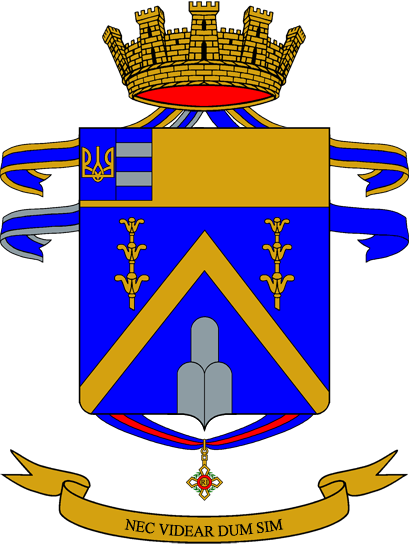
- Regimental coat of arms
- Active: 1 Nov. 1882 – 10 Sept. 1943; 1 Jan. 1953 – today
- Country: Italy
- Branch: Italian Army
- Type: Mountain Infantry
- Part of: Alpine Brigade "Julia"
- Garrison/HQ: Sterzing
- Motto: "Nec videar dum sim"
- Anniversaries: 8 June 1916
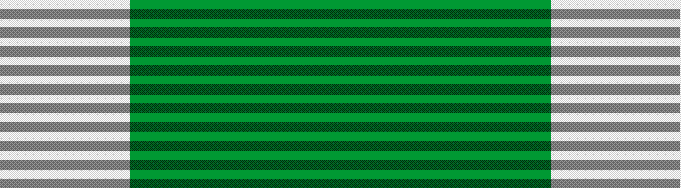
- Decorations: 1× Military Order of Italy; 2× Gold Medals of Military Valor; 1× Silver Medal of Military Valor; 1× Bronze Medal of Military Valor; 1× Silver Medal of Merit

Insignia
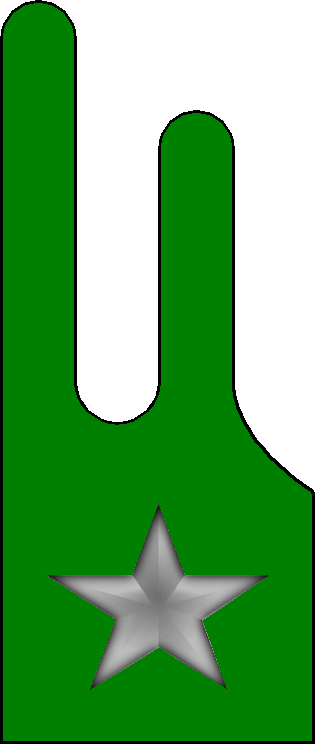
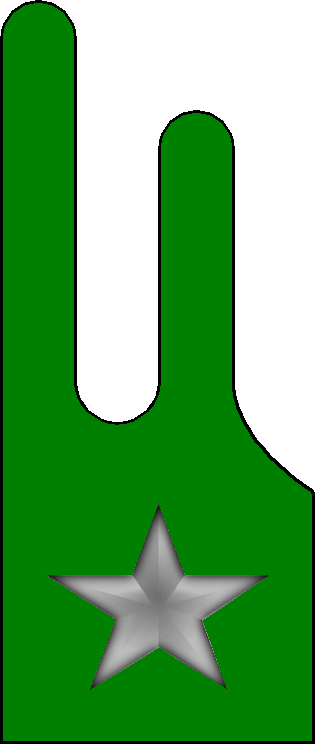
- Alpini gorget patches

The 5th Alpini Regiment (Italian: 5° Reggimento Alpini) is a mountain warfare regiment of the Italian Army based in Sterzing in South Tyrol. The regiment belongs to the Italian Army's Alpini infantry speciality and is assigned to the Alpine Brigade "Julia". On 1 November 1882, the Royal Italian Army formed the 5th Alpini Regiment, which had its recruiting area in the valleys of Northern Lombardy, which lie mostly within the Lepontine Alps, Bergamasque Alps and Livigno Alps. The recruiting area of the 5th Alpini Regiment extended to the Westerns shore of Lake Garda, with the recruiting area of the 6th Alpini Regiment commencing on the Eastern shore.

During World War I the regiment expanded to 16 battalions and became the largest regiment ever fielded by the Italian Army. During the war the regiment's battalions fought separately in the alpine areas of the Italian front. In 1935 the regiment was assigned to the 2nd Alpine Division "Tridentina", with which it served during World War II in the invasion of France and the Greco-Italian War. For its service and sacrifice on the Greek Front the 5th Alpini Regiment was awarded Italy's highest military honor the Gold Medal of Military Valor. In summer 1942 the 2nd Alpine Division "Tridentina" was transferred to the Eastern Front in the Soviet Union, where it was destroyed in winter 1942–43 during the Soviet Operation Little Saturn. The remnants of the division were repatriated in spring 1943. For its service and sacrifice on the Greek Front and then on the Eastern Front the 5th Alpini Regiment was twice awarded a second Gold Medal of Military Valor. On 8 September 1943, the Armistice of Cassibile was announced and two days later, on 10 September 1943, invading German forces disbanded the 5th Alpini Regiment.

On 1 January 1953, the 5th Alpini Regiment was reformed and assigned to the Alpine Brigade "Orobica". In 1975 the regiment was disbanded and its flag and traditions assigned to the Alpini Battalion "Morbegno". In 1991 the Alpine Brigade "Orobica" was disbanded and the Alpini Battalion "Morbegno" was assigned to the Alpine Brigade "Tridentina". The regiment was reformed in 1992. On 31 December 2002, the Alpine Brigade "Tridentina" was disbanded and the next day the 5th Alpini Regiment was assigned to the Alpine Brigade "Julia". The regiment's anniversary falls on 8 June 1916, the height of the Battle of Asiago, during which the regiment's Alpini Battalion "Morbegno" earned a Silver Medal of Military Valor for holding Monte Fior and Monte Castelgomberto with other Alpini battalions.

== History ==
On 15 October 1872, the Royal Italian Army formed 15 locally recruited Alpini companies in the alpine regions of Northern Italy. Nine more companies were formed the following year. In 1875 the 24 companies were organized into seven battalions, and in 1878 the companies were increased to 36 and the battalions to ten. On 1 November 1882, the Alpini companies were increased to 72 and grouped into 20 battalions. On the same date the battalions were assigned to six newly formed Alpini regiments, which were numbered 1st to 6th from West to East, while companies were numbered from 1 to 72 from to West to East. Upon entering the regiments, the battalions, which until then had been designated by a Roman numeral, were named for their recruiting zone, while the Alpini companies were renumbered sequentially from 1st to 72nd. One of the six Alpini regiments formed on 1 November 1882 was the 5th Alpini Regiment, which was formed in Milan in Lombardy. The new regiment received the battalions "Val Dora" and "Moncenisio", which both recruited in the Susa Valley, through which the Dora Riparia river flows and which lies beneath the Moncenisio massif; as well as the battalions "Valtellina" and "Alta Valtellina", which both recruited in the Valtellina Valley.

- 5th Alpini Regiment, in Milan
  - Battalion "Val Dora", in Susa
    - 32nd, 33rd, and 34th Company
  - Battalion "Moncenisio", in Susa
    - 35th, 36th, and 37th Company
  - Battalion "Valtellina", in Morbegno
    - 44th, 45th, 46th, and 47th Company
  - Battalion "Alta Valtellina", in Tirano
    - 48th, 49th, 50th, and 51st Company

On 1 April 1885, the regiment transferred the battalions "Val Dora" and "Moncenisio" to the 3rd Alpini Regiment, and received from the 1st Alpini Regiment the Battalion "Val Camonica", which recruited in the Camonica Valley. On 1 November 1886, the battalions changed their names from their recruiting zones to the cities and towns, where their base was located. At the same time Alpini soldiers and non-commissioned officers were issued thread tufts, called Nappina in Italian, which were clipped to the Cappello Alpino headdress, and colored white for the troops of a regiment's first battalion, red for the troops of a regiment's second battalion, green for the troops of a regiment's third battalion, and blue for the troops of a regiment's fourth battalion. The same year the 5th Alpini Regiment formed the Alpini Battalion "Rocca d’Anfo" with companies split off from the Alpini Battalion "Edolo" and then consisted of the following units:

- 5th Alpini Regiment, in Milan
  - Alpini Battalion "Morbegno", in Morbegno (former Battalion "Valtellina")
    - 44th, 45th, and 47th Alpini Company
  - Alpini Battalion "Tirano", in Tirano (former Battalion "Alta Valtellina")
    - 46th, 48th, and 49th Alpini Company
  - Alpini Battalion "Edolo", in Edolo (former Battalion "Val Camonica")
    - 50th, 51st, and 52nd Alpini Company
  - Alpini Battalion "Rocca d'Anfo", in Rocca d'Anfo
    - 53rd, 54th, and 55th Alpini Company

In 1887–88 the regiment's 48th Alpini Company deployed to Massawa for the Italo-Ethiopian War of 1887–1889, which led to the establishment of the Italian colony of Eritrea. In 1889 the Alpini Battalion "Rocca d’Anfo" moved to Vestone and therefore changed its name Alpini Battalion "Vestone". In 1895–96 the regiment provided 25 officers and 641 troops to help form the I and IV provisional Alpini battalions, which were deployed to Eritrea for the First Italo-Ethiopian War. In 1901 the regiment was assigned together with the 3rd Alpini Regiment and 4th Alpini Regiment to the II Alpini Group, which on 9 August 1910 was renamed II Alpine Brigade. In December 1908 the regiment was deployed to the area of the Strait of Messina for the recovery efforts after the 1908 Messina earthquake. For its service the regiment was awarded a Silver Medal of Merit, which was affixed to the regiment's flag.

=== Italo-Turkish War ===
On 29 September 1911 the Kingdom of Italy declared war against the Ottoman Empire and the Alpini Battalion "Edolo" was deployed to Libya for the Italo-Turkish War. On 11–12 February 1912, a platoon of the battalion's 51st Company distinguished itself during the defense of the Italian position designated Ridotta Lombardia near Derna, which was held in hand-to-hand combat against Bedouin forces. On 8–10 October 1912, the battalion distinguished itself in the Battle of Bu Msafer near Derna. The same month the Alpini Battalion "Vestone" was assigned to the 8th Special Regiment, which had been formed in Libya with the command of the 8th Alpini Regiment and was led by Colonel Antonio Cantore. On 23 March 1913, the 8th Special Regiment fought in the Battle of Assaba against local rebel forces. During the war the 5th Alpini Regiment also provided 4 officers and 276 troops to augment other units fighting in the war.

For its conduct at Ridotta Lombardia and in the Battle of Bu Msafer the Alpini Battalion "Edolo", was awarded a Silver Medal of Military Valor, while the Alpini Battalion "Vestone" was awarded a Bronze Medal of Military Valor for its conduct in the Battle of Assaba. Both medals were affixed to the flag of the 5th Alpini Regiment and added to the regiment's coat of arms.

=== World War I ===
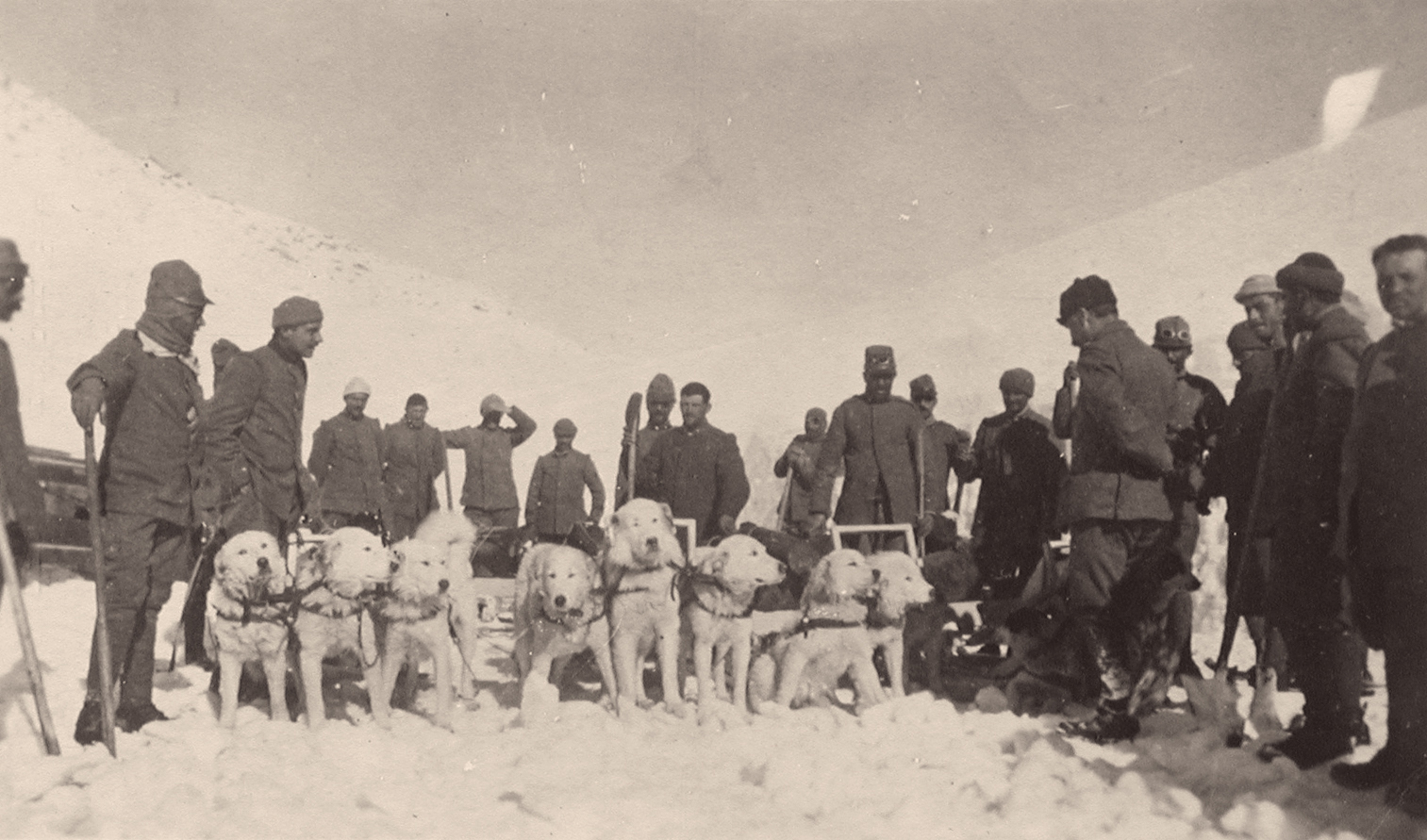
Italian soldiers with their dog sleds on the Adamello glacier

At the outbreak of World War I the Alpini speciality consisted of eight regiments, which fielded 26 battalions with 79 companies. Each Alpini battalion, with the exception of the Alpini Battalion "Verona", fielded three Alpini companies, while the Alpini Battalion "Verona" fielded four companies. Each company consisted of one captain, four lieutenants and 250 other ranks. After Italy's initial declaration of neutrality 38 additional Alpini companies were formed during the autumn of 1914 with men, who had completed their military service in the preceding four years. These companies were numbered from 80th to 117th and assigned to the existing Alpini battalions. During the same year the regimental command of the 5th Alpini Regiment moved from Milan to Edolo. In January 1915, each Alpini battalion formed a reserve battalion, with men, who had completed their military service at least four years, but not more than eleven years prior. These reserve battalions were named for a valley (Italian: Valle; abbreviated Val) located near their associated regular Alpini battalion's base, and the reserve battalions received the same Nappina as their associated regular Alpini battalion. The companies of the Valle battalions were numbered from 201st to 281st, with the numbers 227th, 233rd, 237th, 271st, and 273rd unused.

In spring 1915, the depot in Morbegno formed the 1st Alpini Volunteers Company, while in Milan volunteers formed the 2nd Alpini Volunteers Company, and the depot in Edolo formed the 3rd Alpini Volunteers Company "Val Camonica". In Brescia volunteers formed another Volunteer Unit, which after training at the depot in Vestone, was designated Volunteer Unit "Vestone". On 23 May 1915, Italy declared war on Austria-Hungary and at the time the 5th Alpini Regiment consisted of the following units:

- 5th Alpini Regiment, in Edolo
  - Alpini Battalion "Morbegno"
    - 44th, 45th, 47th, 88th, and 104th Alpini Company
  - Alpini Battalion "Tirano"
    - 46th, 48th, 49th, 89th, and 113th Alpini Company
  - Alpini Battalion "Edolo"
    - 50th, 51st, 52nd, 90th, and 105th Alpini Company
  - Alpini Battalion "Vestone"
    - 53rd, 54th, 55th, and 91st Alpini Company
  - Alpini Battalion "Val d'Intelvi"
    - 244th, 245th, and 247th Alpini Company
  - Alpini Battalion "Valtellina"
    - 246th, 248th, and 249th Alpini Company
  - Alpini Battalion "Val Camonica"
    - 250th, 251st, and 252nd Alpini Company
  - Alpini Battalion "Val Chiese"
    - 253rd, 254th, and 255th Alpini Company

By the end of 1915 the Alpini regiments began to form additional companies with recruits born in 1896. These new companies were numbered from 118th to 157th and were used, together with the 38 companies formed earlier, to form an additional reserve battalion for each regular battalion. These new battalions were named for a mountain (Italian: Monte) located near their associated regular Alpini battalion's base, and the reserve battalions received the same Nappina as their associated regular Alpini battalion. The 5th Alpini Regiment thus added the following Monte battalions:

- Alpini Battalion "Monte Spluga"
  - 88th, 104th, and 136th Alpini Company
- Alpini Battalion "Monte Stelvio"
  - 89th, 113th, and 137th Alpini Company
- Alpini Battalion "Monte Adamello"
  - 90th, 105th, and 138th Alpini Company
- Alpini Battalion "Monte Suello"
  - 91st, 139th, and 140th Alpini Company

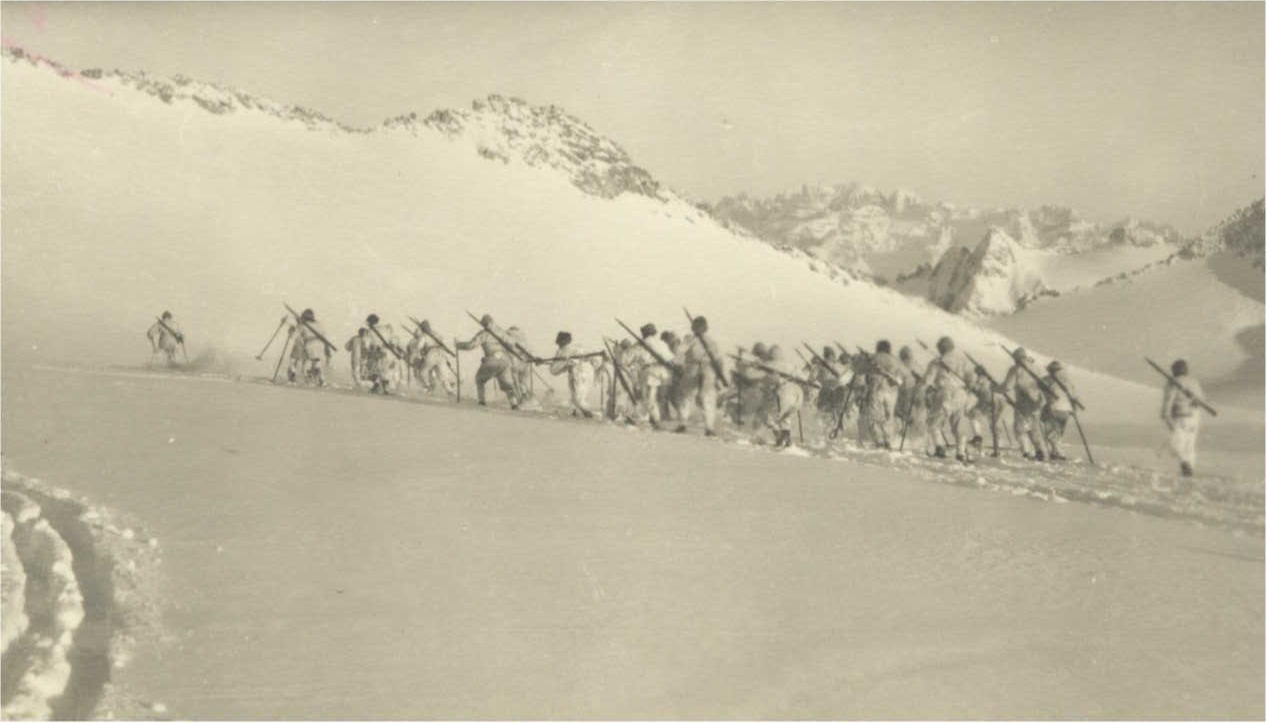
Italian Alpini patrol on the Adamello glacier

In October 1915, the 1st and 2nd Alpini volunteers companies were merged and formed the 1st Volunteer Unit, which fought on the glaciers of the Ortler group. At the beginning of the war the 5th Alpini Regiment had formed the Autonomous Company "Garibaldi" with experienced skiers and climbers. In summer 1915, the company, which consisted of approximately 300 men, was based at the mountain hut "Garibaldi" in the Adamello group and tasked with defending the high altitude mountain passes on the glaciers of the Adamello group. By the end of 1915 the company had grown to almost 600 men. On 20 April 1916, the company was reorganized as the Autonomous Battalion "Garibaldi". The battalion consisted of three companies numbered 1st, 2nd, and 3rd. The battalion was deployed on the glaciers below Monte Mandrone in the Adamello group and continued to patrol the glaciers in the area. On 6 September 1916, the battalion lost its autonomy, was renamed Alpini Battalion "Monte Mandrone", and assigned to the 5th Alpini Regiment. The battalion's companies were renumbered 159th, 160th, and 161st. As the battalion was associated with the Alpini Battalion "Morbegno" its troops wore a white Nappina.

As the mountainous terrain of the Italian front made the deployment of entire Alpini regiments impracticable, the regimental commands of the eight Alpini regiments were disbanded in March 1916. Likewise in April 1916 the pre-war alpine brigade commands were disbanded, and the personnel of the regimental commands and alpine brigade commands used to from twenty regiment-sized group commands and nine brigade-sized grouping commands. Afterwards Alpini battalions were employed either independently or assigned to groups, groupings, or infantry divisions as needed. In August 1916, the Volunteer Unit "Vestone", which had served with the Alpini Battalion "Vestone" in the Lake Garda area was merged into the 1st Volunteer Unit, which in March 1918 was reorganized as 3rd Alpini Company and assigned to the Alpini Battalion "Mondovì", which also operated in the area of the Tonale Pass.

In February and March 1917 the Royal Italian Army formed twelve skiers battalions, each with two skiers companies. On 29 May 1917, the 24th Skiers Company was reorganized as 293rd Alpini Company and assigned to the Alpini Battalion "Monte Tonale", which was formed on the same day. The new battalion was assigned to the 5th Alpini Regiment and included, besides the 293rd Alpini Company, the newly formed 285th and 286th Alpini companies. The battalion was associated with the Alpini Battalion "Tirano" and therefore its troops wore a red Nappina.

On 22 February 1918, the I and II skiers battalions were disbanded and their personnel used to form the Alpini Battalion "Monte Ortler" and Alpini Battalion "Monte Cavento". The two battalions were assigned to the 5th Alpini Regiment. The Alpini Battalion "Monte Ortler", consisted of the 306th, 307th, and 308th Alpini companies and was associated with the Alpini Battalion "Edolo". Therefore the battalion's troops wore a green Nappina. The Alpini Battalion "Monte Cavento", consisted initially of the 309th and 310th Alpini companies, with the 311th Alpini Company, which was formed by reorganizing the 3rd Alpini Volunteers Company "Val Camonica", joining the battalion in June 1918. The battalion was associated with the Alpini Battalion "Vestone" and therefore its troops wore a blue Nappina. With the four additional Monte battalions the 5th Alpini Regiment now fielded 16 battalions and thus become the largest regiment in the history of the Royal Italian Army.

- Alpini Battalion "Monte Mandrone"
  - 159th, 160th, and 161st Alpini Company
- Alpini Battalion "Monte Tonale"
  - 285th, 286th, and 293rd Alpini Company
- Alpini Battalion "Monte Ortler"
  - 306th, 307th, and 308th Alpini Company
- Alpini Battalion "Monte Cavento"
  - 309th, 310th and 311th Alpini Company

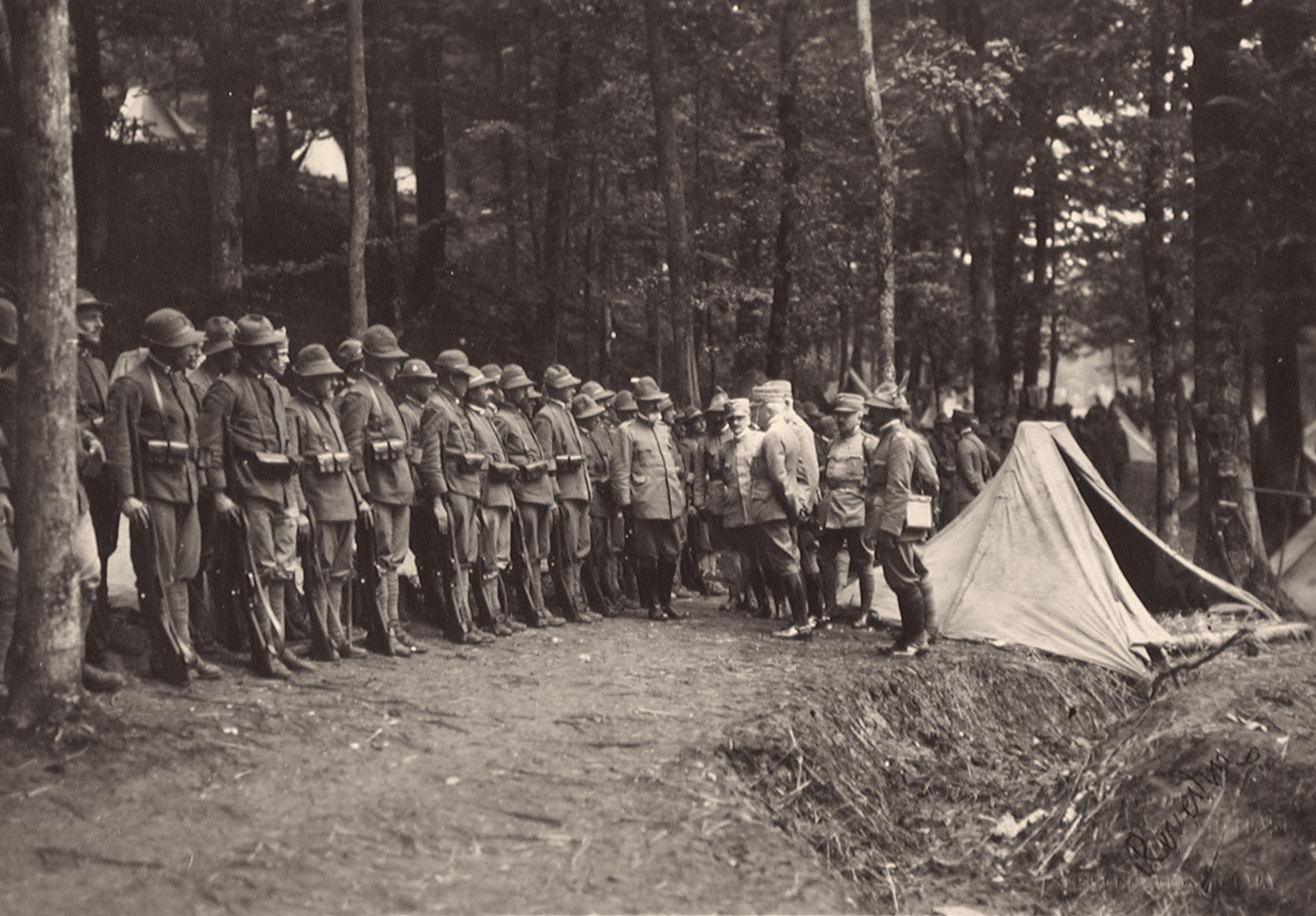
Alpini before the Battle of Mount Ortigara in June 1917

During the war the regiment's battalions served primarily on the glaciers of the Ortler Alps and the Adamello-Presanella Alps, as well as in the Giudicarie Alps. On 29 May 1916, the Alpini Battalion "Morbegno" was sent to the Asiago plateau, where the Austro-Hungarian Army had commenced the Battle of Asiago on 15 May. The "Morbegno", was deployed together with four battalions of the 2nd Alpini Regiment, on Monte Fior and Monte Castelgomberto, which the battalions held against repeated Austro-Hungarian attacks on 6–8 June 1918. The "Morbegno", which had suffered 449 casualties in these three days, and was awarded a Silver Medal of Military Valor for its conduct at Asiago and thus earned the regiment its only military award of World War I.

In October 1916, the Alpini battalions "Monte Adamello" and "Monte Suello" fought on Monte Pasubio, with the battalions "Morbegno" and "Monte Tonale" fighting there in 1917. In June 1917 the Alpini battalions "Tirano", "Vestone", "Valtellina", "Monte Spluga", and "Monte Stelvio" were assigned to the 1st Alpini Group for the Battle of Mount Ortigara. On 16 June 1917 the Alpini Battalion "Morbegno" arrived on Mount Ortigara as reinforcement. The six battalions suffered 454 killed in action, 2,234 wounded in action, and 403 missing in action on Ortigara. Overall the regiment suffered 268 officers and 6,307 soldiers killed in action and 499 officers and 10,745 soldiers were wounded during the war.

=== Interwar years ===
After the end of the war the Valle and Monte battalions were disbanded, while the Alpini Battalion "Morbegno" was sent in November 1918 to occupy the newly acquired city of Rijeka, where the battalion's 45th and 47th Alpini companies joined the rebels of Gabriele D'Annunzio, who took control of the city on 12 September 1919 and declared the Italian Regency of Carnaro. On 1 September 1920, the regimental command was reformed in Milan and the regiment consisted of the Alpini battalions "Tirano", "Edolo", "Vestone", "Trento", which had been formed on the same day, 1 September 1920, to replace the Alpini Battalion "Morbegno". On 12 February 1921, the regiment received the Alpini Battalion "Intra" from the 4th Alpini Regiment, and transferred the battalions "Edolo", "Vestone", and "Trento" to the 6th Alpini Regiment. With the transfer of the battalions also the military awards of the battalions were transferred from regiment to regiment and affixed to the respective regimental flags. On 31 May 1921, the Alpini Battalion "Tento" was renamed Alpini Battalion "Morbegno", and on 1 July of the same year the Alpini Battalion Val d'Adige of the 6th Alpini Regiment was renamed Alpini Battalion "Tento". The same year, the regiment, which consisted of the Alpini battalions "Intra" and "Tirano", moved from Milan to Bergamo and was assigned to the 2nd Alpine Division, which also included the 4th Alpini Regiment, 6th Alpini Regiment, and 3rd Mountain Artillery Regiment. In 1923, the 2nd Alpine Division was replaced by the II Alpini Grouping, which in 1926 was reorganized as II Alpine Brigade. The brigade included, besides the 5th Alpini Regiment, also the 6th Alpini Regiment, 7th Alpini Regiment, and 2nd Mountain Artillery Regiment. On 1 December 1923, the Gleno Dam collapsed and the regiment's Alpini Battalion "Tirano" was deployed to the affected area to search for survivors. For its work after the disaster the battalion was awarded a Bronze Medal of Civil Valor, which was affixed to the flag of the 5th Alpini Regiment and added to the regiment's coat of arms. In 1926 the regiment moved from Bergamo to Milan. In November of the same year the Alpini Battalion "Morbegno" returned from the 6th Alpini Regiment to the 5th Alpini Regiment, which in turn returned the Alpini Battalion "Intra" to the 4th Alpini Regiment in December.

On 1 October 1934, the Alpini Battalion "Edolo" returned from the 6th Alpini Regiment to the 5th Alpini Regiment. On 27 October of the same year, the II Alpine Brigade was renamed II Superior Alpine Command. In December of the same year the command was given the name "Tridentino". On 31 October 1935, the II Superior Alpine Command "Tridentino" was reorganized as 2nd Alpine Division "Tridentina", which included the 5th Alpini Regiment, 6th Alpini Regiment, and 2nd Alpine Artillery Regiment "Tridentina". During the same year the regiment moved from Milan to Meran. In 1935–36 the regiment provided personnel for the formation of the 10th Supply Column, which was sent to Eritrea for the Second Italo-Ethiopian War.

=== World War II ===
On 2 September 1939, one day after the German Invasion of Poland had begun, the Alpini battalions "Val d'Intelvi", "Valtellina", and "Val Camonica" were reformed with reservists and assigned to the 5th Alpini Group. On 10 June 1940, the day Italy entered World War II, the regiment fielded 160 officers and 5,046 other ranks for a total strength of 5,206 men. The regiment had 23 horses, 1,242 mules and 109 transport vehicles at its disposal. The regiment's organization at the time was as follows:

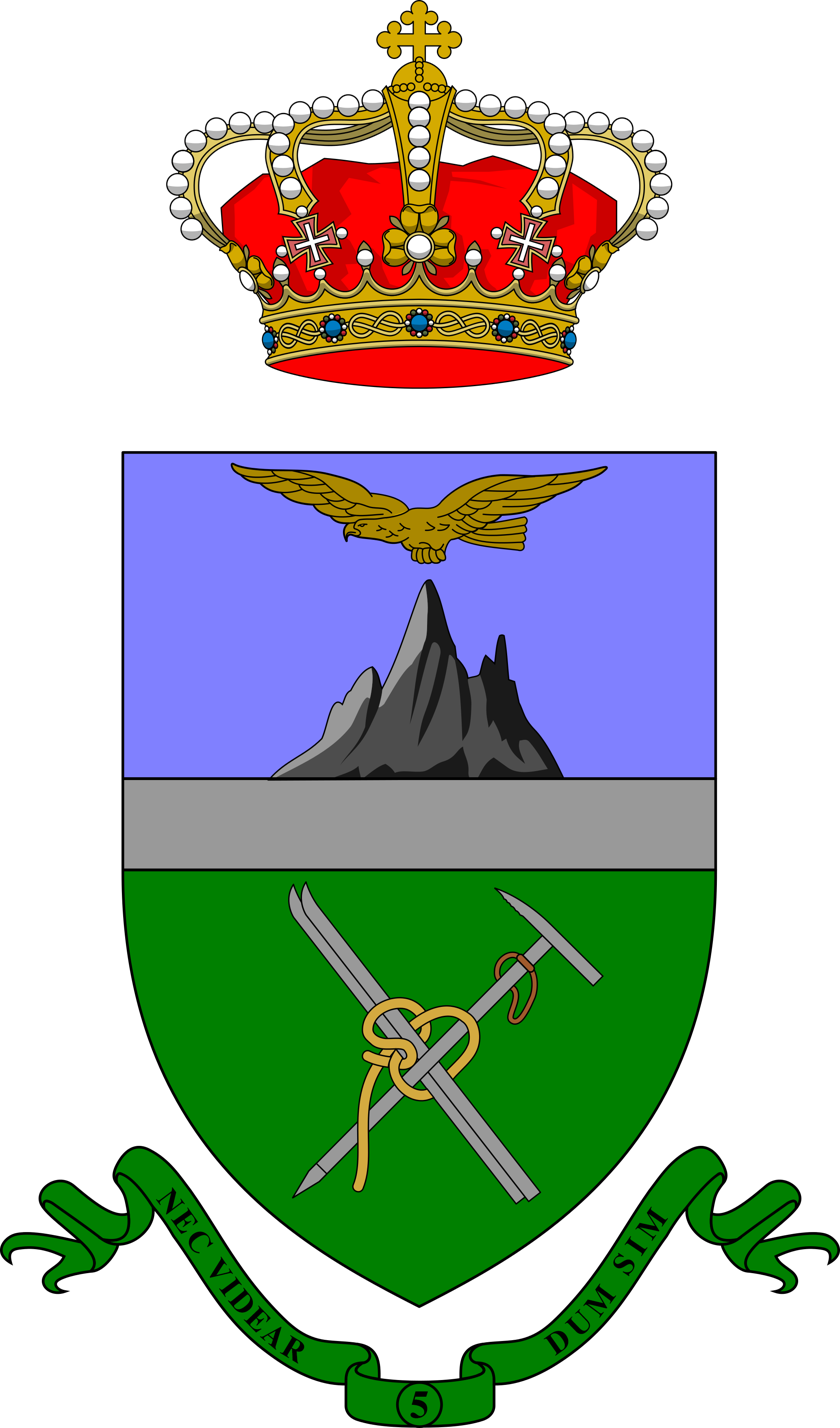
- 5th Alpini Regiment, in Meran
  - Regimental Command Company
  - Alpini Battalion "Morbegno”, in Bolzano
    - Command Company
    - 44th, 45th, and 47th Alpini Company
  - Alpini Battalion "Tirano", in Meran
    - Command Company
    - 46th, 48th, and 49th Alpini Company
  - Alpini Battalion "Edolo", in Mals
    - Command Company
    - 50th, 51st, and 52nd Alpini Company
  - 5th Supply Section
  - 5th Medical Section (includes the 618th Field Hospital)
  - 25th Train Section (equipped with mules)

In June 1940, the regiment participated in the invasion of France. After the Battle of France the Alpini battalions "Val d'Intelvi", "Valtellina", and "Val Camonica" were disbanded on 31 October 1940.

==== Greco-Italian War ====
In November 1940, the 2nd Alpine Division "Tridentina" was transferred to Albania to shore up the crumbling Italian front during the Greco-Italian War. On 14 November 1940, the 5th Alpini Regiment entered the front in the upper Devoll valley. In December 1940, the regiment suffered heavy losses in the Greek counter-offensive. The regiment retreated into Albania, where it continued to fight until the German invasion of Greece in April 1941. The "Tridentina" division then pursued the retreating Greek forces to Leskovik and Ersekë. After the war's conclusion the division returned to Italy. For its conduct and service on the Greek front from 14 November to 30 December 1940 the 5th Alpini Regiment was awarded a Gold Medal of Military Valor, which was affixed to the regiment's flag and added to the regiment's coat of arms.

In January 1941, the 5th Alpini Regiment formed the V Replacements Battalion, which was immediately sent to Albania to replace the losses the 5th Alpini Regiment had suffered in the Greek counteroffensive. The regiment then formed the CV Replacements Battalion, which consisted of the 627th 628th, and 629th companies. The battalion was sent to Albania and attached on 25 March 1941 to the 5th Alpine Division "Pusteria", which at the time was fighting in the Greco-Italian War. On 15 February 1942, the regiment formed a support weapons company for each of its three battalions. These companies were equipped with Breda M37 machine guns, and 45mm Mod. 35 and 81mm Mod. 35 mortars. The 107th Support Weapons Company was assigned to the Alpini Battalion "Morbegno", the 109th Support Weapons Company to the Alpini Battalion "Tirano", and the 110th Support Weapons Company to the Alpini Battalion "Edolo". On 11 April 1941, the CV Replacements Battalion was renamed Alpini Battalion Monte Resegone, but already on 25 May of the same year the battalion was disbanded and its remaining personnel assigned to the other battalions of the "Pusteria" division.

==== Eastern Front ====
On 2 March 1942, the 2nd Alpine Division "Tridentina" was assigned, together with the 3rd Alpine Division "Julia" and 4th Alpine Division "Cuneense", to the Alpine Army Corps. The corps was assigned to the Italian 8th Army, which was readied to be deployed in summer 1942 to the Eastern Front. In preparation for the deployment to the Soviet Union the 5th Alpini Regiment's depot formed on 1 April 1942 the 82nd Cannons Company, which was equipped with 47/32 mod. 35 anti-tank guns.

In June 1942, the depots of the 5th Alpini Regiment formed the V Replacements Battalion, which consisted of the 627th, 628th, and 629th Alpini companies, and the 405th Support Weapons Company. On 20 June 1942, the V Replacements Battalion was assigned to the newly formed 102nd Alpini Marching Regiment, which was assigned to the III Marching Brigade of the 8th Marching Division. The division provided replacement troops for the 8th Army's regiments fighting on the Eastern Front.

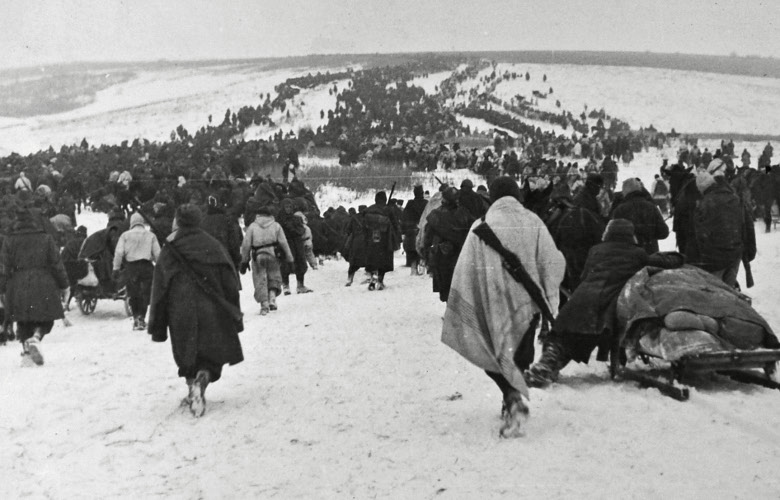
The Alpine Army Corps' retreat in Ukraine in January 1943

In July 1942 the three alpine division arrived in Eastern Ukraine, from where they marched eastwards towards the Don river. The Italian 8th Army covered the left flank of the German 6th Army, which spearheaded the German summer offensive of 1942 towards Stalingrad. On 12 December 1942, the Red Army commenced Operation Little Saturn, which, in its first stage, attacked and encircled the Italian II Army Corps and XXXV Army Corps, to the southeast of the Alpine Army Corps. On 13 January 1943, the Red Army launched the second stage of Operation Little Saturn with the Voronezh Front encircling and destroying the Hungarian Second Army to the northwest of the Alpine Army Corps.

On the evening of 17 January 1943, the Alpine Army Corps commander, General Gabriele Nasci, ordered a full retreat. At this point only the 2nd Alpine Division "Tridentina" was still capable of conducting combat operations. The 40,000-strong mass of stragglers — Alpini and Italians from other commands, plus German and Hungarians — followed the "Tridentina", which led the way westwards to the new Axis lines. As the Soviets had already occupied every village, bitter battles had to be fought to clear the way. On the morning of 26 January 1943, the spearheads of the "Tridentina' reached the hamlet of Nikolayevka, occupied by the Soviet 48th Guards Rifle Division. The Soviets had fortified the railway embankment on both sides of the village. General Nasci ordered a frontal assault and at 9:30 am the Battle of Nikolayevka began with the 6th Alpini Regiment leading the first attack. By noon the Italian forces had reached the outskirts of the village and the Alpine Army Corps' Chief of Staff General Giulio Martinat led the 5th Alpini Regiment forward for another assault, durich which General Martinat fell. By sunset the Alpini battalions were still struggling to break the Soviet lines and in a last effort to decide the battle before nightfall General Luigi Reverberi, the commanding General of the "Tridentina" division, ordered a human wave attack on the Soviet lines. The attack managed to break through the Soviet lines and the Italians continued their retreat, which was no longer contested by Soviet forces. On 1 February 1943 the remnants of the Alpine Army Corps reached Axis lines.

On 11 February 1943, the survivors were counted and 2,871 men of the regiment had were listed as killed or missing, and another 1,258 wounded. For its bravery and sacrifice in the Soviet Union the 5th Alpini Regiment was awarded a Gold Medal of Military Valor, which was affixed to the regiment's flag and added to the regiment's coat of arms.

In 1943, the regiment's depots in Italy reformed the Alpini battalions "Monte Spluga" and "Monte Stelvio", which were assigned to the 166th Coastal Alpini Regiment. The regiment was sent to occupied France on coastal defense duty in Provence. The 5th Alpini Regiment was still in the process of being rebuilt, when the Armistice of Cassibile was announced on 8 September 1943. Two days later, on 10 September 1943, the regiment was disbanded by invading German forces. A fate shared by the 166th Coastal Alpini Regiment in France.

=== Cold War ===
On 20 November 1945, the IV Brigade of the 210th Auxiliary Division was reorganized in the city of Meran as an Alpini regiment, with the I, II, and III Alpini battalions. On 15 December 1945, the three battalions were renamed Alpini Battalion "Bolzano" in Bolzano, Alpini Battalion "Trento" in Meran, and Alpini Battalion "Edolo" in Bruneck. Initially the regiment was designated 4th Alpini Regiment as it was formed within the area overseen by the IV Territorial Military Command. On 10 April 1946, the regiment was renumbered as 6th Alpini Regiment. On 1 May 1951, the 6th Alpini Regiment joined the newly formed Alpine Brigade "Tridentina" and on the same day the IV Battalion, of the disbanded Alpine Recruits Training Center in Trento, joined the 6th Alpini Regiment and was renamed Recruits Training Battalion.

On 31 December 1952, the 6th Alpini Regiment moved from Meran to Bruneck, as the next day, on 1 January 1953, the command of the 5th Alpini Regiment was reformed in Meran. On the same day the 5th Alpini Regiment joined the newly formed Alpine Brigade "Orobica", which also included the 5th Mountain Artillery Regiment. On 15 March 1953, the Alpini Battalion "Trento" in Meran and the Alpini Battalion "Edolo" in Bruneck switched names, and the "Edolo" battalion then joined the 5th Alpini Regiment. On 1 September of the same year, the Recruits Training Battalion was transferred from the 6th Alpini Regiment to the 5th Alpini Regiment. On 10 September 1953, the regiment reformed the Alpini Battalion "Tirano" in Meran. In 1954, the Alpini Battalion "Tirano" moved to Mals, with two of the battalion's companies based in the nearby city of Glurns. On 27 October 1955, the Recruits Training Battalion was renamed Recruits Training Battalion "Orobica", which on 1 February 1956 was transferred to the newly formed 12th Recruits Training Center in Montorio Veronese. On 1 October 1956, the regiment reformed the Alpini Battalion "Morbegno" in the city of Sterzing. In 1957 the regiment formed the 5th Mortar Company, which was split on 31 December 1964 to form a mortar company for each of the regiment's three battalions. Afterwards the regiment consisted of the following units:

- 5th Alpini Regiment, in Meran
  - Command Company, in Meran
  - Alpini Battalion "Morbegno", in Sterzing
    - Command and Services Company
    - 44th, 45th, and 47th Alpini Company
    - 107th Mortar Company
  - Alpini Battalion "Tirano", in Mals
    - Command and Services Company
    - 46th, 48th, and 49th Alpini Company (46th and 49th Alpini Company based in Glurns)
    - 109th Mortar Company
  - Alpini Battalion "Edolo", in Meran
    - Command and Services Company
    - 50th, 51st, and 52nd Alpini Company
    - 110th Mortar Company

During the 1975 army reform the army disbanded the regimental level and newly independent battalions were granted for the first time their own flags. On 31 July 1975, the Alpini Battalion "Edolo" was reorganized as a recruits training battalion. On 30 September 1975, the 5th Alpini Regiment was disbanded and the next day the regiment's three battalions became autonomous units and were assigned to the Alpine Brigade "Orobica". The Alpini battalions "Morbegno" and "Tirano" consisted now of a command, a command and services company, three Alpini companies, and a heavy mortar company with eight 120mm Mod. 63 mortars. Each of the two Alpini battalions fielded now 950 men (45 officers, 96 non-commissioned officers, and 809 soldiers).

On 12 November 1976 the President of the Italian Republic Giovanni Leone assigned with decree 846 the flag and traditions of the 5th Alpini Regiment to the Alpini Battalion "Morbegno", while the Alpini Battalion "Tirano" and Alpini Battalion "Edolo" were granted a new flag. At the same time the medals and military honors awarded to the Alpini battalions "Tirano" and "Edolo" were transferred from the flag of the 5th Alpini Regiment to the two battalions' flags, while the medals and military honors awarded to the entire regiment were duplicated for the flags of the two battalions.

=== Recent times ===
After the end of the Cold War Italian Army began to draw down its forces and on 27 July 1991 the Alpine Brigade "Orobica" was disbanded. The same day the Alpini Battalion "Morbegno", the Alpini Battalion "Edolo", and the Mountain Artillery Group "Bergamo" were transferred to the Alpine Brigade "Tridentina". On 7 August 1992, the Alpini Battalion "Morbegno" lost its autonomy and the next day the battalion entered the reformed 5th Alpini Regiment. During the same year the "Tridentina" brigade's Anti-Tank Company was disbanded and its personnel, with their TOW anti-tank guided missiles, assigned to the mortar companies of the Alpini battalions of the 5th Alpini Regiment and 11th Alpini Regiment, and of the Alpini Battalion "Bassano". Consequently the "Morbegno" battalion's 107th Mortar Company was renamed 107th Support Weapons Company.

In 2001 the 107th Support Weapons Company was split into the 107th Mortar Company and the 262nd Anti-tank Company "Val Brenta". On 31 December 2002, the Alpine Brigade "Tridentina" was disbanded and the next day the 5th Alpini Regiment was assigned to the Alpine Brigade "Julia". In 2011, the 262nd Anti-tank Company "Val Brenta" was disbanded and its personnel integrated into the 107th Mortar Company, which was renamed 107th Maneuver Support Company.

== Organization ==
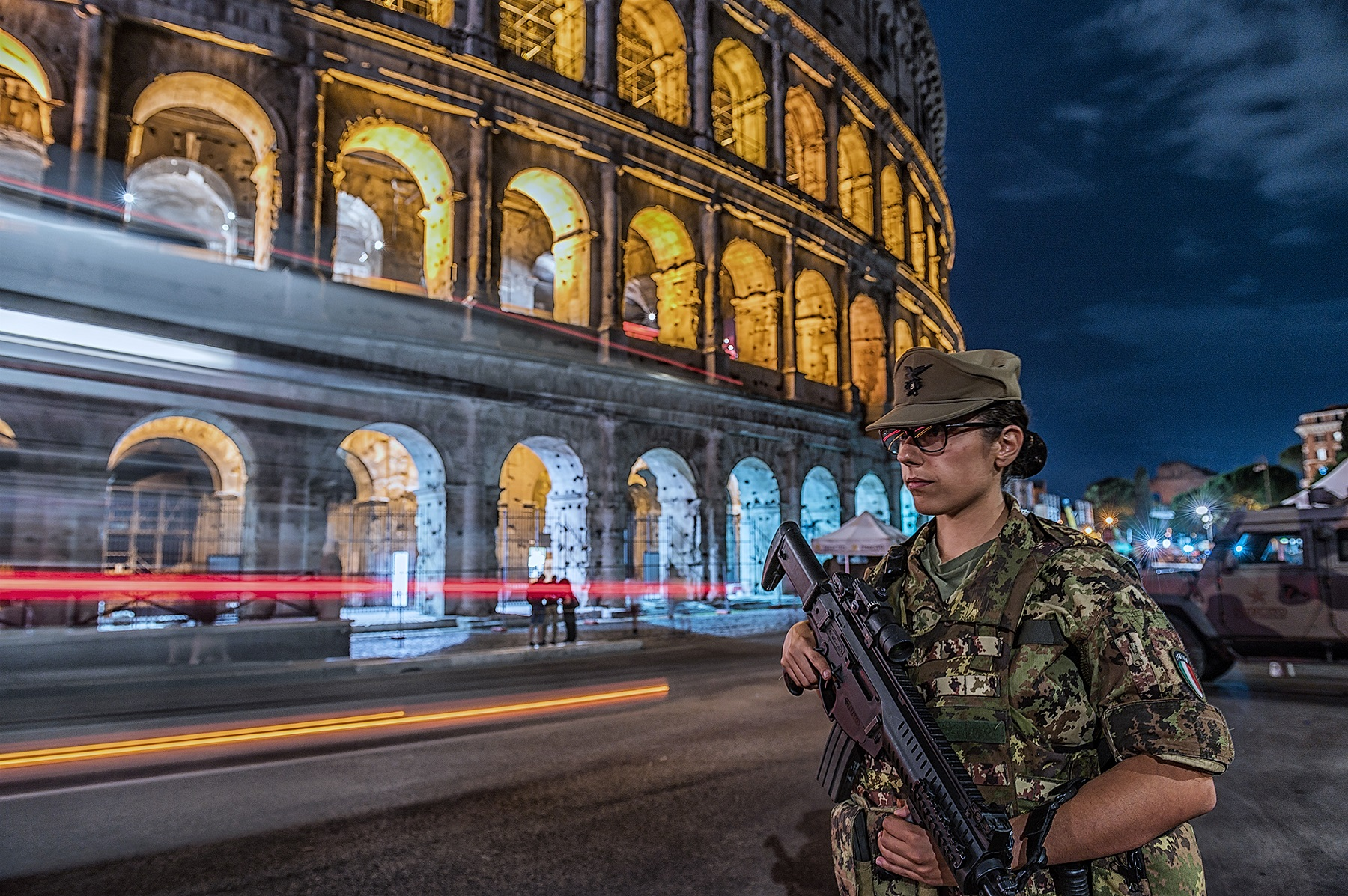
5th Alpini Regiment soldier guarding the Colosseum in Rome

As of 2024 the 5th Alpini Regiment is organized as follows:

- 5th Alpini Regiment, in Sterzing
  - Command and Logistic Support Company
  - Alpini Battalion "Morbegno"
    - 44th Alpini Company
    - 45th Alpini Company
    - 47th Alpini Company
    - 107th Maneuver Support Company

The Alpini companies are equipped with Bv 206S tracked all-terrain carriers and Lince light multirole vehicles. The maneuver support company is equipped with 120 mm mortars and Spike MR anti-tank guided missiles.

== See also ==
- Alpine Brigade "Julia"
