= Cantore =

Cantore is a surname of Italian origin. People with this surname include:

- Antonio Cantore (1860–1915), Italian general
- Dan Cantore (born 1946), American weightlifter
- Jim Cantore (born 1964), American meteorologist
- Matthew Cantore (born 1976), United States Space Force brigadier
- Sofia Cantore (born 1999), Italian footballer
