= 11th Alpini Regiment =

Inactive Italian Army mountain infantry unit

- 11° Reggimento Alpini
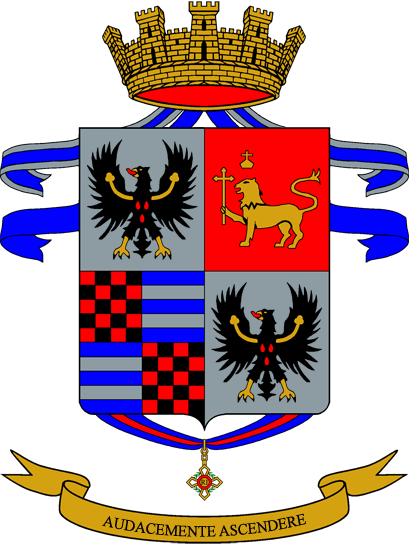
- Regimental coat of arms
- Active: 22 Dec. 1935 – 12 Sept. 1943; 1 Oct. 1975 – 18 March 2002
- Country: Italy
- Branch: Italian Army
- Type: Mountain Infantry
- Part of: Alpine Brigade "Tridentina"
- Garrison/HQ: Bruneck
- Motto: "Audacemente ascendere"
- Anniversaries: 15 February 1936
- Decorations: 1× Military Order of Italy; 2× Bronze Medals of Military Valor; 1× Italian Red Cross Bronze Medal of Merit

Insignia
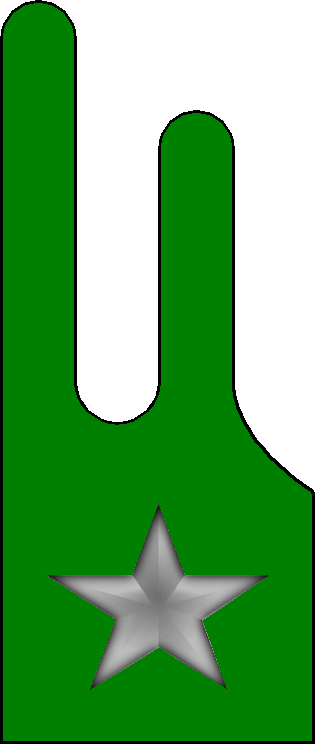
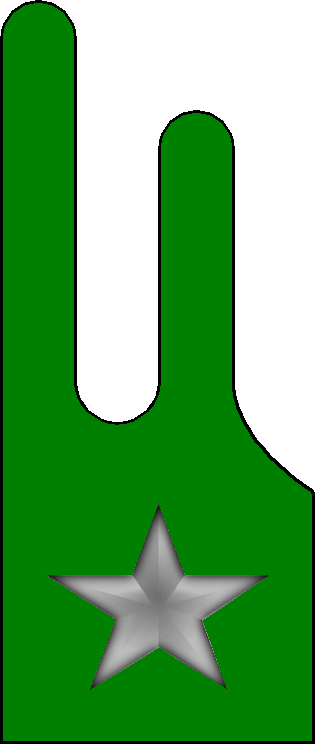
- Alpini gorget patches

The 11th Alpini Regiment (Italian: 11° Reggimento Alpini) is an inactive mountain warfare regiment of the Italian Army last based in Bruneck in South Tyrol. The regiment belongs to the Italian Army's Alpini infantry speciality and was last assigned to the Alpine Brigade "Tridentina". The regiment was formed by the Royal Italian Army on 22 December 1935 and assigned to the 5th Alpine Division "Pusteria", with which it participated in the Second Italo-Ethiopian War.

During World War II the regiment fought in the invasion of France and the Greco-Italian War. Afterwards the "Pusteria" division served on occupation duty in Montenegro and, after the occupation of Vichy France, in Alpes-Maritimes. On 8 September 1943, the Armistice of Cassibile was announced and four days later, on 12 September 1943, invading German forces disbanded the 11th Alpini Regiment.

In 1946, the Alpini Battalion "Trento" was reformed and assigned to the 6th Alpini Regiment. In 1975 the 6th Alpini Regiment was disbanded and the "Trento" battalion became an autonomous unit, which in 1976 was assigned the flag and traditions of the 11th Alpini Regiment. The battalion was assigned to the Alpine Brigade "Tridentina". The regiment was reformed in 1992 and disbanded in 2002. The regiment's anniversary falls on 15 February 1936, the day the Battle of Amba Aradam was fought, during which the regiment distinguished itself and was awarded a Bronze Medal of Military Valor.

== History ==
On 22 December 1935, the Royal Italian Army formed the command of the 11th Alpini Regiment in the city of Bruneck. Although the regiment was the tenth Alpini regiment to be formed, it was numbered as 11th Alpini Regiment, as the fascist regime had declared that the National Alpini Association, which had been founded on 8 July 1919 and included all veterans and reservists of the Alpini speciality, as the "10th Alpini Regiment". Hence the Royal Italian Army and later the Italian Army, never used the number 10 for an Alpini regiment.

=== Second Italo-Ethiopian War ===
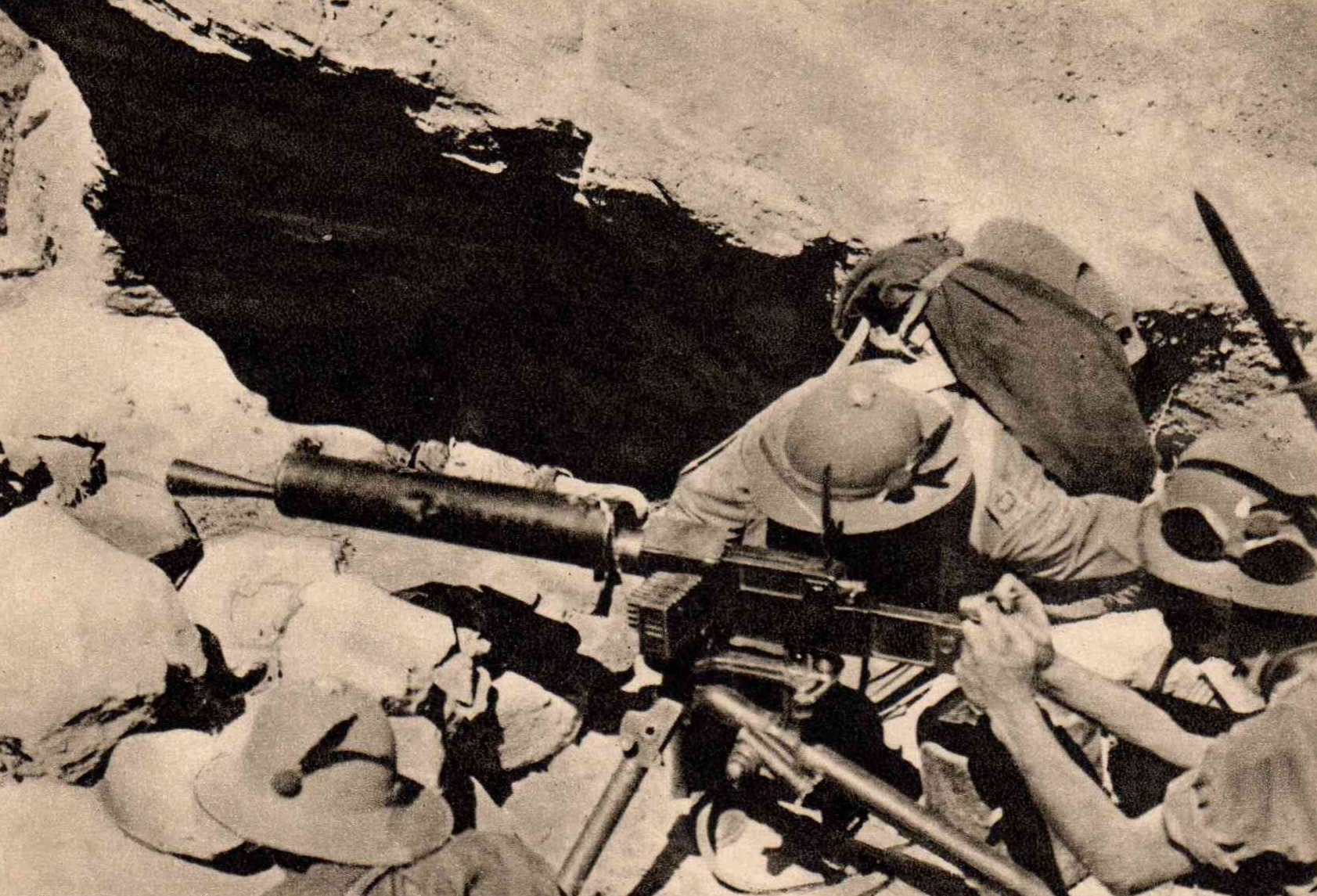
Alpini with a Fiat–Revelli Mod. 1914 machine gun during the Battle of Amba Aradam

After its formation the 11th Alpini Regiment received the Alpini Battalion "Saluzzo" from the 2nd Alpini Regiment, the Alpini Battalion "Intra" from the 4th Alpini Regiment, and the Alpini Battalion "Trento" from the 6th Alpini Regiment. On 31 December of the same year, the 11th Alpini Regiment was assigned to the newly formed 5th Alpine Division "Pusteria", which also included the 7th Alpini Regiment and 5th Alpine Artillery Regiment "Pusteria". On 6 January 1936 the "Pusteria" division, which had been formed for the Second Italo-Ethiopian War, embarked in Livorno and Naples for the transfer to Massawa in Eritrea. The same month the 6th Alpini Regiment formed the command and the 643rd Company of the XI Replacements Battalion. The replacement troops were volunteers drawn from the regiments, which had transferred battalions to the 11th Alpini Regiment for the war. The XI Replacements Battalion consisted of the 609th, 623rd, and 635th companies, with the 609th Company having been formed by the 2nd Alpini Regiment, the 623rd Company having been formed by the 4th Alpini Regiment, and the 635th Company by the 6th Alpini Regiment. Each of the three companies used a different colored Nappina on their Cappello Alpino, with the color corresponding to the battalion of the deployed regiment the company was meant to support. The XI Replacements Battalion was attached to 11th Alpini Regiment and immediately shipped to Eritrea, where in the meantime the "Pusteria" was engaged in combat against Ethiopian troops.

On 10–19 February 1936, the "Pusteria" fought in the Battle of Amba Aradam and on 27–29 February in the Second Battle of Tembien. The division then fought in the Battle of Maychew and the Battle of Lake Ashenge. After the end of the war the "Pusteria" remained in Ethiopia and was tasked with subjugating the restive population. In September 1936 the XI Replacements Battalion was disbanded and its remaining personnel distributed among the three battalions of the 11th Alpini Regiment. In March 1937, the "Pusteria" division returned to Italy, where its last units disembarked in Naples on 12 April 1937. The next day the division was honored with a parade through Rome and then the division's units returned to their bases. The command of the 11th Alpini Regiment and the Alpini Battalion "Trento" returned to the city of Trento, while the Alpini battalions "Saluzzo" and "Intra" returned on 17 April 1937 to their respective regiments.

For its service and conduct in Ethiopia the 11th Alpini Regiment was awarded, together with all other infantry regiments that had served in the war, a Military Order of Italy, which was affixed to the flag of the 11th Alpini Regiment and added to the regiment's coat of arms. The regiment was also awarded a Bronze Medal of Military Valor for its service and conduct in the war, while the Alpini Battalion "Trento" was awarded a separate Bronze Medal of Military Valor for its service and conduct in the war. Both Bronze Medals of Military Valor were affixed to the 11th Alpini Regiment's flag and added to the regiment's coat of arms.

On 17 April 1937, the Alpini Battalion "Trento" was permanently assigned to the 11th Alpini Regiment. Around the same time the Alpini Battalion "Trento II", which had been formed by the 6th Alpini Regiment as replacement for the Alpini Battalion "Trento", was disbanded and its personnel merged into the Alpini Battalion "Trento". The 11th Alpini Regiment also received the Complement Officer Cadets Battalion "Bolzano" of the 6th Alpini Regiment, which was detached to the Alpini specialty's Complement Officer Cadets School in Bassano del Grappa. On 25 September 1937 the regiment received the Alpini Battalion "Bassano" from the 9th Alpini Regiment. Afterwards the 11th Alpini Regiment consisted of the following units:

- 11th Alpini Regiment, in Trento
  - Alpini Battalion "Bassano", in Bruneck
    - 62nd, 63rd, and 74th Alpini Company
  - Alpini Battalion "Trento", in Trento
    - 94th, 144th, and 145th Alpini Company
  - Alpini Battalion "Bolzano", in Bassano del Grappa
    - 92nd, 141st, and 142nd Alpini Company

=== World War II ===
On 2 September 1939, one day after the German Invasion of Poland had begun, the Alpini battalions "Val Brenta", "Val Fassa", and "Val Venosta" were formed with reservists and assigned to the 6th Alpini Group. These reserve battalions were named for a valley (Italian: Valle; abbreviated Val) located near their associated regular Alpini battalion's base, and the reserve battalions received the same Nappina as their associated regular Alpini battalion.

- Alpini Battalion "Val Brenta"
  - 262nd, 263rd, and 274th Alpini Company
- Alpini Battalion "Val Fassa"
  - 227th, 237th, and 273rd Alpini Company
- Alpini Battalion "Val Venosta"
  - 282nd, 283rd, and 284th Alpini Company

On 10 June 1940, the day Italy entered World War II, the regiment fielded 160 officers and 5,046 other ranks for a total strength of 5,206 men. The regiment had 23 horses, 1,242 mules and 109 transport vehicles at its disposal. The regiment's organization at the time was as follows:

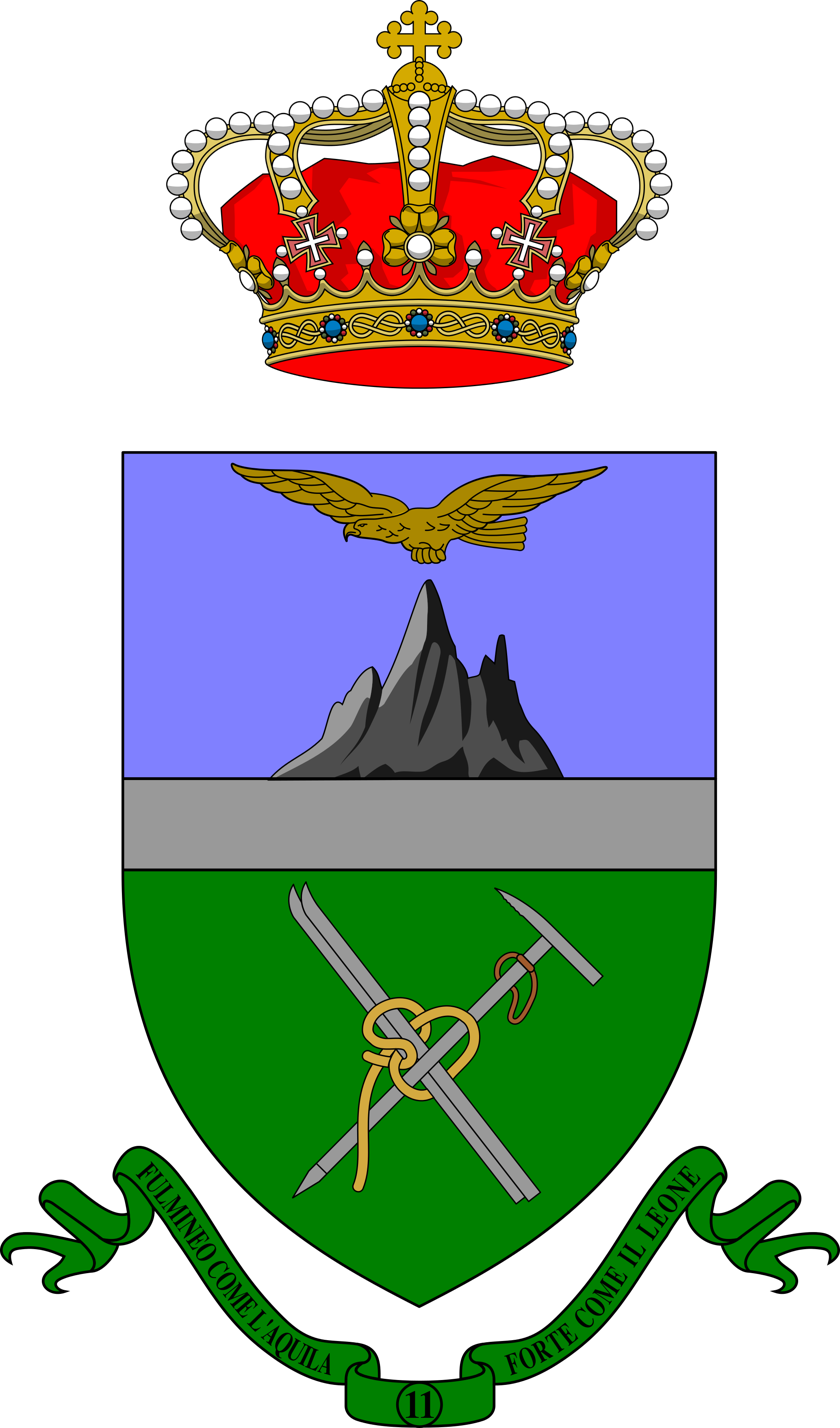
- 11th Alpini Regiment, in Trento
  - Regimental Command Company
  - Alpini Battalion "Bassano"
    - Command Company
    - 62nd, 63rd, and 74th Alpini Company
  - Alpini Battalion "Trento"
    - Command Company
    - 94th, 144th, and 145th Alpini Company
  - Alpini Battalion "Bolzano"
    - Command Company
    - 92nd, 141st, and 142nd Alpini Company
  - 11th Supply Section
  - 311th Medical Section (includes the 625th Field Hospital)
  - 211th Train Section (equipped with mules)

In June 1940 the regiment participated in the invasion of France. After the Battle of France the Alpini battalions "Val Venosta", "Val Fassa", and "Val Brenta" were disbanded on 31 October 1940.

In November 1940, the 5th Alpine Division "Pusteria" was transferred to Albania to shore up the crumbling Italian front during the Greco-Italian War. By late November 1940, the 11th Alpini Regiment entered the front in the Berat sector. In December 1940, the regiment suffered heavy losses in the Greek counter-offensive. The regiment retreated into Albania, where it continued to fight until the German invasion of Greece in April 1941. The "Pusteria" division then pursued the retreating Greek forces. For their conduct and service on the Greek front between November 1940 and April 1941 the Alpini battalions "Trento" and "Bolzano" were both awarded a Silver Medal of Military Valor, which were both affixed to the 11th Alpini Regiment's flag and added to the regiment's coat of arms.

After the conclusion of the Greco-Italian War and the Invasion of Yugoslavia in April 1941 the "Pusteria" division was sent in July 1941 as occupation force to Pljevlja in Montenegro. Soon the division was embroiled in heavy fighting against Yugoslavian Partisans, which culminated in the Battle of Pljevlja in December 1941. On 15 February 1942, the regiment formed a support weapons company for each of its three battalions. These companies were equipped with Breda M37 machine guns, and 45mm Mod. 35 and 81mm Mod. 35 mortars. The 127th Support Weapons Company was assigned to the Alpini Battalion "Bassano", the 128th Support Weapons Company to the Alpini Battalion "Trento", and the 129th Support Weapons Company to the Alpini Battalion "Bolzano".

In August 1942, the division was repatriated, and – after two months of rest – participated in the Axis occupation of Vichy France. Afterwards the "Pusteria" division took up garrison duties in Alpes-Maritimes. After the announcement of the Armistice of Cassibile on 8 September 1943 part of the division surrendered to invading German forces near Gap, while some units of the division managed to return to the Italian region of Piedmont, where they were dissolved.

=== Cold War ===
On 20 November 1945, the IV Brigade of the 210th Auxiliary Division, which had served with the American Fifth Army during the Italian campaign of World War II, was reorganized in the city of Meran as an Alpini regiment. The IV Brigade consisted of the 505th, 508th, and 514th guard battalions, which were redesignated as I, II, and III Alpini battalions. On 15 December 1945, the three battalions were renamed Alpini Battalion "Bolzano" in Bolzano, Alpini Battalion "Trento" in Meran, and Alpini Battalion "Edolo" in Bruneck. Initially the regiment was designated 4th Alpini Regiment as it had been formed within the area overseen by the IV Territorial Military Command. On 10 April 1946, the regiment was renumbered as 6th Alpini Regiment.

On 1 May 1951, the regiment joined the newly formed Alpine Brigade "Tridentina". On 31 December 1952, the regiment moved from Meran to Bruneck, as the next day, on 1 January 1953, the 5th Alpini Regiment was reformed in Meran. On 15 March 1953, the Alpini Battalion "Trento" in Meran and the Alpini Battalion "Edolo" in Bruneck switched names, and the "Edolo" battalion then joined the 5th Alpini Regiment. In the following years the Alpini Battalion "Trento" from Bruneck to Welsberg. On 31 December 1964, the 6th Mortar Company was split to form a mortar companies for each of the regiment's three battalions. Afterwards the Alpini Battalion "Trento" consisted of the following units:

- Alpini Battalion "Trento", in Welsberg
  - Command and Services Company
  - 94th, 144th, and 145th Alpini Company
  - 128th Mortar Company

During the 1975 army reform the army disbanded the regimental level and newly independent battalions were granted for the first time their own flags. On 30 September 1975, the 6th Alpini Regiment was disbanded and the next day the Alpini Battalion "Trento" became an autonomous unit and was assigned to the Alpine Brigade "Tridentina". The Alpini Battalion "Trento" consisted now of a command, a command and services company, three Alpini companies, and a heavy mortar company with eight 120mm Mod. 63 mortars. The battalion fielded now 950 men (45 officers, 96 non-commissioned officers, and 809 soldiers).

On 12 November 1976 the President of the Italian Republic Giovanni Leone assigned with decree 846 the flag and traditions of the 11th Alpini Regiment to the Alpini Battalion "Trento". At the same time the medals and military honors awarded to the Alpini Battalion "Trento", which had been affixed since 1946 on the flag of the 6th Alpini Regiment, were transferred to the flag of the 11th Alpini Regiment.

On 31 July 1983 the 1st Heavy Artillery Group "Adige", which was based in Elvas, was disbanded and the Mountain Artillery Group "Vicenza" of the "Tridentina" brigade moved from Bruneck to Elvas. Consequently the Alpini Battalion "Trento" moved from Welsberg to Bruneck.

=== Recents times ===
On 10 September 1992, the Alpini Battalion "Trento" lost its autonomy and the next day the battalion entered the reformed 11th Alpini Regiment. During the same year the "Tridentina" brigade's Anti-Tank Company was disbanded and its personnel, with their TOW anti-tank guided missiles, assigned to the mortar companies of the Alpini Battalion "Bassano" and the Alpini Battalion "Trento" of the 11th Alpini Regiment. Consequently the "Trento" battalion's 128th Mortar Company was renamed 128th Support Weapons Company. In November 1994 the regiment was sent to the Province of Asti, which had been inundated by severe floods. For its work in Asti the Italian Red Cross awarded the 11th Alpini Regiment a Bronze Medal of Merit, which was affixed to the regiment's flag.

In 2001 the 128th Support Weapons Company was split into the 128th Mortar Company and the 253rd Anti-tank Company "Val Chiese". On 18 March 2002, the 11th Alpini Regiment was disbanded and its remaining personnel merged into the 6th Alpini Regiment. Afterwards the regiment's flag was transferred to the Shrine of the Flags in the Vittoriano in Rome.

== Organization ==
When the 11th Alpini Regiment was disbanded it had the following organization:

- 11th Alpini Regiment, in Bruneck
  - Command and Logistic Support Company
  - Alpini Battalion "Trento"
    - 94th Alpini Company
    - 144th Alpini Company
    - 145th Alpini Company
    - 128th Mortar Company
    - 253rd Anti-tank Company "Val Chiese"
