= Sacrario militare di Pocol =

Memorial and cemetery in Vento, Italy

Coordinates: 46.5271°N 12.1169°E

- Italy
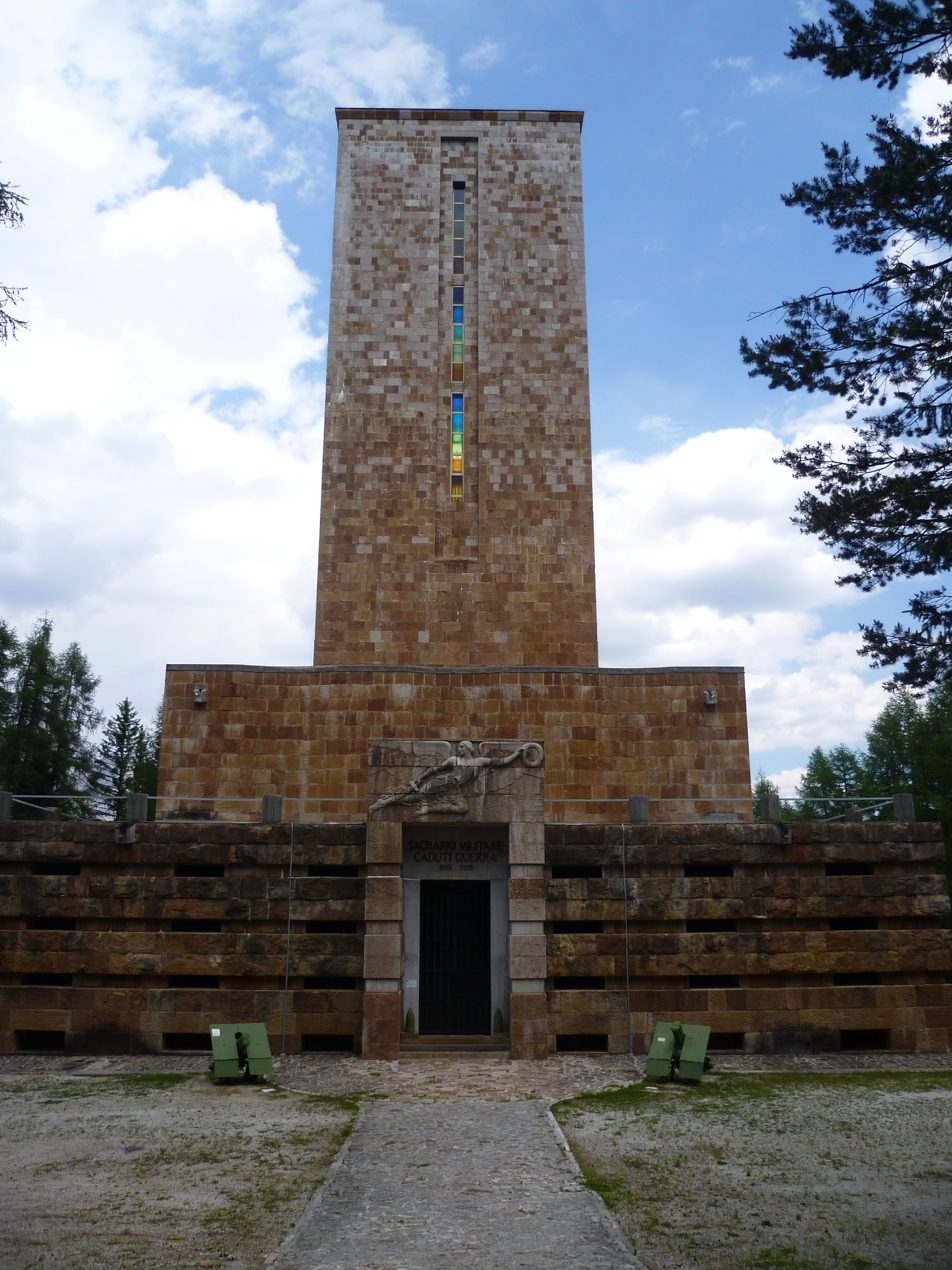
- For Italian soldiers killed on the Dolomites front in World War I
- Unveiled: 1935

Sacrario militare di Pocol (also known as Ossario di Pocol) is a cemetery and shrine near the Falzarego Pass, in the locality of Pocol in the comune of Cortina d'Ampezzo in the Veneto region of northern Italy. The small church and cemetery were built in 1916 as a military cemetery by the 5th Alpine group. A shrine was built in 1935 as memorial to the thousands who died during World War I on the Dolomite front. It is a massive square tower of stone, clearly visible from the entire Ampezzo valley below. The remains of 9,707 Italian soldiers (4,455 of them unknown) and 37 Austro-Hungarian soldiers are buried in the shrine. In a crypt in the centre of the structure rests the body of general Antonio Cantore, who was awarded the gold medal for military valor.
