= 18th Regiment "Edolo" =

Inactive Italian Army mountain infantry unit

- 18° Reggimento "Edolo"
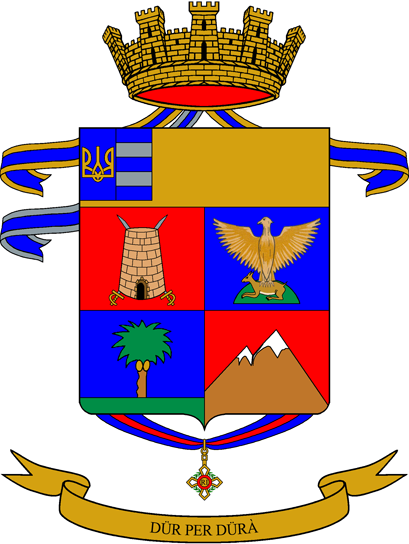
- Regimental coat of arms
- Active: 1 Oct. 1975 – 30 Sept. 2004
- Country: Italy
- Branch: Italian Army
- Type: Mountain Infantry
- Part of: Alpine Troops Command
- Garrison/HQ: Meran
- Motto: "Dür per Dürà" (Hard to survive)
- Anniversaries: 15 December 1940
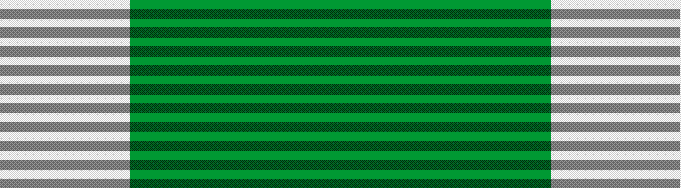
- Decorations: 1× Military Order of Italy; 2× Gold Medals of Military Valor; 1× Silver Medal of Military Valor; 1× Silver Medal of Merit

Insignia
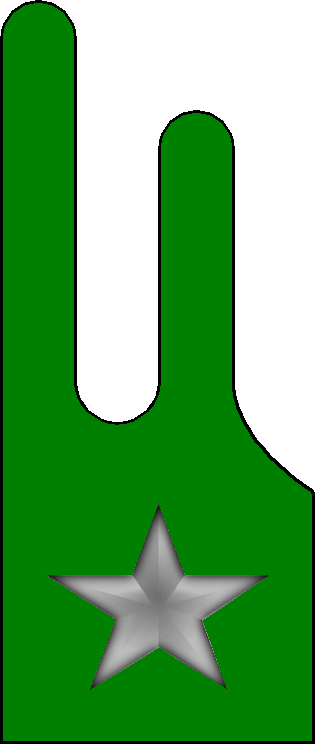
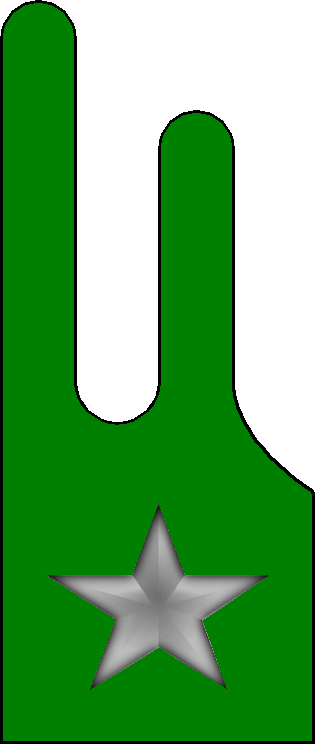
- Alpini gorget patches

The 18th Regiment "Edolo" (Italian: 18° Reggimento "Edolo") is an inactive mountain warfare regiment of the Italian Army last based in Meran in South Tyrol. The regiment belongs to the Italian Army's Alpini infantry speciality and was a training unit last assigned to the Alpine Troops Command. The regiment was formed in 1997 and consisted of the Alpini Battalion "Edolo", whose flag and traditions it inherited.

The Alpini Battalion "Edolo" was formed in 1886 and assigned to the 5th Alpini Regiment. In 1911–12, the battalion fought in the Italo-Turkish War. During World War I the battalion fought in the alpine areas of the Italian front. In World War II the battalion fought in the invasion of France, the Greco-Italian War, and on the Eastern Front, where the battalion was almost completely destroyed during the Red Army's Operation Little Saturn in winter 1942–43. On 8 September 1943, the Armistice of Cassibile was announced and two days later, on 10 September 1943, invading German forces disbanded the 5th Alpini Regiment and its battalions.

The battalion was reformed in 1945 and assigned to the 6th Alpini Regiment. In 1953, the battalion returned to the reformed 5th Alpini Regiment. In 1975 the 5th Alpini Regiment was disbanded and the "Edolo" battalion became an autonomous training unit, which in 1976 was granted its own flag. The battalion was assigned to the Alpine Brigade "Orobica". After the end of the Cold War the "Orobica" brigade was disbanded in 1991 and the battalion transferred to the Alpine Brigade "Tridentina". In 1997, the battalion entered the newly created 18th Regiment "Edolo", which one year later was transferred from the "Tridentina" brigade to the Alpine Troops Command. With the suspension of compulsory military service the regiment was disbanded in 2004. The regiment's anniversary falls on 15 December 1940, the day of the Greco-Italian War Battle of Dushar, during which the Alpini Battalion "Edolo" distinguished itself.

== History ==
On 1 November 1886, the Royal Italian Army's Alpini battalions changed their names from their recruiting zones to the cities and towns, where their base was located. At the same time Alpini soldiers and non-commissioned officers were issued thread tufts, called Nappina in Italian, which were clipped to the Cappello Alpino headdress, and colored white for the troops of a regiment's first battalion, red for the troops of a regiment's second battalion, green for the troops of a regiment's third battalion, and blue for the troops of a regiment's fourth battalion. On the same day the 5th Alpini Regiment's Battalion "Val Camonica" based in Edolo was renamed Alpini Battalion "Edolo". As the regiment's third battalion the "Edolo" battalion's troops received a green Nappina. The battalion's recruiting area was the Camonica Valley. Initially the battalion consisted of the 52nd, 53rd, 54th, and 55th Alpini companies, but the battalion soon ceded the 53rd, 54th, and 55th Alpini companies to help form the Alpini Battalion "Rocca d'Anfo". As replacement the battalion received the 50th and 51st Alpini companies from the Alpini Battalion "Tirano". In December 1908 the 5th Alpini Regiment was deployed to the area of the Strait of Messina for the recovery efforts after the 1908 Messina earthquake. For its service the regiment was awarded a Silver Medal of Merit, which was affixed to the regiment's flag.

=== Italo-Turkish War ===
On 29 September 1911 the Kingdom of Italy declared war against the Ottoman Empire and the Alpini Battalion "Edolo" was deployed to Libya for the Italo-Turkish War. On 11–12 February 1912, a platoon of the battalion's 51st Company distinguished itself during the defense of the Italian position designated Ridotta Lombardia near Derna, which was held in hand-to-hand combat against Bedouin forces. On 8–10 October 1912, the battalion distinguished itself in the Battle of Bu Msafer near Derna. For its conduct at Ridotta Lombardia and in the Battle of Bu Msafer the Alpini Battalion "Edolo", was awarded a Silver Medal of Military Valor, which was affixed to the flag of the 5th Alpini Regiment.

=== World War I ===
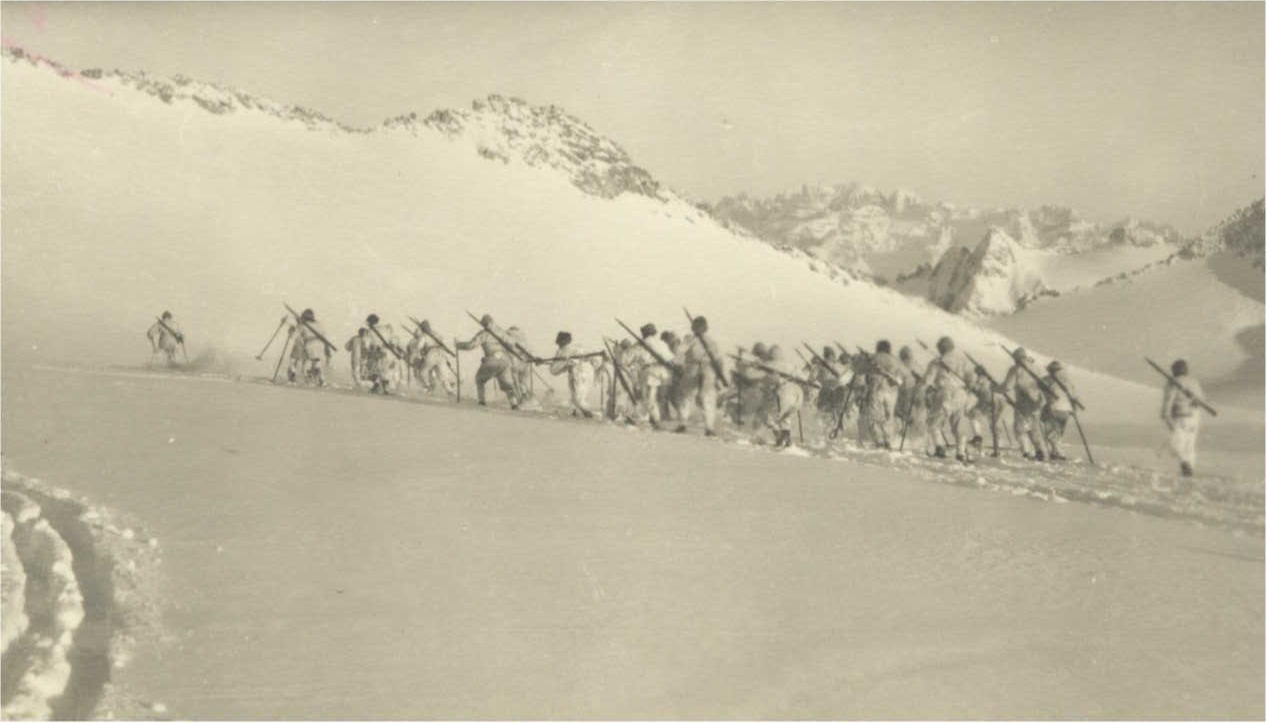
Italian Alpini patrol on the Adamello glacier

At the outbreak of World War I Italy declared its neutrality. In the autumn of 1914 the eight Alpini regiments formed 38 additional Alpini companies with men, who had completed their military service in the preceding four years. These companies were numbered from 80th to 117th and assigned to the existing Alpini battalions. The "Edolo" battalion formed two companies, the 90th, and 105th Alpini Company, and then consisted of five companies. In January 1915, each Alpini battalion began with the formation of a reserve battalion, with men, who had completed their military service at least four years, but not more than eleven years prior. These reserve battalions were named for a valley (Italian: Valle; abbreviated Val) located near their associated regular Alpini battalion's base, and the reserve battalions received the same Nappina as their associated regular Alpini battalion. The "Edolo" battalion formed the Alpini Battalion "Val Camonica", which consisted of the 250th, 251st, and 252nd Alpini Company.

On 23 May 1915, Italy declared war on Austro-Hungary and the Alpini Battalion "Edolo" occupied position on the Tonale Pass and in the Adamello group. As the mountainous terrain of the Italian front made the deployment of entire Alpini regiments impracticable the Alpini battalions were employed either independently or assigned to groups, groupings, or infantry divisions as needed. By the end of 1915 the Alpini regiments began to form additional companies with recruits born in 1896. These new companies were numbered from 118th to 157th and were used, together with the 38 companies formed earlier, to form an additional reserve battalion for each regular battalion. These new battalions were named for a mountain (Italian: Monte) located near their associated regular Alpini battalion's base, and the reserve battalions received the same Nappina as their associated regular Alpini battalion. On 1 January 1916, the Alpini Battalion "Edolo" ceded the 90th, and 105th Alpini Company to the newly formed Alpini Battalion "Monte Adamello", which also included the 138th Alpini Company.

In February and March 1917 the Royal Italian Army formed twelve skiers battalions, each with two skiers companies. On 22 February 1918, the I and II skiers battalions were disbanded and their personnel used to form the Alpini Battalion "Monte Ortler" and Alpini Battalion "Monte Cavento". The Alpini Battalion "Monte Ortler", consisted of the 306th, 307th, and 308th Alpini companies and was associated with the Alpini Battalion "Edolo". Therefore the battalion's troops wore a green Nappina. The "Edolo" battalion remained in the area of the Tonale Pass and Adamello group for the entire duration of the war.

=== Interwar years ===
On 12 February 1921, the Alpini Battalion "Edolo" was transferred to the 6th Alpini Regiment. On 1 October 1934, the Alpini Battalion "Edolo" returned from the 6th Alpini Regiment to the 5th Alpini Regiment. On 31 October 1935, the II Superior Alpine Command "Tridentino" was reorganized as 2nd Alpine Division "Tridentina", which included the 5th Alpini Regiment, 6th Alpini Regiment, and 2nd Alpine Artillery Regiment "Tridentina". During the same year the "Edolo" battalion moved to Mals.

=== World War II ===
On 10 June 1940, Italy entered World War II and the Alpini Battalion "Edolo", which consisted of a command company, and the 50th, 51st, and 52nd Alpini companies, participated, together with the rest of the 5th Alpini Regiment, in the invasion of France.

==== Greco-Italian War ====
In November 1940, the 2nd Alpine Division "Tridentina" was transferred to Albania to shore up the crumbling Italian front during the Greco-Italian War. On 14 November 1940, the 5th Alpini Regiment entered the front in the upper Devoll valley. In December 1940, the regiment suffered heavy losses in the Greek counter-offensive. The regiment retreated into Albania, where it continued to fight until the German invasion of Greece in April 1941. The "Tridentina" division then pursued the retreating Greek forces to Leskovik and Ersekë. After the war's conclusion the division returned to Italy. For its conduct and service on the Greek front from 14 November to 30 December 1940 the 5th Alpini Regiment was awarded a Gold Medal of Military Valor, which was affixed to the regiment's flag and added to the regiment's coat of arms.

On 15 February 1942, the 5th Alpini Regiment formed a support weapons company for each of its three battalions and the Alpini Battalion "Edolo" received the 110th Support Weapons Company. These companies were equipped with Breda M37 machine guns, and 45mm Mod. 35 and 81mm Mod. 35 mortars.

==== Eastern Front ====
On 2 March 1942, the 2nd Alpine Division "Tridentina" was assigned, together with the 3rd Alpine Division "Julia" and 4th Alpine Division "Cuneense", to the Alpine Army Corps. The corps was assigned to the Italian 8th Army, which was readied to be deployed in summer 1942 to the Eastern Front.

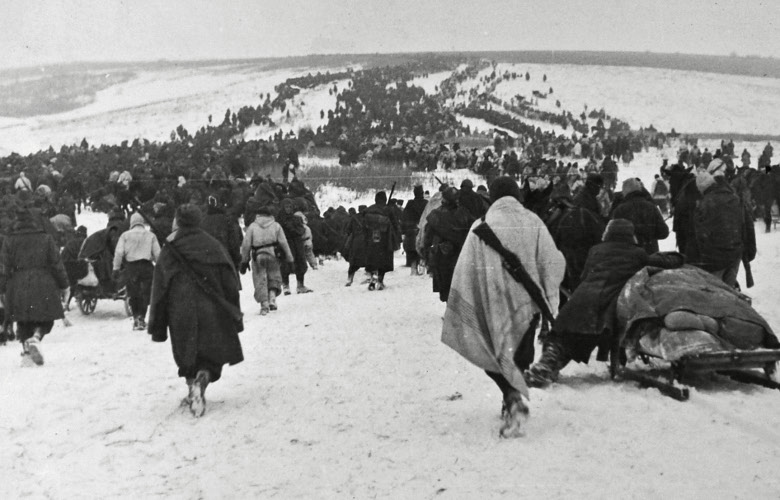
The Alpine Army Corps' retreat in Ukraine in January 1943

In July 1942 the three alpine division arrived in Eastern Ukraine, from where they marched eastwards towards the Don river. The Italian 8th Army covered the left flank of the German 6th Army, which spearheaded the German summer offensive of 1942 towards Stalingrad. On 12 December 1942, the Red Army commenced Operation Little Saturn, which, in its first stage, attacked and encircled the Italian II Army Corps and XXXV Army Corps, to the southeast of the Alpine Army Corps. On 13 January 1943, the Red Army launched the second stage of Operation Little Saturn with the Voronezh Front encircling and destroying the Hungarian Second Army to the northwest of the Alpine Army Corps.

On the evening of 17 January 1943, the Alpine Army Corps commander, General Gabriele Nasci, ordered a full retreat. At this point only the 2nd Alpine Division "Tridentina" was still capable of conducting combat operations. The 40,000-strong mass of stragglers — Alpini and Italians from other commands, plus German and Hungarians — followed the "Tridentina", which led the way westwards to the new Axis lines. As the Soviets had already occupied every village, bitter battles had to be fought to clear the way. On the morning of 26 January 1943, the spearheads of the "Tridentina" reached the hamlet of Nikolayevka, occupied by the Soviet 48th Guards Rifle Division. The Soviets had fortified the railway embankment on both sides of the village. General Nasci ordered a frontal assault and at 9:30 am the Battle of Nikolayevka began with the 6th Alpini Regiment leading the first attack. By noon the Italian forces had reached the outskirts of the village and the Alpine Army Corps' Chief of Staff General Giulio Martinat led the 5th Alpini Regiment forward for another assault, durich which General Martinat fell. By sunset the Alpini battalions were still struggling to break the Soviet lines and in a last effort to decide the battle before nightfall General Luigi Reverberi, the commanding General of the "Tridentina" division, ordered a human wave attack on the Soviet lines. The attack managed to break through the Soviet lines and the Italians continued their retreat, which was no longer contested by Soviet forces. On 1 February 1943 the remnants of the Alpine Army Corps reached Axis lines.

For its bravery and sacrifice in the Soviet Union the 5th Alpini Regiment was awarded a Gold Medal of Military Valor, which was affixed to the regiment's flag and added to the regiment's coat of arms. The 5th Alpini Regiment and its battalions were still in the process of being rebuilt, when the Armistice of Cassibile was announced on 8 September 1943. Two days later, on 10 September 1943, the regiment was disbanded by invading German forces.

=== Cold War ===
On 20 November 1945, the IV Brigade of the 210th Auxiliary Division was reorganized in the city of Meran as an Alpini regiment, with the I, II, and III Alpini battalions. On 15 December 1945, the three battalions were renamed Alpini Battalion "Bolzano" in Bolzano, Alpini Battalion "Trento" in Meran, and Alpini Battalion "Edolo" in Bruneck. Initially the regiment was designated 4th Alpini Regiment as it was formed within the area overseen by the IV Territorial Military Command. On 10 April 1946, the regiment was renumbered as 6th Alpini Regiment. On 1 May 1951, the 6th Alpini Regiment joined the newly formed Alpine Brigade "Tridentina". On 31 December 1952, the 6th Alpini Regiment moved from Meran to Bruneck, as the next day, on 1 January 1953, the command of the 5th Alpini Regiment was reformed in Meran. On the same day the 5th Alpini Regiment joined the newly formed Alpine Brigade "Orobica", which also included the 5th Mountain Artillery Regiment. On 15 March 1953, the Alpini Battalion "Trento" in Meran and the Alpini Battalion "Edolo" in Bruneck switched names, and the "Edolo" battalion then joined the 5th Alpini Regiment. In 1957 the regiment formed the 5th Mortar Company, which was split on 31 December 1964 to form a mortar company for each of the regiment's three battalions. Afterwards the Alpini Battalion "Edolo" consisted of the following units:

- Alpini Battalion "Edolo", in Meran
  - Command and Services Company
  - 50th, 51st, and 52nd Alpini Company
  - 110th Mortar Company

During the 1975 army reform the army disbanded the regimental level and newly independent battalions were granted for the first time their own flags. On 31 July 1975, the Alpini Battalion "Edolo" was reorganized as a recruits training battalion and the 110th Mortar Company reduced to a reserve unit. On 30 September 1975, the 5th Alpini Regiment was disbanded and the next day the regiment's three battalions became autonomous units and were assigned to the Alpine Brigade "Orobica". Although the "Edolo" battalion was assigned to the Alpine Brigade "Orobica" it also trained the recruits destined for the Alpine Brigade "Tridentina".

On 12 November 1976 the President of the Italian Republic Giovanni Leone granted the Alpini Battalion "Edolo" a new flag. At the same time the medals and military honors awarded to the "Edolo" battalion were transferred from the flag of the 5th Alpini Regiment to the battalion's flag, while the medals and military honors awarded to the entire regiment were duplicated for the flag of the battalion. Consequently, the "Edolo" battalion's flag was decorated with one Military Order of Italy, two Gold Medals of Military Valor, one Silver Medal of Military Valor, and one Silver Medal of Merit. The first four awards were also added to the battalion's newly created coat of arms.

=== Recent times ===
After the end of the Cold War Italian Army began to draw down its forces and on 27 July 1991 the Alpine Brigade "Orobica" was disbanded. The same day the Alpini Battalion "Morbegno", the Alpini Battalion "Edolo", and the Mountain Artillery Group "Bergamo" were transferred to the Alpine Brigade "Tridentina". During the same year the "Edolo" battalions 110th Mortar Company was disbanded.

On 12 September 1997, the Alpini Battalion "Edolo" lost its autonomy and the next day the battalion entered the newly formed 18th Regiment "Edolo", which inherited the "Edolo" battalion's flag, traditions, honors and coat of arms. On the same date the "Edolo" battalion's 52nd Alpini Company was suspended. On 1 March 1998, the regiment was transferred from the Alpine Brigade "Tridentina" to the Alpine Troops Command.

With the suspension of compulsory military service the 18th Regiment "Edolo" was disbanded on 30 September 2004 and the regiment's flag transferred to the Shrine of the Flags in the Vittoriano in Rome.

== Organization ==
When the 18th Regiment "Edolo" was disbanded it had the following organization:

- 18th Regiment "Edolo", in Meran
  - Command and Logistic Support Company
  - Alpini Battalion "Edolo"
    - 50th Alpini Company
    - 51st Alpini Company
    - 52nd Alpini Company (suspended 1997)
    - 110th Mortar Company (reserve unit 1975–91, disbanded 1991)
