= 6th Alpini Regiment =

Active Italian Army mountain infantry unit

- 6° Reggimento Alpini
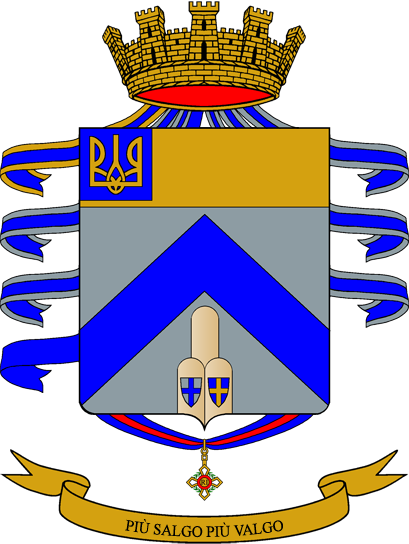
- Regimental coat of arms
- Active: 1 Nov. 1882 – 10 Sept. 1943; 10 April 1946 – today
- Country: Italy
- Branch: Italian Army
- Type: Mountain Infantry
- Part of: Alpine Training Center
- Garrison/HQ: Bruneck
- Mottos: "Più salgo più valgo" (the higher I climb, the more I'm worth)
- Anniversaries: 10 June 1917
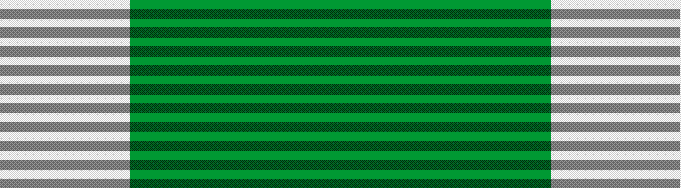
- Decorations: 1× Military Order of Italy; 1× Gold Medal of Military Valor; 5× Silver Medals of Military Valor; 1× Bronze Medal of Military Valor; 1× Italian Red Cross Bronze Medal of Merit; 1× Silver Medal of Merit

Insignia
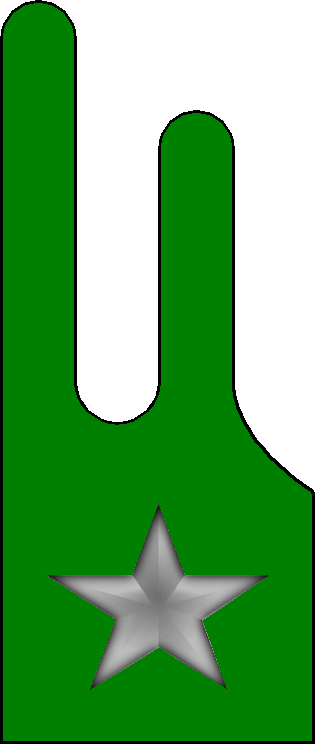
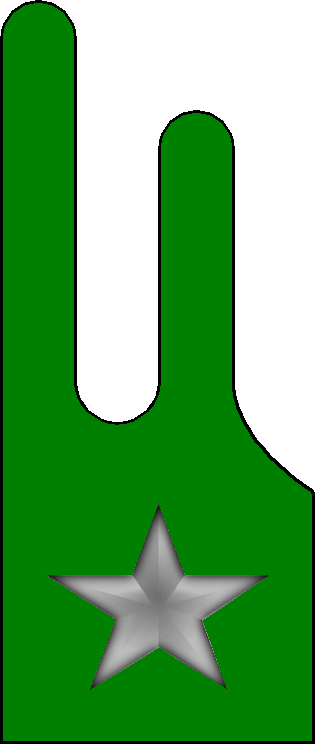
- Alpini gorget patches

The 6th Alpini Regiment (Italian: 6° Reggimento Alpini) is a mountain warfare training regiment of the Italian Army based in Bruneck in South Tyrol. The regiment belongs to the Italian Army's Alpini infantry speciality and is assigned to the Alpine Training Center in Aosta. On 1 November 1882, the Royal Italian Army formed the 6th Alpini Regiment, which had its recruiting area initially in the Vicentine Alps, Bellunes Alps, Carnic Alps, Carnic Prealps, and the Western side of the Julian Alps. In 1887 the regiment was split to form the 7th Alpini Regiment and afterwards the regiment's recruiting area consisted of the Vicentine Alps.

During World War I the regiment expanded to ten battalions, which fought separately in the alpine areas of the Italian front. In 1935 the regiment was assigned to the 2nd Alpine Division "Tridentina", with which it served during World War II in the invasion of France and the Greco-Italian War. In summer 1942 the division was transferred to the Eastern Front in the Soviet Union, where it was destroyed in winter 1942–43 during the Soviet Operation Little Saturn. The remnants of the division were repatriated in spring 1943. For its service and sacrifice on the Eastern Front the 6th Alpini Regiment was awarded Italy's highest military honor the Gold Medal of Military Valor. On 8 September 1943, the Armistice of Cassibile was announced and two days later, on 10 September 1943, invading German forces disbanded the 6th Alpini Regiment.

On 10 April 1946, the 6th Alpini Regiment was reformed and in 1951 assigned to the Alpine Brigade "Tridentina". In 1975 the regiment was disbanded and its flag and traditions assigned to the Alpini Battalion "Bassano". The regiment was reformed in 1993. On 1 January 2003, the regiment was assigned to the Alpine Troops Command and then reorganized as a mountain warfare training regiment. On 1 January 2009, the regiment was assigned to the Alpine Training Center. The regiment's anniversary falls on 10 June 1917, the height of the Battle of Mount Ortigara, during which four of the regiment's battalions earned a Silver Medal of Military Valor.

== History ==
On 15 October 1872, the Royal Italian Army formed 15 locally recruited Alpini companies in the alpine regions of Northern Italy. Nine more companies were formed the following year. In 1875 the 24 companies were organized into seven battalions, and in 1878 the companies were increased to 36 and the battalions to ten. On 1 November 1882, the Alpini companies were increased to 72 and grouped into 20 battalions. On the same date the battalions were assigned to six newly formed Alpini regiments, which were numbered 1st to 6th from West to East, while companies were numbered from 1 to 72 from to West to East. Upon entering the regiments, the battalions, which until then had been designated by a Roman numeral, were named for their recruiting zone, while the Alpini companies were renumbered sequentially from 1st to 72nd. One of the six Alpini regiments formed on 1 November 1882 was the 6th Alpini Regiment, which was formed in Conegliano in Veneto. The new regiment received the Battalion "Val d'Orco", which recruited in the Orco Valley, the Battalion "Val d'Aosta", which recruited in the Aosta Valley, the Battalion "Cadore", which recruited in the Cadore area, and the Battalion "Val Tagliamento", which recruited in the Tagliamento Valley.

- 6th Alpini Regiment, in Conegliano
  - Battalion "Val d'Orco", in Ivrea
    - 38th, 39th, and 40th Company
  - Battalion "Val d'Aosta", in Aosta
    - 41st, 42nd, and 43rd Company
  - Battalion "Cadore", in Pieve di Cadore
    - 65th, 66th, 67th, and 68th Company
  - Battalion "Val Tagliamento", in Gemona
    - 69th, 70th, 71st, and 72nd Company

On 1 April 1885, the regiment transferred the battalions "Val d'Orco" and "Val d'Aosta" to the 4th Alpini Regiment, and received in turn from the 2nd Alpini Regiment the Battalion "Val Schio", which recruited in the Schio Valley, from the 3rd Alpini Regiment the Battalion "Monte Lessini", which recruited in Lessinia, and from the 4th Alpini Regiment the Battalion "Val Brenta", which recruited in the Brenta valley. On 1 November 1886, the battalions changed their names from their recruiting zones to the cities and towns, where their base was located. At the same time Alpini soldiers and non-commissioned officers were issued thread tufts, called Nappina in Italian, which were clipped to the Cappello Alpino headdress, and colored white for the troops of a regiment's first battalion, red for the troops of a regiment's second battalion, green for the troops of a regiment's third battalion, and blue for the troops of a regiment's fourth battalion. On the same day, 1 November 1886, the 6th Alpini Regiment formed the Alpini Battalion "Feltre", with companies ceded by the Battalion "Val Brenta" and Battalion "Cadore". At the same time the regiment formed three new Alpini companies, which were numbered 73rd, 74th, and 75th. As the regiment had become too complex to administer it was divided on 1 August 1887 into the 6th Alpini Regiment and 7th Alpini Regiment. The latter was formed in Conegliano with the regimental command of the 6th Alpini Regiment and the battalions "Feltre", "Pieve di Cadore" and "Gemona". On the same date the regimental command of the 6th Alpini Regiment was reformed in Verona and the regiment consisted afterwards of the following units:

- 6th Alpini Regiment, in Verona
  - Alpini Battalion "Verona", in Verona (former Battalion "Monte Lessini")
    - 56th, 57th, 58th, and 73rd Alpini Company
  - Alpini Battalion "Vicenza", in Vicenza (former Battalion "Val Schio")
    - 59th, 60th, and 61st Alpini Company
  - Alpini Battalion "Bassano", in Bassano (former Battalion "Val Brenta")
    - 62nd, 63rd, and 74th Alpini Company

In 1887–88 the regiment's 56th Alpini Company deployed to Massawa for the Italo-Ethiopian War of 1887–1889, which led to the establishment of the Italian colony of Eritrea. In 1895–96 the regiment provided 19 officers and 523 troops to help form the I and V provisional Alpini battalions, which were deployed to Eritrea for the First Italo-Ethiopian War. In 1901 the regiment was assigned together with the 7th Alpini Regiment to the III Alpini Group, which on 9 August 1910 was renamed III Alpine Brigade. In December 1908 the regiment was deployed to the area of the Strait of Messina for the recovery efforts after the 1908 Messina earthquake. For its service the regiment was awarded a Silver Medal of Merit, which was affixed to the regiment's flag.

In 1911, the Alpini Battalion "Verona" was deployed to Libya for the Italo-Turkish War. On 18–19 June 1913, the battalion distinguished itself in the Battle of Ettangi against local rebel forces and was awarded a Silver Medal of Military Valor, which was affixed to the flag of the 6th Alpini Regiment and added to the regiment's coat of arms. During the war the 6th Alpini Regiment also provided one officer and 125 troops to augment other units fighting in the war.

=== World War I ===
At the outbreak of World War I the Alpini speciality consisted of eight regiments, which fielded 26 battalions with 79 companies. Each Alpini battalion, with the exception of the Alpini Battalion "Verona", fielded three Alpini companies, while the Alpini Battalion "Verona" fielded four companies. Each company consisted of one captain, four lieutenants and 250 other ranks. After Italy's initial declaration of neutrality 38 additional Alpini companies were formed during the autumn of 1914 with men, who had completed their military service in the preceding four years. These companies were numbered from 80th to 117th and assigned to the existing Alpini battalions. In January 1915, each Alpini battalion formed a reserve battalion, with men, who had completed their military service at least four years, but not more than eleven years prior. These reserve battalions were named for a valley (Italian: Valle; abbreviated Val) located near their associated regular Alpini battalion's base, and the reserve battalions received the same Nappina as their associated regular Alpini battalion. The companies of the Valle battalions were numbered from 201st to 281st, with the numbers 227th, 233rd, 237th, 271st, and 273rd unused.

On 23 May 1915, Italy declared war on Austria-Hungary and at the time the 6th Alpini Regiment consisted of the following units:

- 6th Alpini Regiment, in Verona
  - Alpini Battalion "Verona"
    - 56th, 57th, 58th, 73rd, and 92nd Alpini Company
  - Alpini Battalion "Vicenza"
    - 59th, 60th, 61st, 93rd, and 108th Alpini Company
  - Alpini Battalion "Bassano"
    - 62nd, 63rd, 74th, and 94th Alpini Company
  - Alpini Battalion "Val d'Adige"
    - 256th, 257th, and 258th Alpini Company
  - Alpini Battalion "Val Leogra"
    - 259th, 260th, and 261st Alpini Company
  - Alpini Battalion "Val Brenta"
    - 262nd, 263rd, and 274th Alpini Company

By the end of 1915 the Alpini regiments began to form additional companies with recruits born in 1896. These new companies were numbered from 118th to 157th and were used, together with the 38 companies formed earlier, to form an additional reserve battalion for each regular battalion. These new battalions were named for a mountain (Italian: Monte) located near their associated regular Alpini battalion's base, and the reserve battalions received the same Nappina as their associated regular Alpini battalion. The 6th Alpini Regiment thus added the following Monte battalions:

- Alpini Battalion "Monte Baldo"
  - 92nd, 141st, and 142nd Alpini Company
- Alpini Battalion "Monte Berico"
  - 93rd, 108th, and 143rd Alpini Company
- Alpini Battalion "Sette Comuni"
  - 94th, 144th, and 145th Alpini Company

As the mountainous terrain of the Italian front made the deployment of entire Alpini regiments impracticable, the regimental commands of the eight Alpini regiments were disbanded in March 1916. Likewise in April 1916 the pre-war alpine brigade commands were disbanded, and the personnel of the regimental commands and alpine brigade commands used to from twenty regiment-sized group commands and nine brigade-sized grouping commands. Afterwards Alpini battalions were employed either independently or assigned to groups, groupings, or infantry divisions as needed.

In February and March 1917 the Royal Italian Army formed twelve skiers battalions, each with two skiers companies. On 1 June 1917, the III and IV Skiers battalions were disbanded and their personnel used to form Alpini Battalion "Monte Pasubio". The new battalion was assigned to the 6th Alpini Regiment and consisted of the 290th, 291st, and 292nd Alpini companies. The battalion was associated with the Alpini Battalion "Vicenza" and therefore its troops wore a red Nappina.

In June 1917 the Alpini battalions "Verona", "Bassano", "Monte Baldo", and "Sette Comuni" were assigned to the 9th Alpini Group for the Battle of Mount Ortigara. The four battalions suffered 228 killed in action, 1,601 wounded in action, and 584 missing in action on Ortigara. In November and December 1917, after the disastrous Battle of Caporetto, the following retreat to the Piave river, and the subsequent First Battle of the Piave River and First Battle of Monte Grappa, the Royal Italian Army disbanded twenty Alpini battalions, which had suffered heavy casualties during the battles and retreat. Among the twenty battalions was the Alpini Battalion "Val Leogra", which was disbanded on 25 November 1917 to bring the other battalions of the regiment back up to full strength.

During the war 201 officers and 3,294 soldiers of the regiment were killed in action, while 460 officers and 8,670 soldiers were wounded. For their service and sacrifice during the war eight of the regiment's battalions were awarded a Silver Medal of Military Valor:

- the Alpini Battalion "Bassano" was awarded a Silver Medal of Military Valor for taking and holding key positions on Monte Čukla on 10 May 1916.
- the Alpini Battalion "Val Leogra" was awarded a Silver Medal of Military Valor for taking the summit of Monte Cimone on 23 July 1916.
- the Alpini Battalion "Val Brenta" was awarded a Silver Medal of Military Valor for withstanding a series of heavy enemy attacks on Monte Cauriol on 2–3 September 1916.
- the Alpini Battalion "Vicenza" was awarded a Silver Medal of Military Valor for its conduct on during the Battle of Asiago in May–July 1916, its conduct on the Coston di Lora in the Pasubio massif on 10 September 1916, on the Sasso Rosso on 28 January 1918 and on Monte Cornone on 10 February 1918.
- the Alpini Battalion "Monte Berico" was awarded a Silver Medal of Military Valor for its conduct during the Battle of Asiago at Vallarsa in May and June 1916, for the conquest and subsequent defense of Austro-Hungarian positions on the Pasubio massif from 10 September to 10 October 1916, for its conduct on Cima Grama in the Val Posina in July 1916, its conduct on Monte Čukla in October 1917 and on Monte Badenecche in December 1917, for its conduct in the Val Frenzela on 28–29 January 1918, and its conduct during the Battle of Vittorio Veneto in October–November 1918.
- the Alpini battalions "Verona", "Bassano", "Monte Baldo", and "Sette Comuni" were awarded a shared Silver Medal of Military Valor for their conduct during the Battle of Mount Ortigara on 10–20 June 1917.

The six Silver Medals of Military Valor were affixed to the 6th Alpini Regiment's flag and added to the regiment's coat of arms.

=== Interwar years ===
After the end of the war the Valle and Monte battalions were disbanded. On 5 November 1919, the Alpini Battalion "Monte Baldo" was reformed and sent to in early 1920 to Upper Silesia to provide security for the Upper Silesia plebiscite scheduled for 20 March 1921. During 1920 the Alpini Battalion "Sette Comuni" was reformed, which was renamed on 1 September of the same year Alpini Battalion "Val d'Adige". In 1921, the regiment received the Alpini battalions "Edolo", "Vestone", and "Trento" from the 5th Alpini Regiment, and in turn transferred the Alpini Battalion "Verona" to the 8th Alpini Regiment and the Alpini battalions "Vicenza" and "Bassano" to the newly formed 9th Alpini Regiment. With the transfer of the battalions also the military awards of the battalions were transferred from regiment to regiment and affixed to the respective regimental flags. On 31 May 1921, the Alpini Battalion "Tento" was renamed Alpini Battalion "Morbegno", while on 1 July of the same year the Alpini Battalion Val d'Adige was renamed Alpini Battalion "Tento". On 30 June 1921, the regiment moved from Verona to the newly annexed city of Brixen. Around the same time the Alpini Battalion "Monte Baldo" was disbanded after its return from Upper Silesia. The 6th Alpini Regiment then consisted of the following units:

- 6th Alpini Regiment, in Brixen
  - Alpini Battalion "Morbegno"
    - 44th, 45th, and 47th Alpini Company
  - Alpini Battalion "Trento"
    - 94th, 144th, and 145th Alpini Company
  - Alpini Battalion "Edolo"
    - 50th, 51st, and 52nd Alpini Company
  - Alpini Battalion "Vestone"
    - 53rd, 54th, and 55th Alpini Company

The same year the regiment was assigned to the 2nd Alpine Division, which also included the 4th Alpini Regiment, 5th Alpini Regiment, and 3rd Mountain Artillery Regiment. In 1923, the 2nd Alpine Division was replaced by the II Alpini Grouping, which in 1926 was reorganized as II Alpine Brigade. The brigade included, besides the 6th Alpini Regiment, also the 5th Alpini Regiment, 7th Alpini Regiment, and 2nd Mountain Artillery Regiment. In November 1926, the regiment returned the Alpini Battalion "Morbegno" to the 5th Alpini Regiment, and in turn received the Alpini Battalion "Verona" from the 8th Alpini Regiment.

On 1 October 1934, the 6th Alpini Regiment returned the Alpini Battalion "Edolo" to the 5th Alpini Regiment. On 27 October of the same year, the II Alpine Brigade was renamed II Superior Alpine Command. In December of the same year the command was given the name "Tridentino". On 31 October 1935, the II Superior Alpine Command "Tridentino" was reorganized as 2nd Alpine Division "Tridentina", which included the 5th Alpini Regiment, 6th Alpini Regiment, and 2nd Alpine Artillery Regiment "Tridentina". During the same year the regiment moved from Brixen to Sterzing.

=== Second Italo-Ethiopian War ===
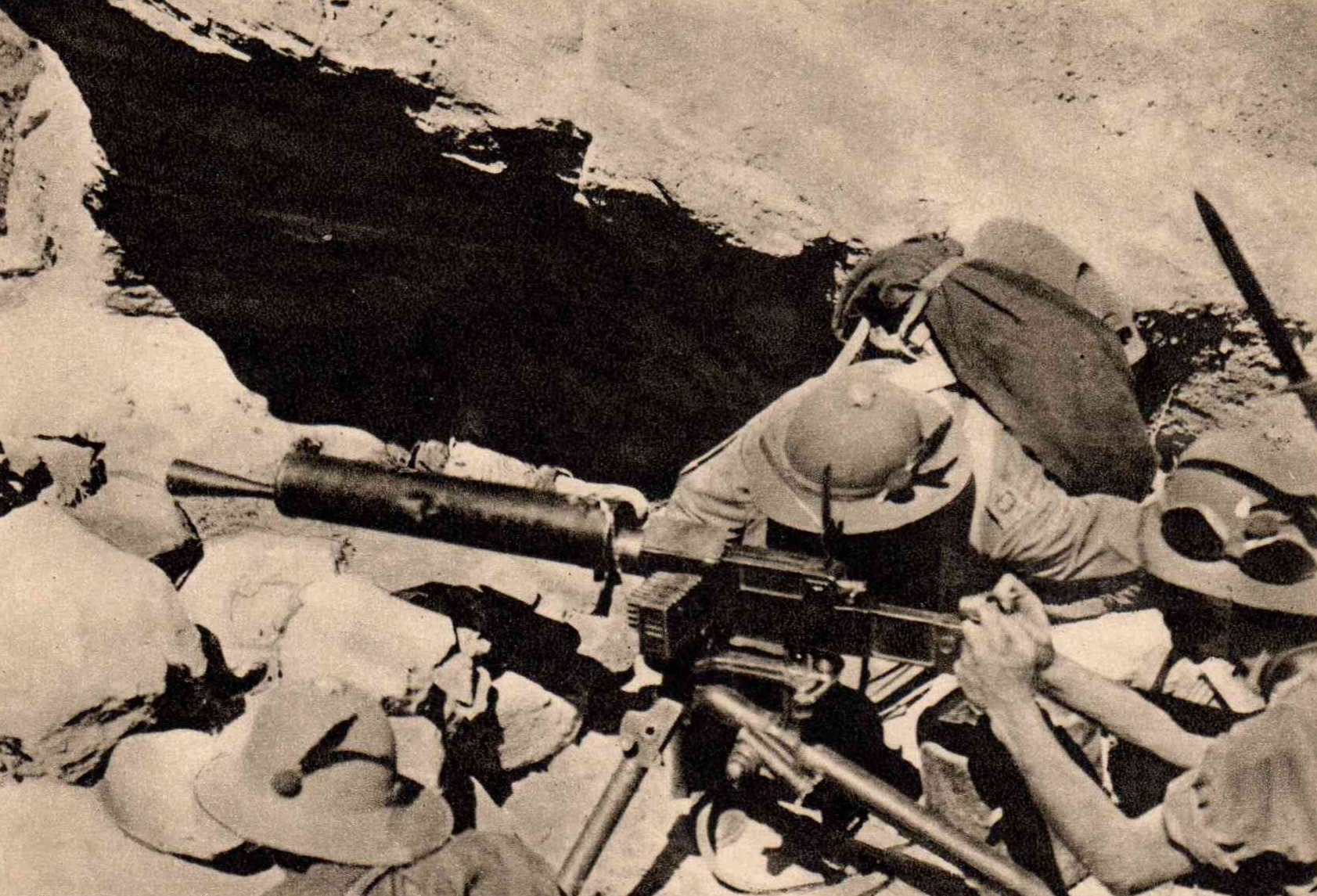
Alpini with a Fiat–Revelli Mod. 1914 machine gun during the Battle of Amba Aradam

On 22 December 1935, the 6th Alpini Regiment transferred the Alpini Battalion "Trento" to the newly formed 11th Alpini Regiment, which on 31 December of the same year was assigned to the newly formed 5th Alpine Division "Pusteria". On 6 January 1936, the "Pusteria" division's units embarked in Livorno and Naples for the transfer to Massawa in Eritrea. On 1 February 1936, the regiment formed the Alpini Battalion "Trento II" as replacement for the battalion fighting in Ethiopia and the 635th Company, which consisted of volunteers and was assigned to the XI Replacements Battalion. The XI Replacements Battalion was attached to 11th Alpini Regiment and shipped to East Africa, where in the meantime the "Pusteria" was engaged in combat against Ethiopian troops. In April 1937, the 11th Alpini Regiment returned to Italy and on 17 April the Alpini Battalion "Trento" was permanently assigned to it. Around the same time the Alpini Battalion "Trento II" was disbanded and its personnel merged into the Alpini Battalion "Trento".

=== World War II ===
On 2 September 1939, one day after the German Invasion of Poland had begun, the Alpini battalions "Val d'Adige" and "Val Chiese" were reformed with reservists and assigned to the 5th Alpini Group. On 10 June 1940, the day Italy entered World War II, the regiment's organization was as follows:

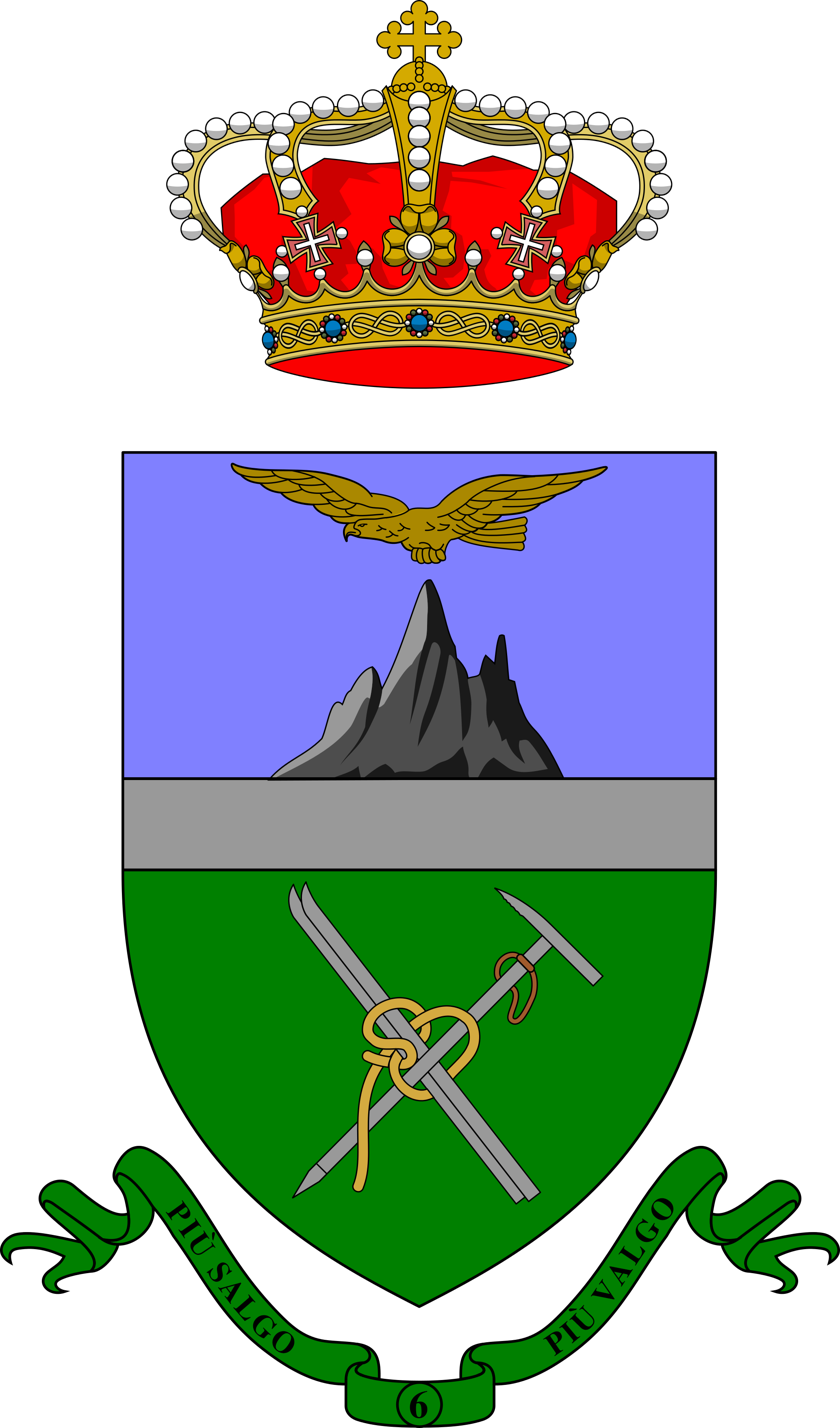
- 6th Alpini Regiment, in Sterzing
  - Regimental Command Company
  - Alpini Battalion "Verona", in Sterzing
    - Command Company
    - 56th, 57th, and 58th Alpini Company
  - Alpini Battalion "Vestone", in Gossensass
    - Command Company
    - 53rd, 54th, and 55th Alpini Company
  - 6th Supply Section
  - 6th Medical Section (includes the 621st Field Hospital)
  - 26th Train Section (equipped with mules)

In June 1940 the regiment participated in the invasion of France. After the Battle of France the Alpini battalions "Val d'Adige" and "Val Chiese" were disbanded on 31 October 1940.

==== Greco-Italian War ====
In November 1940, the 2nd Alpine Division "Tridentina" was transferred to Albania to shore up the crumbling Italian front during the Greco-Italian War. On 18 November 1940, the 6th Alpini Regiment entered the front in the upper Devoll valley. In December 1940, the regiment suffered heavy losses in the Greek counter-offensive. On 2 January 1941, the Alpini Battalion "Val Chiese" was reformed and sent immediately to Albania, where the battalion was assigned as third battalion to the 6th Alpini Regiment. By now the "Tridentina" division had retreated into Albania, where it continued to fight until the German invasion of Greece in April 1941. The "Tridentina" division then pursued the retreating Greek forces to Leskovik and Ersekë. After the war's conclusion the division returned to Italy. For its conduct and service on the Greek front from 14 November 1940 to 21 April 1941 the 6th Alpini Regiment was awarded a Silver Medal of Military Valor, which was affixed to the regiment's flag and added to the regiment's coat of arms.

In December 1941, the regiment formed the XVIII Replacements Battalion, which was assigned to the 7th Alpini Valley Group, which fought Yugoslav partisans in Croatia. On 15 February 1942, the regiment formed a support weapons company for each of its three battalions. These companies were equipped with Breda M37 machine guns, and 45mm Mod. 35 and 81mm Mod. 35 mortars. The 111th Support Weapons Company was assigned to the Alpini Battalion "Vestone", the 112th Support Weapons Company to the Alpini Battalion "Val Chiese", and the 113th Support Weapons Company to the Alpini Battalion "Verona".

==== Eastern Front ====
On 2 March 1942, the 2nd Alpine Division "Tridentina" was assigned, together with the 3rd Alpine Division "Julia" and 4th Alpine Division "Cuneense", to the Alpine Army Corps. The corps was assigned to the Italian 8th Army, which was readied to be deployed in summer 1942 to the Eastern Front. In preparation for the deployment to the Soviet Union the 6th Alpini Regiment's depot formed on 1 April 1942 the 216th Cannons Company, which was equipped with 47/32 mod. 35 anti-tank guns. In May 1942, the XVIII Replacements Battalion was disbanded and its remaining personnel assigned to other Alpini battalions deployed in Croatia.

In June 1942, the depots of the 6th Alpini Regiment formed the VI Replacements Battalion, which consisted of the 634th, 636th, and 638th Alpini companies, and the 406th Support Weapons Company. On 20 June 1942, the VI Replacements Battalion was assigned to the newly formed 102nd Alpini Marching Regiment, which was assigned to the III Marching Brigade of the 8th Marching Division. The division provided replacement troops for the 8th Army's regiments fighting on the Eastern Front.

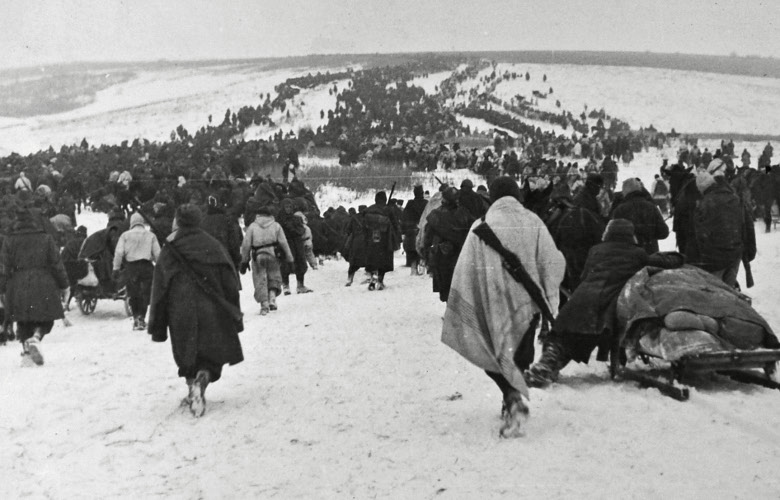
The Alpine Army Corps' retreat in Ukraine in January 1943

In July 1942 the three alpine division arrived in Eastern Ukraine, from where they marched eastwards towards the Don river. The Italian 8th Army covered the left flank of the German 6th Army, which spearheaded the German summer offensive of 1942 towards Stalingrad. On 1 September 1942, the Alpini Battalion "Vestone" assaulted three Soviet-held heights near the Don river, which were taken after a day of bloody fighting. For the successful attack the Alpini Battalion "Vestone" was awarded a Bronze Medal of Military Valor, which was affixed to the 6th Alpini Regiment's flag and added to the regiment's coat of arms. On 12 December 1942, the Red Army commenced Operation Little Saturn, which, in its first stage, attacked and encircled the Italian II Army Corps and XXXV Army Corps, to the southeast of the Alpine Army Corps. On 13 January 1943, the Red Army launched the second stage of Operation Little Saturn with the Voronezh Front encircling and destroying the Hungarian Second Army to the northwest of the Alpine Army Corps.

On the evening of 17 January 1943, the Alpine Army Corps commander, General Gabriele Nasci, ordered a full retreat. At this point only the 2nd Alpine Division "Tridentina" was still capable of conducting combat operations. The 40,000-strong mass of stragglers — Alpini and Italians from other commands, plus German and Hungarians — followed the "Tridentina", which led the way westwards to the new Axis lines. As the Soviets had already occupied every village, bitter battles had to be fought to clear the way. On the morning of 26 January 1943, the spearheads of the "Tridentina' reached the hamlet of Nikolayevka, occupied by the Soviet 48th Guards Rifle Division. The Soviets had fortified the railway embankment on both sides of the village. General Nasci ordered a frontal assault and at 9:30 am the Battle of Nikolayevka began with the 6th Alpini Regiment leading the first attack. By noon the Italian forces had reached the outskirts of the village and the Alpine Army Corps' Chief of Staff General Giulio Martinat led the 5th Alpini Regiment forward for another assault, durich which General Martinat fell. By sunset the Alpini battalions were still struggling to break the Soviet lines and in a last effort to decide the battle before nightfall General Luigi Reverberi, the commanding General of the "Tridentina" division, ordered a human wave attack on the Soviet lines. The attack managed to break through the Soviet lines and the Italians continued their retreat, which was no longer contested by Soviet forces. On 1 February 1943 the remnants of the Alpine Army Corps reached Axis lines.

On 11 February 1943, the survivors were counted and 1,646 men of the regiment had were listed as killed or missing. For its bravery and sacrifice in the Soviet Union the 6th Alpini Regiment was awarded a Gold Medal of Military Valor, which was affixed to the regiment's flag and added to the regiment's coat of arms.

In April 1943, the regiment's depots in Italy reformed the Alpini Battalion "Monte Baldo", which was assigned to the 175th Coastal Alpini Regiment, which was sent during the same month to the occupied French island of Corsica.

The 6th Alpini Regiment was still in the process of being rebuilt, when the Armistice of Cassibile was announced on 8 September 1943. Two days later, on 10 September 1943, the regiment was disbanded by invading German forces. After the announcement of the armistice the Alpini Battalion "Monte Baldo" fought against German forces retreating through Corsica. Afterwards the battalion, along with the rest of the 175th Coastal Alpini Regiment, was transferred to Sardinia, where the battalion "Monte Baldo" was disbanded on 31 August 1944.

=== Cold War ===
On 20 November 1945, the IV Brigade of the 210th Auxiliary Division, which had served with the American Fifth Army during the Italian campaign of World War II, was reorganized in the city of Meran as an Alpini regiment. The IV Brigade consisted of the 505th, 508th, and 514th guard battalions, which were redesignated as I, II, and III Alpini battalions. On 15 December 1945, the three battalions were renamed Alpini Battalion "Bolzano" in Bolzano, Alpini Battalion "Trento" in Meran, and Alpini Battalion "Edolo" in Bruneck. Initially the regiment was designated 4th Alpini Regiment as it had been formed within the area overseen by the IV Territorial Military Command. On 10 April 1946, the regiment was renumbered as 6th Alpini Regiment.

On 1 May 1951, the regiment joined the newly formed Alpine Brigade "Tridentina", which also included the 2nd Mountain Artillery Regiment. On the same day the IV Battalion, of the disbanded Alpine Recruits Training Center in Trento, joined the 6th Alpini Regiment and was renamed Recruits Training Battalion. On 1 June 1951, the regiment reformed the Alpini Battalion "Bassano" in Innichen and on 31 July the regiment formed the 6th Mortar Company. On 31 December 1952, the regiment moved from Meran to Bruneck, as the next day, on 1 January 1953, the 5th Alpini Regiment was reformed in Meran. On the same day the 5th Alpini Regiment joined the newly formed Alpine Brigade "Orobica". On 15 March 1953, the Alpini Battalion "Trento" in Meran and the Alpini Battalion "Edolo" in Bruneck switched names, and the "Edolo" battalion then joined the 5th Alpini Regiment. On 1 September of the same year, the Recruits Training Battalion was transferred from the 6th Alpini Regiment to the 5th Alpini Regiment. In the following years the Alpini Battalion "Bolzano" moved from Bolzano to Brixen and the Alpini Battalion "Trento" from Bruneck to Welsberg. On 31 December 1964, the 6th Mortar Company was split to form a mortar companies for each of the regiment's three battalions. Afterwards the regiment consisted of the following units:

- 6th Alpini Regiment, in Bruneck
  - Command Company, in Bruneck
  - Alpini Battalion "Bolzano", in Brixen
    - Command and Services Company
    - 92nd, 141st, and 142nd Alpini Company
    - 127th Mortar Company
  - Alpini Battalion "Trento", in Welsberg
    - Command and Services Company
    - 94th, 144th, and 145th Alpini Company
    - 128th Mortar Company
  - Alpini Battalion "Bassano", in Innichen
    - Command and Services Company
    - 62nd, 63rd, and 74th Alpini Company
    - 129th Mortar Company

During the 1975 army reform the army disbanded the regimental level and newly independent battalions were granted for the first time their own flags. On 1 September 1975, the Alpini Battalion "Bolzano" was reduced to a reserve unit. On 30 September 1975, the 6th Alpini Regiment was disbanded and the next day the regiment's two active battalions became autonomous units and were assigned to the Alpine Brigade "Tridentina". The Alpini battalions "Trento" and "Bassano" consisted now of a command, a command and services company, three Alpini companies, and a heavy mortar company with eight 120mm Mod. 63 mortars. Each of the two Alpini battalions fielded now 950 men (45 officers, 96 non-commissioned officers, and 809 soldiers).

On 12 November 1976 the President of the Italian Republic Giovanni Leone assigned with decree 846 the flag and traditions of the 6th Alpini Regiment to the Alpini Battalion "Bassano" and the flag and traditions of the 11th Alpini Regiment to the Alpini Battalion "Trento". At the same time the medals and military honors awarded to the Alpini Battalion "Trento" were transferred from the flag of the 6th Alpini Regiment to the flag of the 11th Alpini Regiment.

=== Recent times ===
In 1992 the "Tridentina" brigade's Anti-Tank Company was disbanded and its personnel, with their TOW anti-tank guided missiles, assigned to the mortar companies of the Alpini Battalion "Bassano" and the Alpini battalion of the 11th Alpini Regiment. Consequently, the "Bassano" battalion's 129th Mortar Company was renamed 129th Support Weapons Company. On 14 January 1993, the Alpini Battalion "Bassano" lost its autonomy and the next day the battalion entered the reformed 6th Alpini Regiment. In November 1994 the regiment was sent to the Province of Asti, which had been inundated by severe floods. For its work in Asti the Italian Red Cross awarded the 6th Alpini Regiment a Bronze Medal of Merit, which was affixed to the regiment's flag.

In 2001 the 129th Support Weapons Company was split into the 129th Mortar Company and the 259th Anti-tank Company "Val Leogra". On 18 March 2002, the 11th Alpini Regiment was disbanded and its remaining personnel merged into the 6th Alpini Regiment. On 31 December 2002, the Alpine Brigade "Tridentina" was disbanded and the next day the 6th Alpini Regiment was assigned to the Alpine Troops Command. Over the following years the regiment was reorganized as a NATO-wide mountain warfare training regiment. The regiment also moved its headquarter from Innichen to Bruneck and took over the administration of the military training sites in Bruneck, Innichen, and Toblach, which are all located in the Puster Valley. On 1 January 2009, the regiment was transferred from the Alpine Troops Command to the Alpine Training Center.

== Organization ==
As of 2024 the 6th Alpini Regiment is organized as follows:

- 6th Alpini Regiment, in Bruneck
  - Command and Logistic Support Company
  - Alpini Battalion "Bassano"
    - 62nd Alpini Company
    - 74th Training Company, in Innichen
