= Antonio Cantore =

Italian general

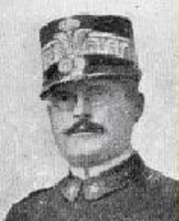
Antonio Cantore

Antonio Cantore (4 August 1860 – 20 July 1915) was an Italian general.

== Biography ==
Born at Sampierdarena, in Genoa, he fought as commander of the 8th Special Alpini Regiment in the Italo-Turkish War taking place in Libya. At his return to Italy 1914, he was promoted to major general. During World War I, when in command of the 2nd Infantry Division, he died during a reconnaissance mission at Tofana di Rozes, and was awarded the gold medal for military valour. His tomb lies at the Sacrario militare di Pocol in the comune of Cortina d'Ampezzo in northern Italy.
