= List of military weapons of Italy =

This is a list of all weapons ever used by the Italian Army. This list will go in chronological order so from earliest weapons to the present ones used by the Italian Army

== World War II ==
- List of Italian Army equipment in World War II

== Cold War ==
- List of Cold War weapons and land equipment of Italy

== Present ==
- List of equipment of the Italian Army
