= List of Cold War weapons and land equipment of Italy =

This is a list of Italian equipment of the Cold War primarily the Italian Army. Note the main role of the Italian Army in the Cold War period was to protect Southern Europe from an attack from Yugoslavia.

== Small arms ==
=== Rifles ===
- M1 Garand- Used immediately post War till 1959.Was manufactured in Italy with American help.
- Beretta BM 59-Italian improved M14 with select fire.
- Beretta AR70- Modern rifle for its time in 5.56 introduced 1972.

=== Sidearms ===
- Beretta M1934- This weapon had an amazingly long service life in the Italian army only being replaced in 1981.
- Beretta 92S- Adopted in 1981 to replace obsolete M1934. Later variant Beretta M9 similarly replaced the long-lived M1911 pistol in US service.

=== Machine guns ===
- MG42/59- Italian made MG 3 machine gun

=== Submachine guns ===
- Franchi LF-57- An extremely small number made for Navy and the Target Acquisition Group of the 3rd Missile Brigade (GRACO).

=== Anti-tank weapons ===
- Breda Folgore

== Artillery ==
=== Mountain artillery ===
- OTO Melara Mod 56- From Italian company OTO Melara today famous for making naval Weapons and Italian AFV's.

=== Heavy artillery ===
- FH70

=== Self propelled ===
- M44 self-propelled howitzer
- M107 self-propelled gun
- M109 howitzer

== Armoured fighting vehicles (AFVs) ==
=== Tanks ===
- M26 Pershing- used immediately post World War II as frontline tank
- M46 Patton- used temporarily until M47 Patton could be sent
- M47 Patton-Main Italian MBT from 1952 to 1970.
- M60 tank-Replaced M47 saw service till end of Cold War
- Leopard 1- used alongside M60.

=== APCs ===
- M113 armored personnel carrier
