= Italian Army =

Land warfare branch of Italy's military forces

- Esercito Italiano
- Coat of arms of the Italian Army
- Founded: 18 June 1946 (80 years, 4 months)
- Country: Italy
- Type: Army
- Role: Land warfare
- Size: 98,310 (2024)
- Part of: Italian Armed Forces
- Garrison/HQ: Rome
- Mottos: Latin: Salus Rei Publicae Suprema Lex Esto "The safeguard of the republic shall be the supreme law"
- March: 4 Maggio (4 May) by Fulvio Creux
- Anniversaries: 4 November, National Unity and Armed Forces Day; 4 May, Army Day
- Engagements: Risorgimento; War of 1866; Italo-Ethiopian War of 1887–1889; Mahdist War; First Italo-Abyssinian War; Boxer Rebellion; Italy-Somali War; Italo-Turkish War; World War I Second Italo-Abyssinian War; Spanish Civil War; Italian invasion of Albania; World War II; Gulf War; Kosovo War; 1999 East Timorese crisis Global War on Terrorism: Iraq War; War in Afghanistan
- Decorations: 4× Military Order of Italy; 2× Gold Medals of Military Valor; 4× Gold Medals of Civil Valor; 1× Silver Medal of Civil Valor; 4× Gold Medals of Civil Merit; 1× Silver Medal of Civil Merit; 1× Italian Red Cross Gold Medal of Merit; 1× Public Health Gold Medal of Merit; 1× Civil Protection Bronze Medal of Public Merit

Commanders
- President of Italy: Sergio Mattarella
- Chief of Staff: Generale di Corpo d'Armata; Carmine Masiello
- Notable commanders: Giuseppe Garibaldi; Luigi Cadorna; Armando Diaz; Emanuele Filiberto, 2nd Duke of Aosta; Enrico Caviglia; Pietro Badoglio; Giovanni Messe

Insignia
- Logo

- Wordmark

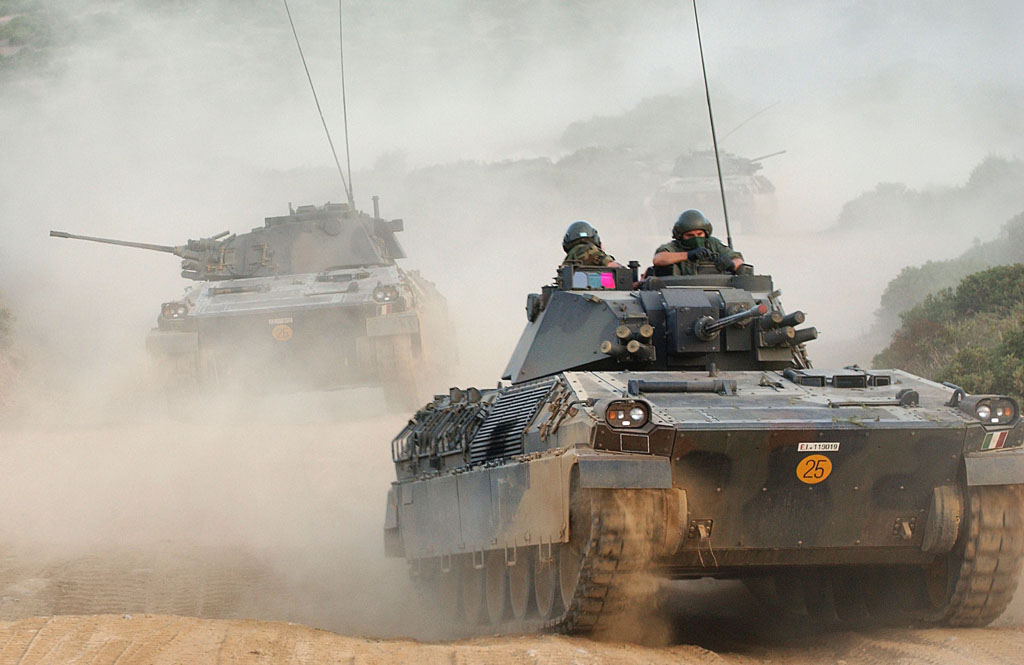
Dardo IFVs on an exercise in Capo Teulada

The Italian Army (Italian: Esercito Italiano [EI]) is the land force branch of the Italian Armed Forces. The army's history dates back to the Italian unification in the 1850s and 1860s. The army fought in colonial engagements in China and Libya. It fought in Northern Italy against the Austro-Hungarian Empire during World War I, Abyssinia before World War II and in World War II in Albania, Balkans, North Africa, the Soviet Union, and Italy itself. During the Cold War, the army prepared itself to defend against a Warsaw Pact invasion from the east. Since the end of the Cold War, the army has seen extensive peacekeeping service and combat in Afghanistan and Iraq. Its best-known combat vehicles are the Dardo infantry fighting vehicle, the Centauro tank destroyer and the Ariete tank and among its aircraft the Mangusta attack helicopter, recently deployed in UN missions. The headquarters of the Army General Staff are located in Rome opposite the Quirinal Palace, where the president of Italy resides. The army is an all-volunteer force of active-duty personnel.

== History ==
The Italian Army originated as the Royal Army (Regio Esercito), which dates from the proclamation of the Kingdom of Italy following the seizure of the Papal States and the unification of Italy (Risorgimento). In 1861, under the leadership of Giuseppe Garibaldi, Victor Emmanuel II of the House of Savoy was invited to take the throne and of the newly created kingdom.

The first war it fought was the Third Italian War of Independence, which resulted in an Italian victory and the liberation of much of eastern Italy.

Italian expeditions were dispatched to China during the Boxer Rebellion of 1900 and to Libya during the Italo-Turkish War of 1911–1912.

=== World War I ===
The Italian Royal Army's first real taste of modern warfare was during World War I. Most of the actions were fought in northern Italy, and the Royal Army suffered many casualties. This included over 700,000 dead. In particular, the frequency of the offensives in which Italian soldiers participated between May 1915 and August 1917, one every three months, was higher than demanded by the armies on the Western Front. Italian discipline was also harsher, with punishments for infractions of duty of a severity not known in the German, French, and British armies.

Nevertheless it performed well during World War 1, as even though Italy was the least supported of the three main Entente powers, the fact the Italians managed to hold the line until late 1917 meant that the industry reached the level that it could outproduce the invader, giving the Italian army the advantage of an excellent air force, and this, coupled with the advantage in artillery, and a higher level of tactical prowess compared to their enemy resulted in 1918 in the biggest Italian victories of the war, the Second Battle of the Piave, where the Italians stopped the biggest Triple Alliance attack of the Italian front, and the Battle of Vittorio Veneto, in which Italy totally destroyed the Austro-Hungarian army and so Italy's victory over the Hasburgs was stipulated on 4 November 1918, at the Villafranca Armistice.

During the Interwar Years the Royal Army participated in the Italian Invasion of Ethiopia, provided men and materials during the Spanish Civil War to fight in the Corps of Volunteer Troops (Corpo Truppe Volontarie), and launched the Italian invasion of Albania.

=== World War II ===
On paper, the Royal Army was one of the largest ground forces in World War II, and it was one of the pioneers in using paratroopers. In reality, it could not field the numbers claimed. Due to their generally smaller size, many Italian divisions were reinforced by an Assault Group (Gruppo d'Assalto) of two battalions of Blackshirts (MVSN).

Reports of Italian military prowess in the Second World War were almost always dismissive. This perception was the result of disastrous Italian offensives against Egypt and the performance of the army in the Greco-Italian War. Both campaigns were ill-prepared and executed inadequately. The Italian 10th Army initially advanced into Egypt but surrendered after being pushed back into central Libya and almost all destroyed by British forces a fifth its size during the three-month Operation Compass.

The less than optimal military leadership was aggravated by the Italian military's equipment, which predominantly dated back to the First World War and was not up to the standard of either the Allied or the German armies. Italian medium tanks performed very differently depending on level of training and tank type, M11 performed badly because of its outdated doctrine, while the M13 and M14 performed well after many changes to tactics, it was the center of all Italian armored victories like at the First Battle of Bir El Gobi and the Battle of Gazala, while the later M15 was outdated for the tanks it had to face by the time of its entry into service, for example. More crucially, Italy lacked suitable quantities of equipment of all kinds, and the Italian high command did not take the necessary steps to plan for possible battlefield setbacks or proper logistical support to its field armies. There were too few anti-aircraft weapons, obsolete anti-tank guns, and too few trucks.

The Italian Expeditionary Corps in Russia fought under General Giovanni Messe, who acknowledged the limitations of his Corps in material and equipment and thus was relieved of his command on 1 November 1942. When the Soviet offensive Operation Saturn began on 12 December 1942 the Italian 8th Army was quickly crushed. Only about a third of its troops managed to escape the Soviet cauldron, including from the three Alpini Divisions Tridentina, Julia and Cuneense.

In North Africa, the Italian 132nd Armored Division "Ariete" and the 185th Infantry Division "Folgore" fought to total annihilation at the Second Battle of El Alamein. Although the battle was lost, the determined resistance of the Italian soldiers at the Battle of Keren in East Africa is still commemorated today by the Italian military.

After the Axis defeat in Tunisia, the morale of the Italian troops dropped. Once the Allies landed in Sicily on 10 July 1943, most Italian Coastal divisions simply dissolved. The sagging morale led to the overthrow of Italian dictator Benito Mussolini by King Victor Emmanuel III of Italy 15 days later.

In September 1943, Italy made an armistice with the Allies, after this Germany invaded Italy, split into the Italian Social Republic – effectively a puppet state of Germany – in the north and that of the Badoglio government in the south. The Italian Co-Belligerent Army (Esercito Cobelligerante Italiano) was the army of the Italian royalist forces fighting on the side of the Allies in southern Italy after the Allied armistice with Italy in September 1943. The Italian soldiers fighting in this army no longer fought for Benito Mussolini as their allegiance was to King Victor Emmanuel and to Marshal of Italy (Maresciallo d'Italia) Pietro Badoglio, the men who ousted Mussolini.

=== Cold War ===
Following the 2 June 1946 Italian institutional referendum, on 10 June the kingdom was replaced by a Republic, and the Royal Army changed its name to become the Italian Army ("Esercito Italiano"). Initially, the army fielded five infantry divisions, created from the five combat groups of the Italian Co-belligerent Army and equipped with British material. Additionally the army fielded three internal security divisions without heavy equipment to garrison the country's two major islands:

- Infantry Division "Cremona", in Turin (formerly part of British V Corps)
- Infantry Division "Folgore", Florence (formerly part of British XIII Corps)
- Infantry Division "Friuli", in Bolzano (formerly part of Polish II Corps)
- Infantry Division "Legnano", in Bergamo (formerly part of Polish II Corps)
- Infantry Division "Mantova", in Varazze (formerly part of British Eighth Army)
- Internal Security Division "Aosta", in Palermo on Sicily
- Internal Security Division "Sabauda", in Enna on Sicily
- Internal Security Division "Calabria", in Sassari on Sardinia

As the status of the city of Free Territory of Trieste was disputed by the Socialist Federal Republic of Yugoslavia the Italian army moved the Infantry Division "Folgore" to Treviso and the Infantry Division "Mantova" to Gorizia in 1947. At the same time, the army began training an additional seven divisions and five Alpini brigades.

- Infantry Division "Aosta", in Messina (activated 1 February 1948)
- Infantry Division "Granatieri di Sardegna", in Civitavecchia (activated 1 April 1948)
- Infantry Division "Avellino", in Salerno (at reduced strength) (activated 1 September 1949)
- Alpine Brigade "Julia", in Cividale del Friuli (activated 15 October 1949)
- Infantry Division "Trieste", in Bologna (activated 1 June 1950)
- Alpine Brigade "Tridentina", in Bressanone (activated 1 May 1951)
- Infantry Division "Pinerolo", in Bari (at reduced strength) (activated 15 April 1952)
- Alpine Brigade "Taurinense", in Turin (activated 15 April 1952)
- Armored Division "Ariete", in Pordenone (activated 1 October 1952)
- Armored Division "Centauro", in Verona (activated 1 November 1952)
- Alpine Brigade "Orobica", in Merano (activated 1 January 1953)
- Armored Division "Pozzuolo del Friuli", in Rome (activated 1 January 1953)
- Alpine Brigade "Cadore", in Belluno (activated 1 July 1953)

Following the creation of NATO, the Italian Army was integrated into NATO's Allied Forces Southern Europe and prepared for a feared invasion from the east, possibly via Yugoslavia. Allied Land Forces Southern Europe (LANDSOUTH), was activated on 10 July 1951 to defend northeastern Italy. The command was headquartered at Verona, and placed under Lieutenant General Maurizio Lazzaro De Castiglioni. Some three infantry divisions and three brigades were the only forces initially available to this command to defend northeastern Italy. The divisions in question were the Infantry Division "Mantova" in Gorizia, the Infantry Division "Folgore" in Treviso, the Infantry Division "Trieste" in Bologna. Two of the three brigades were Alpini mountain infantry brigades – the Alpine Brigade "Julia" in Cividale del Friuli and Alpine Brigade "Tridentina" in Brixen, while the third brigade was the Armored Brigade "Ariete" in Pordenone. Exercise "Italic Weld", a combined air-naval-ground exercise in northern Italy involving the United States, Italy, Turkey, and Greece, appears to have been one of the first exercises in which the new Italian Army orientation was tested.

On 1 May 1952 the army activated one army command and two corps commands, the Third Army in Padua, and the IV Army Corps in Bolzano and V Army Corps in Vittorio Veneto, to be able to circumvent NATO's chain of command in case a war should break out between Italy and Yugoslavia for the Free Territory of Trieste. Later in 1952 the army also raised the VI Army Corps in Bologna, followed by the III Army Corps in Milan in 1957, both of which were also assigned to the Third Army.

During the early 1960s the army reduced the "Trieste", "Friuli", "Pozzuolo del Friuli", "Pinerolo", "Avellino", and "Aosta" divisions to brigades and raised the I Paratroopers Brigade in Pisa. On 1 October 1965, the Infantry Brigade "Avellino" was disbanded and, on 10 June 1967, the 1st Paratroopers Brigade was allowed to add "Folgore" to its name. It was now named Paratroopers Brigade "Folgore". With the easing of tensions between Italy and Yugoslavia, the Third Army, along with VI Army Corps, was disbanded on 1 April 1972, and its functions were taken over by NATO's Allied Forces Southern Europe in Verona. Before the disbanding of Third Army the army's structure was as follows:

- Third Army, in Padua
  - Anti-aircraft Artillery Command, in Padua
  - III Army Corps, in Milan
    - Armored Division "Centauro", in Novara
    - Infantry Division "Legnano", in Bergamo
    - Infantry Division "Cremona", in Cuneo
    - Alpine Brigade "Taurinense", in Turin (transferred to IV Army Corps in 1972)
  - IV Army Corps, in Bolzano (renamed IV Alpine Army Corps on 1 January 1973)
    - Alpine Brigade "Orobica", in Merano
    - Alpine Brigade "Tridentina", in Bressanone
    - Carnia-Cadore Troops Command, in Belluno
      - Alpine Brigade "Cadore", in Belluno
      - Alpine Brigade "Julia", in Cividale del Friuli
  - V Army Corps, in Vittorio Veneto
    - Armored Division "Ariete", in Pordenone
    - Infantry Division "Folgore", in Treviso
    - Infantry Division "Mantova", in Udine
    - Cavalry Brigade "Pozzuolo del Friuli", in Gorizia (a division-sized, armored formation)
    - III Missile Brigade, in Portogruaro (armed with nuclear Honest John missiles)
    - Trieste Troops Command, in Trieste
    - Lagunari Regiment "Serenissima", in Venice (a brigade-sized formation)
  - VI Army Corps, in Bologna
    - Infantry Brigade "Friuli", in Florence
    - Infantry Brigade "Trieste", in Bologna
    - Paratroopers Brigade "Folgore", in Pisa
- Army General Staff, in Rome
  - I Military Territorial Command, in Turin
  - V Military Territorial Command, in Padua
  - VII Military Territorial Command, in Florence
  - VIII Military Territorial Command, Rome
    - Infantry Division "Granatieri di Sardegna", in Rome
    - Sardinia Military Command, in Cagliari
  - X Military Territorial Command, in Naples
    - Infantry Brigade "Pinerolo", in Bari
  - XI Military Territorial Command, in Palermo
    - Infantry Brigade "Aosta", in Messina

==== 1975 reform ====
The most significant reorganization of the Italian Army took place in 1975, when the regimental level was abolished and battalions came under direct command of newly formed multi-arms brigades. At the same time, the reduction of the military service from 15 to 12 months for the army and air force and from 24 to 18 months for the navy forced the army to reduce its forces by nearly 45,000 troops. Therefore, while in the existing brigades "Orobica", "Tridentina", "Cadore", "Julia", "Taurinense", "Friuli", "Trieste", "Folgore", "Pinerolo", "Aosta" and "III Missile Brigade" only the regimental level was abolished, the divisions and "Pozzuolo del Friuli" brigade were subjected to major changes:

While the Infantry Division "Cremona" was reduced to a brigade, the Infantry Division "Granatieri di Sardegna" and Infantry Division "Legnano" and the Cavalry Brigade "Pozzuolo del Friuli" were split to create two new brigades each. Afterwards, the three units ceased to exist.

Before 1975	After 1975	Notes
Infantry Division "Cremona"	Motorized Brigade "Cremona"	assigned to 3rd Army Corps
Infantry Division "Granatieri di Sardegna"	Mechanized Brigade "Granatieri di Sardegna"	assigned to Central Military Region
Infantry Division "Granatieri di Sardegna"	Motorized Brigade "Acqui"	assigned to Central Military Region
Infantry Division "Legnano"	Mechanized Brigade "Legnano"	joined the Armored Division "Centauro"
Infantry Division "Legnano"	Mechanized Brigade "Brescia"	joined the Mechanized Division "Mantova"
Cavalry Brigade "Pozzuolo del Friuli"	Armored Brigade "Pozzuolo del Friuli"	joined the Mechanized Division "Mantova"
Cavalry Brigade "Pozzuolo del Friuli"	Armored Brigade "Vittorio Veneto"	joined the Mechanized Division "Folgore"

The remaining four divisions were also subjected to major changes and reductions, however, unlike the above three divisions, they remained in service after the reform. The units of the Infantry Division "Folgore" and Infantry Division "Mantova" were mostly disbanded, and the remnants used to create one brigade each; then each of the two divisions was augmented with two brigades to bring them back up to strength. The 131st Armored Division "Centauro" was split into two brigades and then brought back to full strength by adding the Mechanized Brigade "Legnano". Only the 132nd Armored Division "Ariete" saw no reduction in its ranks, and its three regiments were used to create three brigades for the division.

Name before 1975	Brigades created from divisional assets in 1975	Name after 1975	Assigned brigades after 1975	Notes
Infantry Division "Folgore"	Mechanized Brigade "Gorizia"	Mechanized Division "Folgore"	Mechanized Brigade "Gorizia"	
Infantry Division "Folgore"	Mechanized Brigade "Gorizia"	Mechanized Division "Folgore"	Mechanized Brigade "Trieste"	from the Tuscan-Emilian Military Region
Infantry Division "Folgore"	Mechanized Brigade "Gorizia"	Mechanized Division "Folgore"	Armored Brigade "Vittorio Veneto"	split from the Cavalry Brigade "Pozzuolo del Friuli"
Infantry Division "Mantova"	Mechanized Brigade "Isonzo"	Mechanized Division "Mantova"	Mechanized Brigade "Isonzo"	
Infantry Division "Mantova"	Mechanized Brigade "Isonzo"	Mechanized Division "Mantova"	Mechanized Brigade "Brescia"	split from the Infantry Division "Legnano"
Infantry Division "Mantova"	Mechanized Brigade "Isonzo"	Mechanized Division "Mantova"	Armored Brigade "Pozzuolo del Friuli"	from the 5th Army Corps
Armored Division "Centauro"	31st Armored Brigade "Curtatone"; 3rd Mechanized Brigade "Goito"	Armored Division "Centauro"	31st Armored Brigade "Curtatone"	
Armored Division "Centauro"	31st Armored Brigade "Curtatone"; 3rd Mechanized Brigade "Goito"	Armored Division "Centauro"	3rd Mechanized Brigade "Goito"	
Armored Division "Centauro"	31st Armored Brigade "Curtatone"; 3rd Mechanized Brigade "Goito"	Armored Division "Centauro"	Mechanized Brigade "Legnano"	former Infantry Division "Legnano"
Armored Division "Ariete"	8th Mechanized Brigade "Garibaldi"; 32nd Armored Brigade "Mameli"; 132nd Armored Brigade "Manin"	Armored Division "Ariete"	8th Mechanized Brigade "Garibaldi"	
Armored Division "Ariete"	8th Mechanized Brigade "Garibaldi"; 32nd Armored Brigade "Mameli"; 132nd Armored Brigade "Manin"	Armored Division "Ariete"	32nd Armored Brigade "Mameli"	
Armored Division "Ariete"	8th Mechanized Brigade "Garibaldi"; 32nd Armored Brigade "Mameli"; 132nd Armored Brigade "Manin"	Armored Division "Ariete"	132nd Armored Brigade "Manin"	

After the reform the organization of the army was:

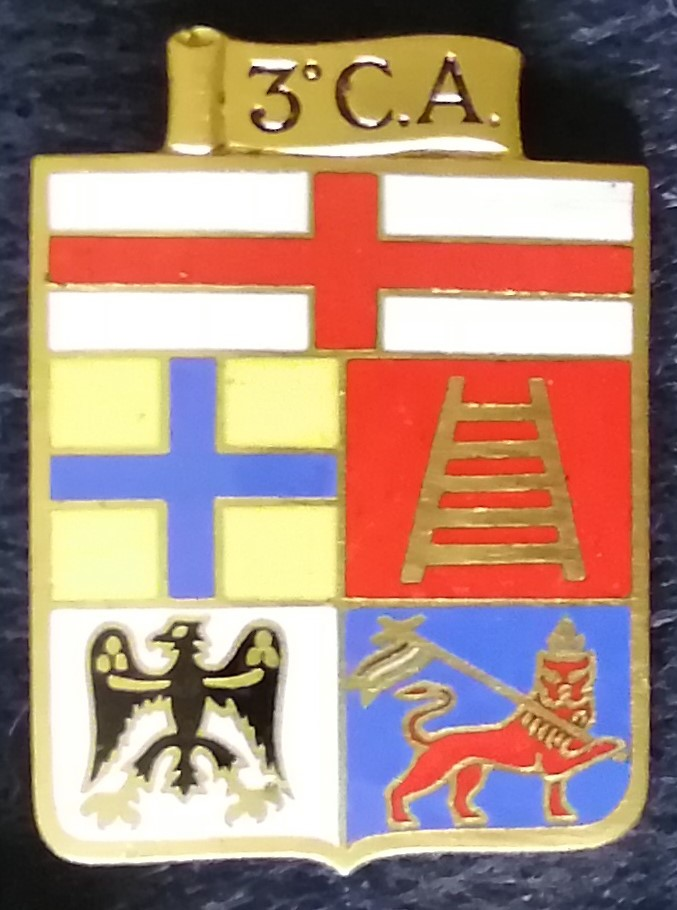
- Badge of the 3rd Army Corps (IT)
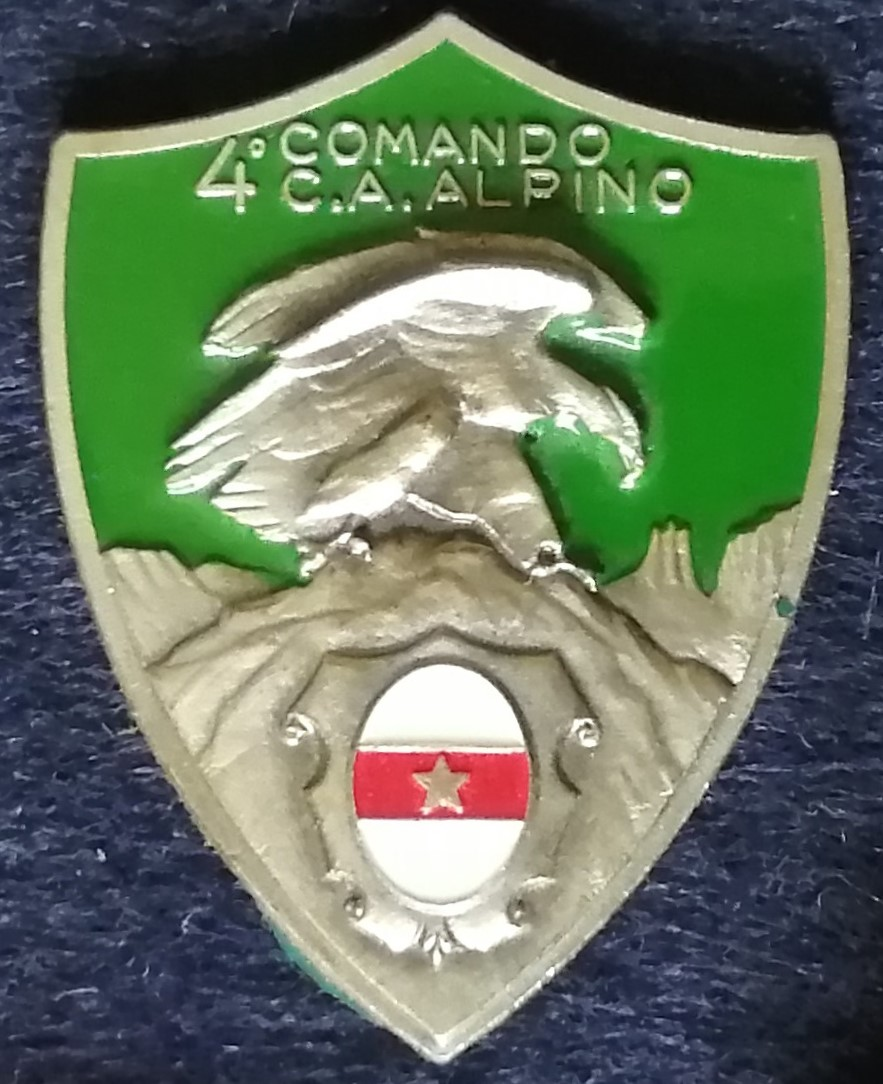
  Badge of the 4th Army Corps (IT)
  3rd Army Corps (Milan):
  - Armored Division "Centauro" (Novara)
    - 3rd Mechanized Brigade "Goito" (Milan)
    - Mechanized Brigade "Legnano" (Bergamo)
    - 31st Armored Brigade "Curtatone" (Bellinzago Novarese)
  - Motorized Brigade "Cremona" (Turin)
- 4th Alpine Army Corps (Bolzano):
  - Alpine Brigade "Cadore" (Belluno)
  - Alpine Brigade "Julia" (Udine)
  - Alpine Brigade "Orobica" (Merano)
  - Alpine Brigade "Taurinense" (Turin)
  - Alpine Brigade "Tridentina" (Brixen)
- 5th Army Corps (Vittorio Veneto):
  - Armored Division "Ariete" (Pordenone)
    - 8th Mechanized Brigade "Garibaldi" (Pordenone)
    - 32nd Armored Brigade "Mameli" (Tauriano)
    - 132nd Armored Brigade "Manin" (Aviano)
  - Mechanized Division "Folgore" (Treviso)
    - Mechanized Brigade "Trieste" (Bologna)
    - Mechanized Brigade "Gorizia" (Gorizia)
    - Armored Brigade "Vittorio Veneto" (Villa Opicina)
    - Amphibious Troops Command (Venice, a regiment-sized formation, tasked with the defence of the Venetian Lagoon)
  - Mechanized Division "Mantova" (Udine)
    - Mechanized Brigade "Brescia" (Brescia)
    - Mechanized Brigade "Isonzo" (Cividale del Friuli)
    - Armored Brigade "Pozzuolo del Friuli" (Palmanova)
  - 3rd Missile Brigade "Aquileia" (Portogruaro)
  - Trieste Troops Command, (Trieste, a brigade-sized formation consisting mostly of reserve units)

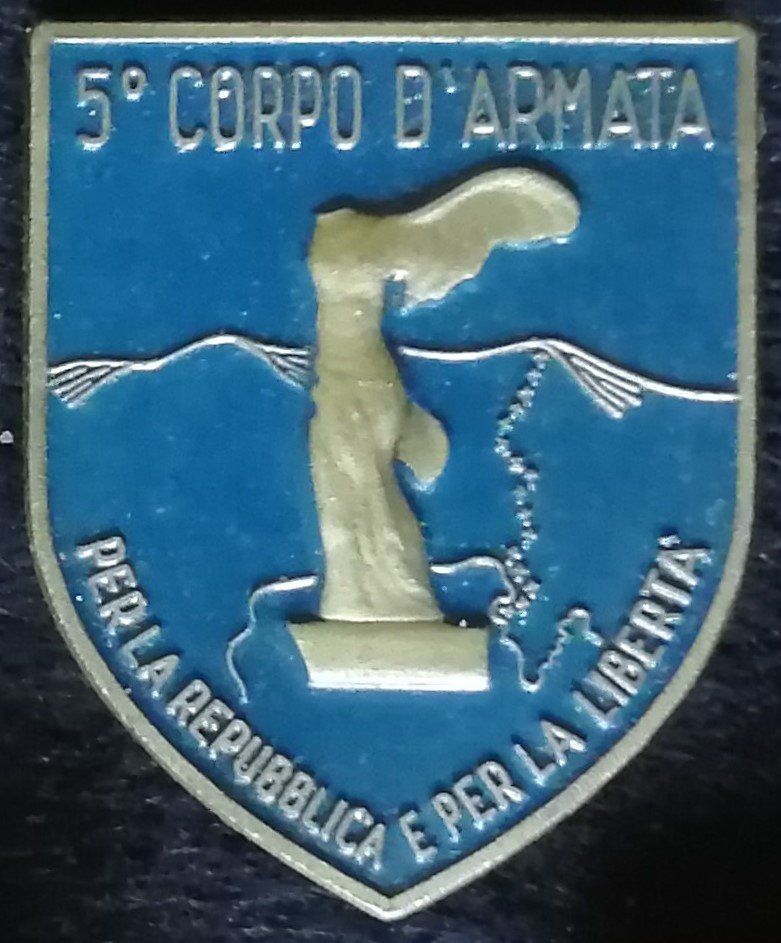
Badge of the 5th Army Corps (IT)

The brigades under operational control of the Military Regions were:

- VII Territorial Military Command (Florence)
  - Paratroopers Brigade "Folgore" (Livorno)
  - Motorized Brigade "Friuli" (Florence)
- VIII Territorial Military Command (Rome)
  - Motorized Brigade "Acqui" (L'Aquila)
  - Mechanized Brigade "Granatieri di Sardegna" (Rome)
- X Territorial Military Command (Naples)
  - Motorized Brigade "Pinerolo" (Bari)
- XI Territorial Military Command (Palermo)
  - Motorized Brigade "Aosta" (Messina)

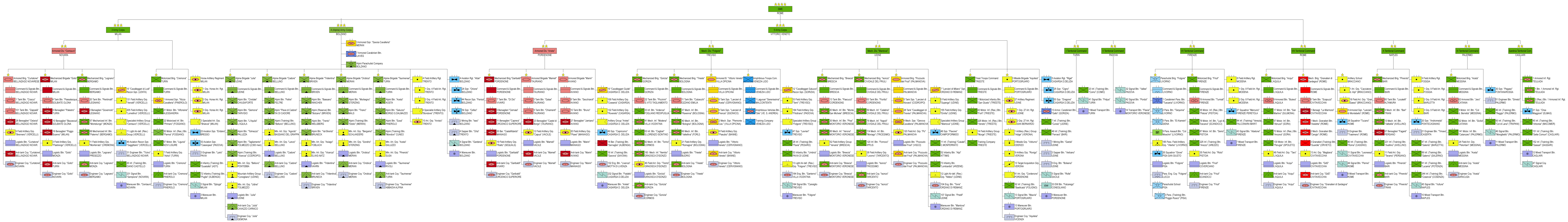
Structure of the Italian Army in 1984

==== 1986 reform ====
In 1986 the remaining four divisional headquarters were dissolved and all brigades in Northern Italy came under direct command of the Army's three Army Corps, while the brigades in Central and Southern Italy came under operational control of the local administrative Military Regions. With the disappearance of the divisions the army renamed some of the divisional brigades and granted all of them a new coat of arms to reflect their new independence. By 1989 the army was structured as depicted in the graphic below:

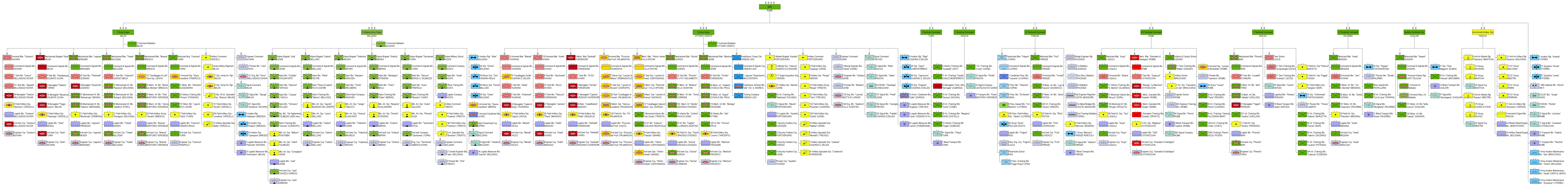
Structure of the Italian Army in 1989

=== End of the Cold War in 1989 ===
Combat brigade locations of the Italian Army in 1989

At the end of the Cold War in 1989 the Italian Army consisted of 26 Combat Brigades: four Armored Brigades, ten Mechanized Brigades, five Motorized Brigades, five Alpine Brigades, one paratroopers Brigade and one Rocket Artillery Brigade.

The units were placed as follows under the three Army Corps's:

- 3rd Army Corps (Milan):
  - Armored Brigade "Centauro" (Novara)
  - Mechanized Brigade "Goito" (Milan)
  - Mechanized Brigade "Legnano" (Bergamo)
  - Mechanized Brigade "Brescia" (Brescia)
  - Mechanized Brigade "Trieste" (Bologna)
  - Motorized Brigade "Cremona" (Turin)
- 4th Alpine Army Corps (Bolzano):
  - Alpine Brigade "Cadore" (Belluno)
  - Alpine Brigade "Julia" (Udine)
  - Alpine Brigade "Orobica" (Merano)
  - Alpine Brigade "Taurinense" (Turin)
  - Alpine Brigade "Tridentina" (Brixen)
- 5th Army Corps (Vittorio Veneto):
  - 132nd Armored Brigade "Ariete" (Aviano)
  - Armored Brigade "Mameli" (Tauriano)
  - Armored Brigade "Pozzuolo del Friuli" (Palmanova)
  - 8th Mechanized Brigade "Garibaldi" (Pordenone)
  - Mechanized Brigade "Vittorio Veneto" (Villa Opicina)
  - Mechanized Brigade "Gorizia" (Gorizia)
  - Mechanized Brigade "Mantova" (Udine)
  - 3rd Missile Brigade "Aquileia" (Portogruaro)

The brigades under operational control of the Military Regions were:

- VII Territorial Military Command (Florence)
  - Paratroopers Brigade "Folgore" (Livorno)
  - Motorized Brigade "Friuli" (Florence)
- VIII Territorial Military Command (Rome)
  - Motorized Brigade "Acqui" (L'Aquila)
  - Mechanized Brigade "Granatieri di Sardegna" (Rome)
- X Territorial Military Command (Naples)
  - Mechanized Brigade "Pinerolo" (Bari)
- XI Territorial Military Command (Palermo)
  - Motorized Brigade "Aosta" (Messina)
- Autonomous Military Command Sardinia (Cagliari)
  - Motorized Brigade "Sassari" (Sassari)

The armored brigades consisted of one command & signals battalion, two or three tank battalions with Leopard 1A2 tanks, one mechanized infantry battalion with M113 APCs, one self-propelled field artillery group with M109 howitzers, one logistic battalion, an anti-tank company and an engineer company.

The Mechanized Brigades consisted of one command & signals battalion, one Tank Battalion (Leopard 1), three mechanized infantry battalions (M113), one Self-propelled Field Artillery Battalion with M109 howitzers, one logistic battalion, an Anti-Tank Company and an Engineer Company; however, the Pinerolo Mechanized Brigades fielded a Field Artillery Group with FH-70 howitzers. Additionally, the "Gorizia" and "Mantova" mechanized brigades fielded two Position Infantry battalions each, which were tasked with manning fortifications and bunkers along the Yugoslav-Italian border.

The Motorized Brigades consisted of one command & signals battalion, one armored battalion (a mixed unit of tanks and mechanized infantry), three motorized infantry battalions, one Field Artillery Group (FH-70), one logistic battalion, an Anti-Tank Company and an Engineer Company; however, the Sassari Brigade did not contain a field artillery battalion.

The Paratroopers Brigade "Folgore" did field one command & signals battalion, one Paratroopers Assault Battalion (a Special Forces Unit), three Paratroopers Battalions, one Airborne Field Artillery Group with Mod 56 howitzers, one logistic battalion, one Army Aviation Helicopter Battalion and an Engineer Company.

Three of the five Alpine Brigades consisted of one command & signals battalion, two Alpini battalions, one Alpini Training Battalion, two mountain artillery groups (Mod 56), one logistic battalion, an Anti-Tank Company and an Engineer Company; In contrast, the "Tridentina" brigade fielded an Alpini d'Arresto Battalion instead of the Alpini Training Battalion. The exception was the Julia Alpine Brigade which consisted of one command & signals battalion, four Alpini Battalions, one Alpini d'Arresto Battalion, one Alpini Training Battalion, three Mountain Artillery Battalions, one logistic battalion, an Anti-Tank Company and an Engineer Company, making the Julia the largest brigade of the Italian Army. The "d'Arresto" Alpini and Infantry units were designated to hold specific fortified locations directly at the border to slow down an attacking enemy. They were not a maneuver element but attached for training and logistic purposes to brigades stationed close to the border.

The Missile Brigade "Aquileia" fielded a mix of heavy artillery and missile units, both capable of firing tactical nuclear weapons. The main missile weapon of the brigade was the MGM-52 Lance missile.

==== Unit summary ====
In total the Italian Army fielded at the end of the Cold War:

Quantity	Unit Type	Equipment	Notes
19	Tank Battalions	Leopard 1A2; M60A1	Two battalions per Armored Brigade, one battalion per mechanized brigade, while the "Ariete" brigade fielded three tank battalions. Each tank battalion fielded three tank companies of 16 tanks and one tank for the battalion commander for a total of 49 tanks.
9	Armored Battalions	M47 Patton; M113 APC	Armored battalions combined tanks and mechanized infantry, and one was assigned to each Motorized Brigade. One battalion was assigned to the 4th Alpine Army Corps, one battalion to the 5th Army Corps, one battalion to the Central Military Region, and two were training battalions of the Armored Cavalry School and the 1st Armored Infantry Regiment, respectively. Each battalion fielded 33 M47 Patton tanks and 24 M113 APCs.
2	Reconnaissance Squadrons Groups	Leopard 1A2; M113 APC	Originally each division had one reconnaissance squadrons group. With the abolition of the divisional level, one squadron was reformed as a tank squadron group and joined the "Brescia" brigade. One was reformed as a mechanized squadron group and joined the "Vittorio Veneto" brigade. The two remaining reconnaissance squadron groups joined the "Mameli" and "Pozzuolo del Friuli" brigades. Each group fielded three reconnaissance squadrons of ten tanks and eight M113 APCs, with the battalion commander's tank, a group fielded a total of 31 tanks and 24 M113.
35	Mechanized Infantry	M113 APC	One battalion per Armored Brigade, three battalions per mechanized brigade. The twelve Bersaglieri battalions were, without exception, mechanized infantry units; the remainder of the mechanized infantry were two Granatieri di Sardegna battalions, sixteen infantry battalions, and four cavalry squadron groups. One battalion was a training and demonstration unit of the army's Infantry and Cavalry School. Each battalion fielded 68 M113 APCs and 17 M106 mortar carriers.
12	Motorized Infantry		Two battalions per motorized brigade, three battalions in the "Aosta" brigade, and one battalion in Triest as part of the "Vittorio Veneto" brigade tasked with defending the city in case of a Yugoslavian attack. The army stored the equipment for five additional motorized battalions.
13	Alpini		Two battalions per Alpine Brigade; with the "Julia" brigade fielding a total of four Alpini battalions, an additional battalion under the Military Alpine School in Aosta.
5	Paratroopers		One Carabinieri paratroopers battalion, two paratroopers battalions, and one paratroopers assault (Special Forces) battalion. Additionally, the 4th Army Corps fielded an Alpini Paratroopers Company.
6	Fortification Infantry		One Alpini, five infantry battalions, and one Alpini company designated to hold specific fortified sectors of the Eastern and Northern Italian border. The strength of the battalions varied from 10 to 19 companies.
2	Amphibious Infantry	LVT-7	One Lagunari battalion, one amphibious vehicles battalion and one training company tasked with defending Venice under the Amphibious Troop Command. The Lagunari battalion was organized like a mechanized infantry battalion.
33	Training Battalions		The training battalions were tasked with the basic training of recruits: four Alpini, one paratrooper, one Granatieri, and 27 infantry battalions trained.
11	Self-Propelled Artillery	M109 howitzers	One group (equivalent to a battalion) per armored and mechanized brigade (except for the "Pinerolo", "Legnano", "Trieste", "Granatieri di Sardegna" and "Brescia" mechanized brigades), two groups in one regiment under 3rd Army Corps, one battery as part of the army's artillery school in Rome and one training battery on Sardinia. Each group fielded three batteries of six M109 howitzers.
18	Field Artillery	M114 howitzers	One group per motorized brigade (except the "Sassari" Motorized Brigade), one group per alpine brigade, one group in "Pinerolo", "Legnano", "Trieste", "Granatieri di Sardegna" and "Brescia" mechanized brigades, one group under 5th Army Corps, one under the Tuscan-Emilian Military Region, two in Southern Italy under the Southern Military Region, and one battery as part of the Army's artillery school in Rome. Each group fielded three batteries of six M114 howitzerss.
6	Mountain Artillery	Mod 56 howitzers	One group per Alpine Brigade, with the "Julia" Alpine Brigade fielding two groups. Each group fielded three batteries of six Mod 56 howitzers.
1	Airborne Artillery	Mod 56 howitzers	One airborne field artillery group as part of the Paratroopers Brigade "Folgore" with three batteries of 6 × Mod 56 howitzers each.
8	Heavy Field Artillery	FH-70 howitzers	Heavy Field Artillery groups, served as Corps Artillery: two under 3rd Army Corps, two under 4th Alpine Army Corps, four under 5th Army Corps and one battery as part of the army's artillery school in Rome. Each group fielded three batteries of six FH-70 howitzers.
1	Heavy Artillery	M115 howitzers	One group under 5th Army Corps. Originally capable of firing tactical nuclear ammunition and part of the "Aquileia" artillery brigade, the unit lost its nuclear role in 1986. The group fielded three batteries of four M115 howitzers.
1	Heavy Self-Propelled Artillery	M110A2 howitzers	One group as part of "Aquileia" brigade capable of firing tactical nuclear ammunition. The group fielded three batteries of six M110A2 howitzers.
1	Missile Artillery	MGM-52 Lance	The only missile artillery group of the army was capable of firing tactical nuclear missiles. The group fielded three batteries of two MGM-52 Lance launchers.
8	Target Acquisition		Six Artillery Specialist Groups with artillery radars and drones supporting the army corps, one target acquisition group supporting the Missile Brigade "Aquileia", one reserve group as part of the Horse Artillery Regiment.
7	Light Anti-aircraft Artillery	FIM-92 Stinger; 40/70 Anti-air guns	Five active and two reserve groups under the Anti-aircraft Artillery Command.
4	Anti-aircraft Missile Artillery	MIM-23 Hawk	Grouped in two regiments under the Anti-aircraft Artillery Command. Each group fielded four batteries with six MIM-23 Hawk launchers.
17	Engineer battalions		Engineer battalions were under the Army Corps', and the Military Regional Commands and came in various specializations: Eight pioneer battalions tasked with construction duties, two combat engineer battalions supported the Army Corps', two railway construction and two bridge construction battalions were grouped into two regiments under the Army's Engineer Inspectorate, one pioneer battalion served as training and demonstration unit under the Army's engineering school, while two mining battalions were tasked with building and maintaining fortifications in the Alpine border regions of Italy. Additionally 24 Combat Engineer companies supported each of the army's brigades (with the exception of the "Sassari" brigade).
5	Reconnaissance helicopter	AB 206 A109 EOA	Four squadrons flying AB 206 and one squadron flying A109 EOA helicopters.
5	Transport helicopter	AB 205 AB 412 CH-47 Chinook	One squadron flying CH-47 Chinook Helicopters in Viterbo and six squadrons flying AB 412 and AB 205 helicopters.
9	General aviation	AB 212 SM-1019	The squadrons were dispersed all over the nation and supported various regional commands.
17	Signal battalions	Additionally two independent companies.	
3	Electronic Warfare Battalions		
1	NBC-defense Battalion		Part of Engineer corps, but under direct command of the Army's General Staff.
25	Logistic battalions		One logistic battalion per brigade; with the exception of the "Sassari" brigade.
6	Logistic Maneuver Battalions		The logistic maneuver battalions ensured the mobility and logistic support of the Army's three Corps Commands.
9	Transport Battalions		Transport battalions provided mobility and logistic support to Territorial Commands and the Army and Armed Forces General Staffs in Rome.
26	Command and Signal Units		One command and signals unit per brigade, one for the Army's Anti-aircraft Artillery Command, and a Command and Signals Company for the Amphibious Troop Command.

Additionally the Army fielded 24 Anti-tank companies, one in each combat brigade except the "Sassari" brigade.

=== Post Cold War ===
The end of the cold war in 1989 and the subsequent dissolution of the Soviet Union in 1991 created a new geopolitical environment in Europe, which contributed to implementation of significative reductions in the strength of the armed forces of all the NATO countries, to obtain the so called "peace dividend". This was reflected also in the Italian Army, that in the following decades went through several reductions, named "reforms".

=== 1991 reform ===
In 1991, the Army began the post-Cold War draw-down of its forces with the disbandment of seven brigades and a large number of smaller units. The brigades disbanded in 1991 were the "Aquileia", "Brescia", "Goito", "Mameli", "Orobica", "Trieste", and "Vittorio Veneto". The units subordinated to these brigades were mostly disbanded, while the "Garibaldi" brigade command was transferred with one of its battalions to Campania.

=== 1997 reform ===
With the relaxing military situation, the Italian Army kept drawing down forces and disbanding smaller military units, which necessitated a major reorganization by 1997 to merge the remaining battalions into coherent units and disband now superfluous brigade commands. Thus a further six brigades were disbanded during the latter half of 1996 and 1997: "Acqui", "Cadore", "Cremona", "Gorizia", "Legnano", and "Mantova". In addition, the remaining units were moved to new bases and changed in composition, designation, and tasks. The three Army Corps were renamed, and their functions expanded: the 3rd Army Corps became the "Projection Forces Command" (COMFOP), commanding the rapid reaction forces of the Army, the 4th Alpine Army Corps became the "Alpine Troops Command" (COMALP) focusing on peace-keeping operations and the 5th Army Corps became the "1st Defense Forces Command" (COMFOD1) tasked with defending Northern Italy. On 1 January 1998, the "2nd Defense Forces Command" (COMFOD2) was activated in Naples and tasked with defending South and Central Italy. During the Cold War, the Italian Army units were to be commanded in wartime by NATO's LANDSOUTH Command in Verona; on 1 October 1997, out of elements of the aforementioned NATO Command, the new "Operational Terrestrial Forces Command" (COMFOTER) was activated. The COMFOTER took command of all the combat, combat support, combat service support and CIS units of the Italian Army. Along with the COMFOTER in Verona, a Support Command (COMSUP) was raised in Treviso, which gained operational control of all the remaining combat support, combat service support and CIS units of the Army. The COMSUP controlled three division-sized formations (Army Aviation Command, Anti-aircraft Artillery Command, C4-IEW Command) and three brigade-sized formations (Field Artillery Brigade, Engineer Brigade, Logistic Support Command).

Thus after the 1997 reform the structure of the Italian Army was as follows:

- COMFOTER (Verona):
  - COMFOP (Milan):
    - Paratroopers Brigade "Folgore" (Livorno)
    - Mechanized Brigade "Friuli" (Bologna)
    - Bersaglieri Brigade "Garibaldi" (Caserta)
  - COMALP (Bolzano):
    - Alpine Brigade "Julia" (Udine)
    - Alpine Brigade "Taurinense" (Turin)
    - Alpine Brigade "Tridentina" (Brixen)
  - COMFOD 1 (Vittorio Veneto):
    - Armored Brigade "Ariete" (Pordenone)
    - Mechanized Brigade "Centauro" (Novara)
    - Cavalry Brigade "Pozzuolo del Friuli" (Gorizia)
  - COMFOD 2 (Naples):
    - Mechanized Brigade "Aosta" (Messina)
    - Mechanized Brigade "Granatieri di Sardegna" (Rome)
    - Armored Brigade "Pinerolo" (Bari)
    - Mechanized Brigade "Sassari" (Sassari)
  - COMSUP (Treviso):
    - Army Aviation Command (Viterbo)
    - Anti-aircraft Artillery Command (Padua)
    - C4-IEW Command (Anzio)
    - Field Artillery Brigade (Portogruaro)
    - Engineer Brigade (Udine)
    - Logistic Support Command (Udine)

=== 2002 reform ===
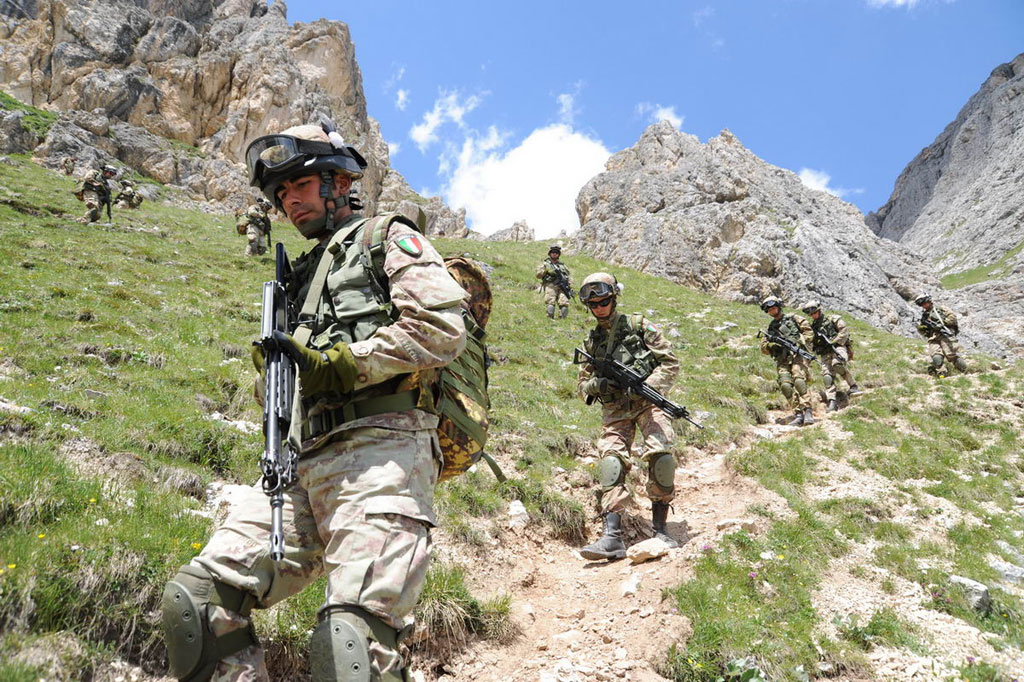
Alpini of the 7th Alpini Regiment during the Falzarego 2011 exercise

Between 1997 and 2002 the Army continued to tweak the new structure and with the abolition of obligatory military service a further two brigades ("Centauro", "Tridentina") were disbanded in 2002. On 1 December 2000, the COMFOP became the NATO Rapid Deployable Corps Italy (NRDC-IT) and passed its subordinate units to the COMFOD 1 ("Friuli", "Folgore") and COMFOD 2 ("Garibaldi") commands. The "Friuli" Brigade changed its composition and became an airmobile brigade with Army Aviation, Cavalry and Infantry units. The COMSUP had already been reorganized and streamlined in 2000.

After 2002 the structure of the Italian Army was as follows:

- COMFOTER (Verona):
  - NRDC-IT (Milan):
    - NRDC-IT Signal Brigade (Milan)
  - COMALP (Bolzano):
    - Alpine Brigade "Julia" (Udine)
    - Alpine Brigade "Taurinense" (Turin)
  - COMFOD 1 (Vittorio Veneto):
    - Armored Brigade "Ariete" (Pordenone)
    - Paratroopers Brigade "Folgore" (Livorno)
    - Airmobile Brigade "Friuli" (Bologna)
    - Cavalry Brigade "Pozzuolo del Friuli" (Gorizia)
  - COMFOD 2 (Naples):
    - Mechanized Brigade "Aosta" (Messina)
    - Bersaglieri Brigade "Garibaldi" (Caserta)
    - Mechanized Brigade "Granatieri di Sardegna" (Rome)
    - Armored Brigade "Pinerolo" (Bari)
    - Mechanized Brigade "Sassari" (Sassari)
  - C4-IEW Command (Anzio)
  - COMSUP (Treviso):
    - Anti-aircraft Artillery Brigade (Padua)
    - Air Cavalry Command (Viterbo)
    - Field Artillery Brigade (Portogruaro)
    - Engineer Brigade (Udine)
    - Logistic Projection Brigade (Udine)

=== 2011 reform ===
During 2011 some small changes regarding the support units of the Army were enacted. The COMSUP took command of the Army's schools and merged them, where possible, with the support brigades. Minor units were moved South and to the islands to reduce the Army's footprint in the wealthier North of Italy. At the same time, the designation of the "Pinerolo" brigade was changed back to Mechanized Brigade. Afterwards the COMSUP consisted, besides four Army schools of the following commands:

- Anti-aircraft Artillery Command (Sabaudia)
- Artillery Command (Bracciano)
- Engineer Command (Rome)
- Logistic Projection Command (Rome)

=== 2013 reform ===
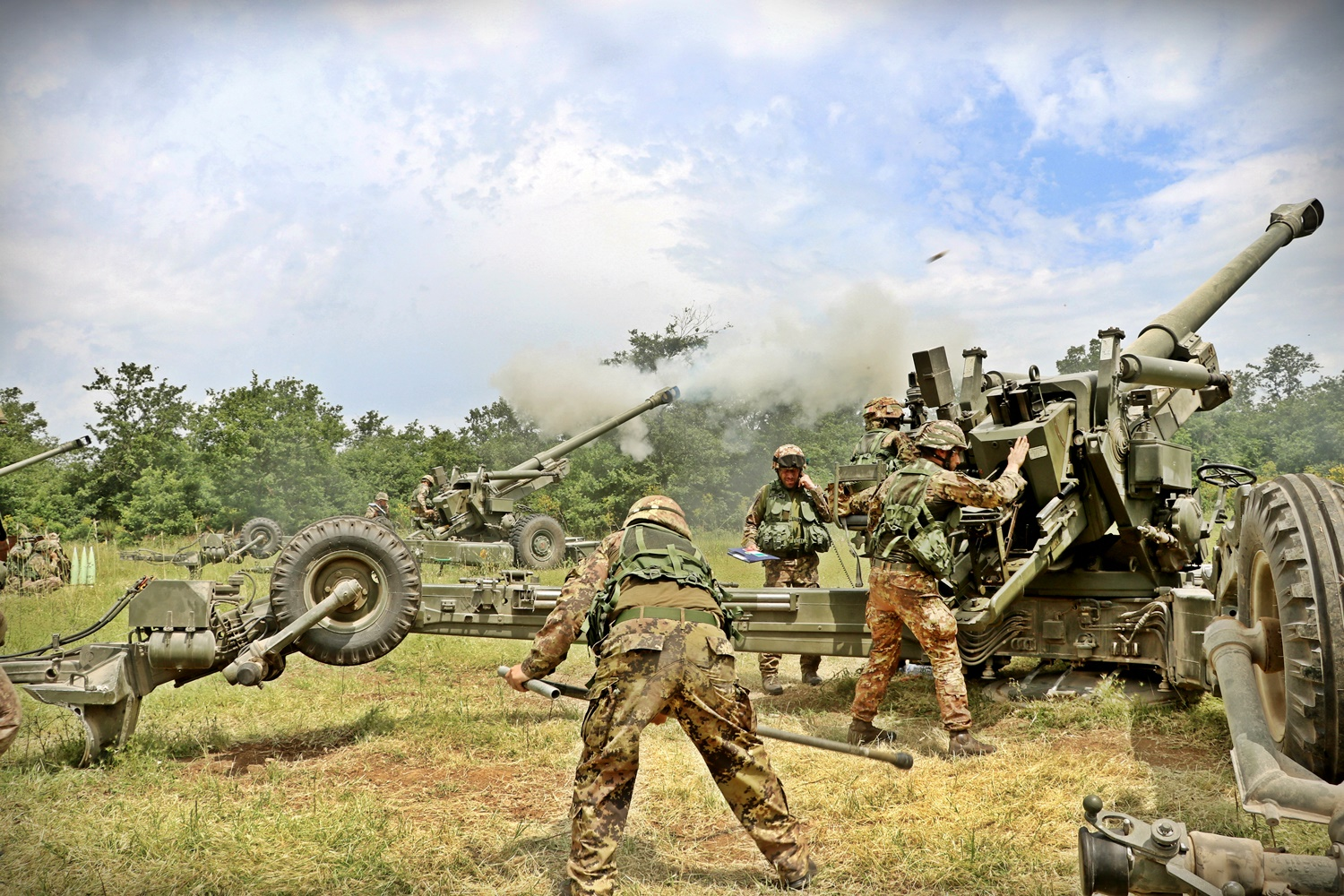
The 1st Field Artillery Regiment (Mountain) on exercise

In 2013 the Army began a major reform. The three corp-level commands COMFOD 1, COMFOD 2 and COMALP were to disband, while the "Mantova" Division Command moved from Vittorio Veneto to Florence, where it was renamed as Division "Friuli", taking the name and traditions of the Air Assault Brigade "Friuli". Together with the other two divisions Acqui and Tridentina the Friuli took command of operational brigades of the Italian Army.

The Logistic Projection Command was disbanded, and its units attached directly to the brigades. As part of the reform, the Army raised the Army Special Forces Command (COMFOSE) in Pisa, which took command of all Special Operations Forces of the Army. Furthermore, the Operational Terrestrial Forces Command (COMFOTER) in Verona was split on 1 October 2016 into the "Operational Land Forces Command and Army Operational Command" in Rome and the "Operational Land Forces Support Command" in Verona.

At the end of the reform the plan envisioned that the Army would consist of:

- 2 × heavy brigades (Ariete, Garibaldi) armed with, Centauro tank destroyers, Ariete tanks, Dardo infantry fighting vehicles and PzH2000 self propelled artillery
- 2 × medium brigades (Aosta, Pinerolo) armed with Centauro tank destroyers and Freccia infantry fighting vehicles and FH-70 towed artillery
- 4 × light brigades (Folgore, Julia, Taurinense, Sassari) armed with Centauro tank destroyers, Puma armoured personnel carriers and FH-70 towed artillery
- 1 × air-assault brigade (Pozzuolo del Friuli) with Pumas, A129 Mangusta attack and NH90 transport helicopters.

After the reform, each maneuver brigade, except the "Pozzuolo del Friuli" and "Sassari", was planned to field the following units: a command and signal unit with the brigade staff, one cavalry reconnaissance regiment, three combat maneuver regiments, one artillery regiment, one engineer regiment, and one logistic regiment.

The "Pozzuolo del Friuli" brigade was planned to merge with the "Friuli" brigade and field a cavalry reconnaissance regiment, an air-assault infantry regiment, an amphibious-assault infantry regiment, a reconnaissance helicopter regiment, an attack helicopter regiment, a field artillery regiment, an engineer regiment, a logistic regiment as well as the standard command and signal unit with the brigade staff.

The "Sassari" brigade would not field a cavalry reconnaissance regiment and an artillery regiment unless funds were to be found to raise these units on Sardinia. The "Granatieri di Sardegna" brigade was destined to disband, with its cavalry regiment joining the "Pinerolo" brigade. In contrast, the 1st Granatieri di Sardegna Regiment was planned to become a public duties unit under the Capital Military Command in Rome. In 2013 the reform started with the disbanding of the 131st Tank Regiment and the 57th Infantry Battalion "Abruzzi", while the 33rd Field Artillery Regiment "Acqui" was reformed as 185th Paratroopers Artillery Regiment "Folgore". In 2014 the 2nd Mountain Artillery Regiment was disbanded, followed by the 5th Anti-aircraft Artillery Regiment "Pescara" and the 47th Infantry Regiment "Ferrara" in 2015.

As part of the reform, all army schools, training regiments and training centres were to be combined into the newly raised Army Formation, Specialisation and Doctrine Command (Comando per la Formazione, Specializzazione e Dottrina dell'Esercito or COMFORDOT) in Rome. However, as of July 2019, the Alpine Training Center and the Parachuting Training Center remain with the Alpine Troops Command and the Paratroopers Brigade Folgore, respectively.

=== 2019 changes ===
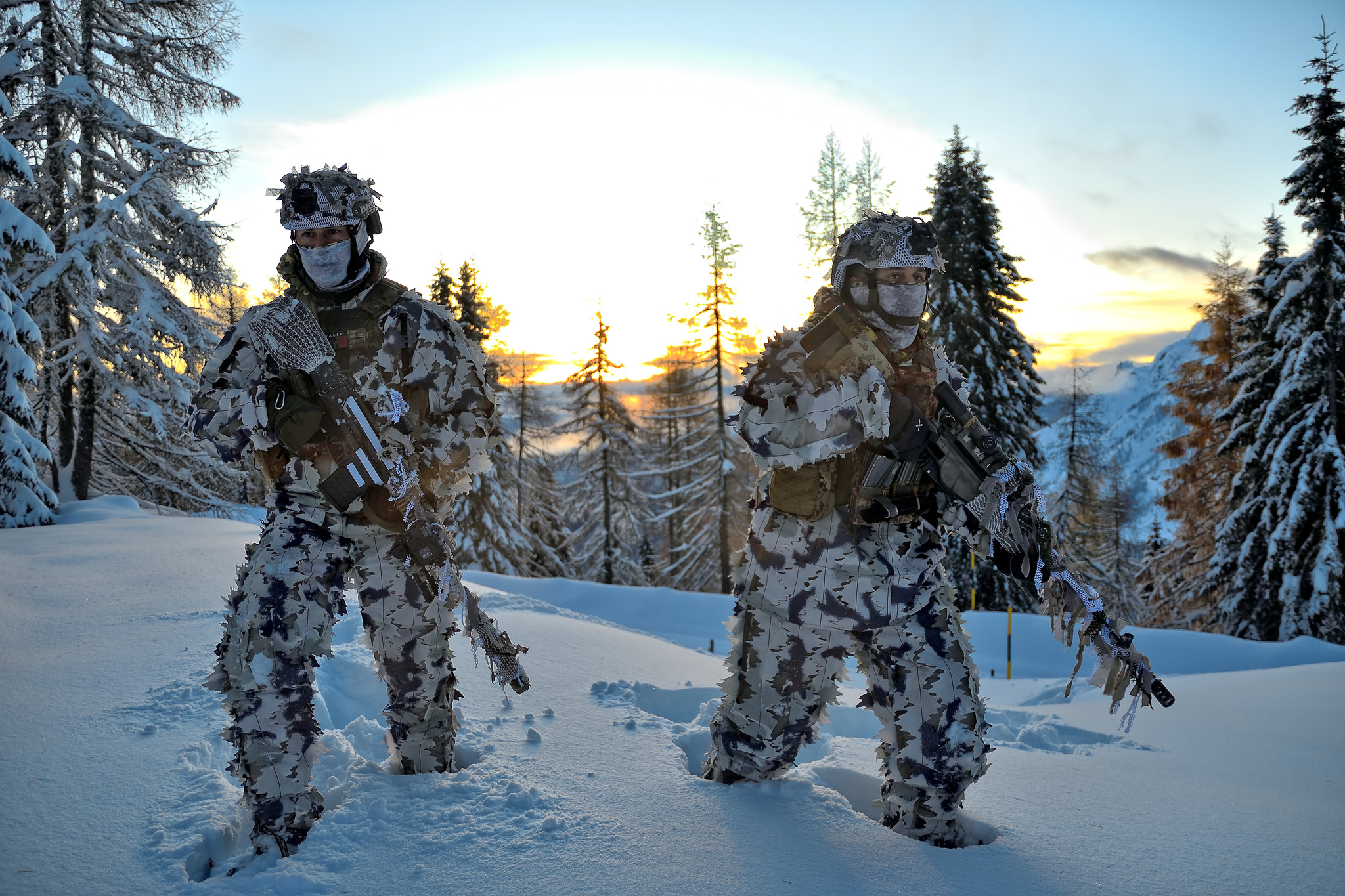
Italian 8th Alpini Regiment snipers in winter ghillie suits in 2019

As the security situation in Europe had changed in 2014 with the Russian annexation of Crimea the 2013 reform was paused. Neither were the "Pozzuolo del Friuli", and "Friuli" brigades merged, nor was the "Granatieri di Sardegna" brigade disbanded. On 1 July 2019, the army officially ended the 2013 reform: on that date in Florence, the Division "Friuli" was renamed Division "Vittorio Veneto". With this, the traditions of the name "Friuli" returned to the Airmobile Brigade "Friuli", whose merger with the "Pozzuolo del Friuli" brigade was disbanded. Likewise the disbanding of the "Granatieri di Sardegna" brigade was disbanded, and it was decided that the second battalion of the brigade's 1st "Granatieri di Sardegna" "Regiment" would become independent as 2nd Grenadier Battalion "Cengio" and grow to regiment by 2020 as first step to bring the brigade back to full strength.

On 10 January 2020 the 31st Tank Regiment was reformed as Regiment "Cavalleggeri di Lodi" (15th) thus completing the transformation of the Mechanized Brigade "Pinerolo".

=== 2023 changes ===
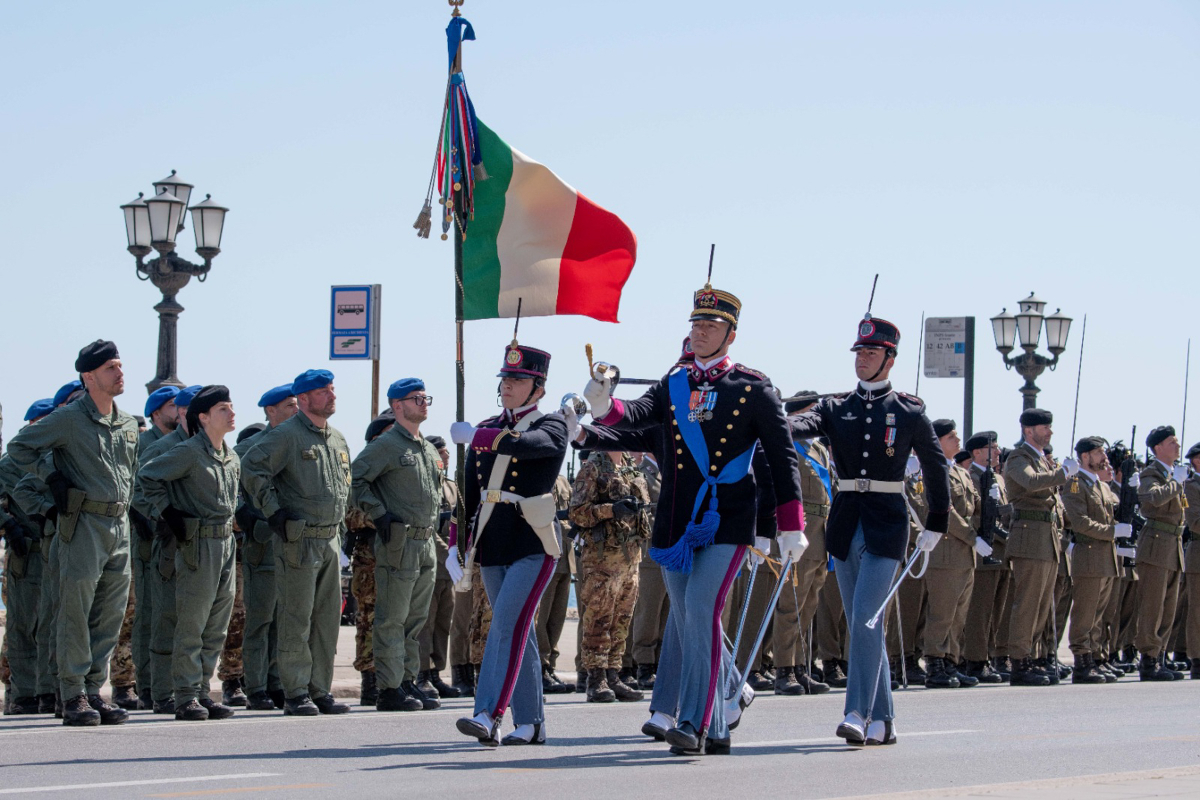
The Italian Army's flag on parade during the army's birthday celebration in Bari on 2 May 2025

In May 2023 the two deployable division commands "Acqui" and "Vittorio Veneto", as well as the Army Simulation and Validation Center were assigned to the Operational Land Forces Command and Army Operational Command. On 1 July 2023 the Capital Military Command was merged into the Operational Land Forces Command and Army Operational Command, which on the same date changed its name to Operational Land Forces Command.

== Operations ==
The Italian Army has participated in operations to aid populations hit by natural disasters. It has, moreover, supplied a remarkable contribution to the forces of police for the control of the territory of the province of Bolzano/Bozen (1967), in Sardinia ("Forza Paris" 1992), in Sicily ("Vespri Siciliani" 1992) and in Calabria (1994). Currently, it protects sensitive objectives and places throughout the national territory ("Operazione Domino") since the September 11 attacks in the United States.

The army is also engaged in Missions abroad under the aegis of the UN, the NATO, and of Multinational forces, such as Beirut in Lebanon (1982), Namibia (1989), Albania (1991), Kurdistan (1991), Somalia (1992), Mozambique (1993), Bosnia (1995), East Timor and Kosovo (both in 1999), the Democratic Republic of the Congo (2001), Darfur (2003), Afghanistan (2002), Iraq (2003) and Lebanon again (2006). (From 1980, Italy was the third major world contributor, after USA and the UK, in peacekeeping missions.) The later Gallo Commission investigated a number of serious and substantiated allegations of repeated abuses of Somali non-combatants during the UNOSOM deployment.

The Carabinieri, once the senior corps of the Army, is now an autonomous armed force (alongside the Army, Navy and Air Force). The Carabinieri provide military police services to all the Italian armed forces.

== Command structure ==
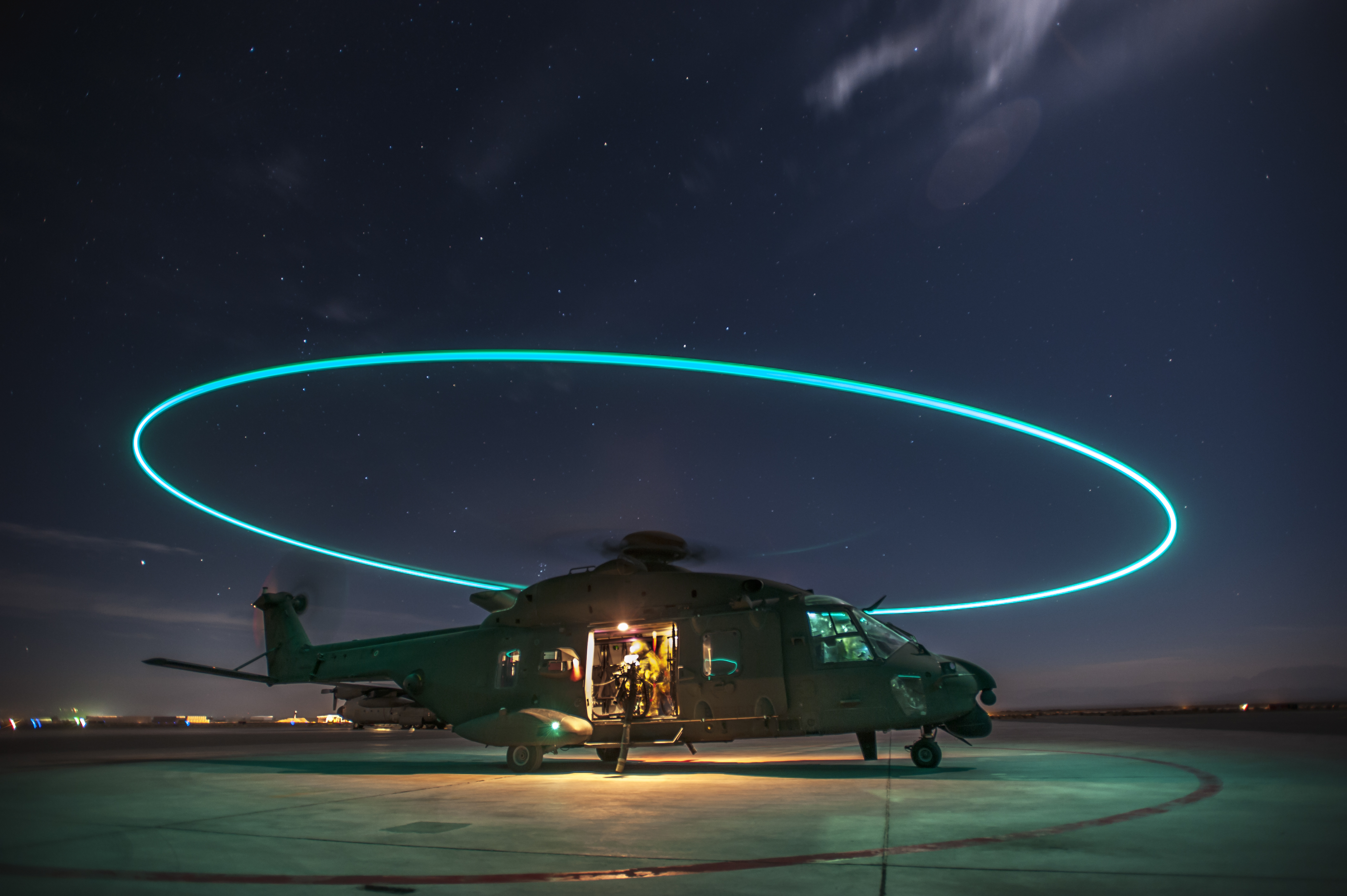
7th Army Aviation Regiment "Vega" NH90 helicopter during a night-time mission

The Armed Forces of Italy are under the command of the Italian Supreme Defense Council, presided over by the President of the Italian Republic.

== Ranks ==
Ranks are part of the uniform.

=== Commissioned officer ranks ===
The rank insignia of commissioned officers.

NATO code	OF-10	OF-9	OF-8	OF-7	OF-6	OF-5	OF-4	OF-3	OF-2		OF-1
Italian Army
Italian Army		Generale	Generale di Corpo d'Armata/ Tenente Generale	Generale di Divisione/ Maggior Generale	Generale di Brigata/ Brigadier Generale	Colonnello	Tenente Colonnello	Maggiore	Primo capitano	Capitano	Tenente	Sottotenente

=== Other ranks ===
The rank insignia of non-commissioned officers and enlisted personnel.

NATO code	OR-9			OR-8	OR-7		OR-6	OR-5	OR-4	OR-3	OR-2	OR-1
Italian Army				Maresciallo capo / Maresciallo ordinario / Maresciallo					Gradutato aiutante / Primo graduato / Graduato capo / Graduato scelto / Graduato
Italian Army	Primo luogotenente	Luogotenente	Primo maresciallo	Maresciallo capo / Maresciallo ordinario / Maresciallo	Sergente maggiore aiutante	Sergente maggiore capo	Sergente maggiore	Sergente	Gradutato aiutante / Primo graduato / Graduato capo / Graduato scelto / Graduato	Caporal maggiore	Caporale	Soldato

== Organisation ==
Italian Army main formations 2024

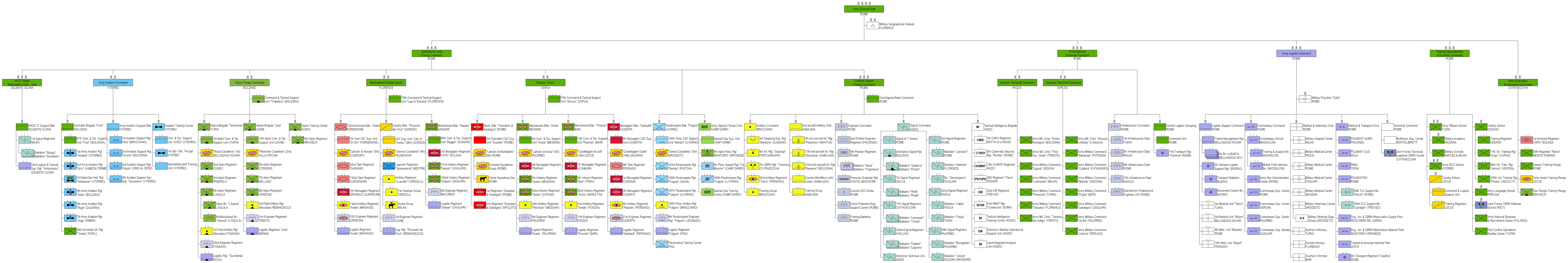
Italian Army organization as of 1 October 2025

Higher commands	Corps & Division-level	Brigade-level
Operational Land Forces Command
Operational Land Forces Command	NRDC – Italy	NRDC-ITA Support Brigade
Operational Land Forces Command	Army Aviation Command	Airmobile Brigade "Friuli"; Army Aviation Support Brigade
Operational Land Forces Command	Alpine Troops Command	Alpine Brigade "Julia"; Alpine Brigade "Taurinense"
Operational Land Forces Command	Multinational Division South	132nd Armored Brigade "Ariete"; Cavalry Brigade "Pozzuolo del Friuli"; Mechanized Brigade "Sassari"
Operational Land Forces Command	Division "Acqui"	Mechanized Brigade "Granatieri di Sardegna"; Mechanized Brigade "Aosta"; Mechanized Brigade "Pinerolo"; Bersaglieri Brigade "Garibaldi"
Operational Land Forces Command	Combat Support Forces Command	Artillery Command; Anti-aircraft Artillery Command; Engineer Command; Signal Command; Tactical Intelligence Brigade
Operational Land Forces Command		Army Special Forces Command; Paratroopers Brigade "Folgore"
Army National Territorial Command	Northern Territorial Command; Southern Territorial Command	
Army National Territorial Command		Infrastructure Command
Army Logistic Command		Logistic Support Command; Materiel and Transport Command; Commissary Command; Medical and Veterinary Command
Army Training, Specialization & Doctrine Command	Army Officers School; Army Non-Commissioned Officers School	
Army Training, Specialization & Doctrine Command		Infantry School; Cavalry School

== Unit organizations ==
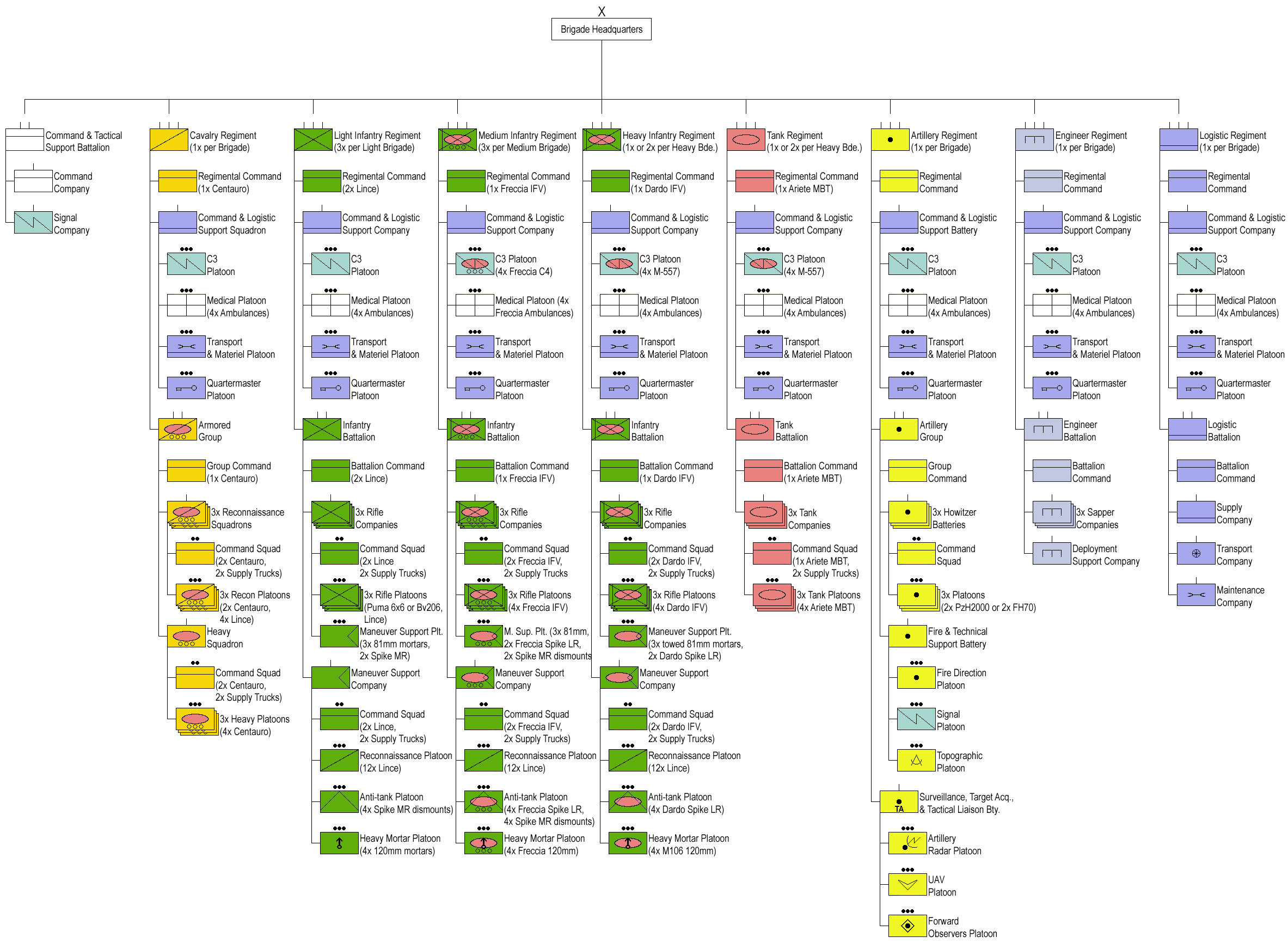
Brigade, regiment, and battalion organizations

All brigades have been deployed and are continuously deployed in operations outside of Italy. Combat brigades field between 3–5,000 troops each. Brigade maneuver units are designated as regiments but field men and equipment similar to large battalions, consisting of large command and logistic support company and a combat battalion. Artillery regiments field an additional Surveillance, Target Acquisition and Tactical Liaison Battery.

Every complete Italian Army brigade fields the following units:

- Brigade headquarters
  - Command and Tactical Support Battalion
    - Command company
    - Signal company
  - Cavalry regiment
    - Command and logistic support squadron
    - Armored Squadrons Group
      - 3 × reconnaissance squadrons (each with 6 × Centauro and 12 × VTLM Lince (Centauros to be replaced with 6 × Freccia PLUS Reconnaissance))
      - Heavy armored squadron (14 × Centauro, (being replaced with Centauro II))
  - Artillery regiment
    - Command and logistic support battery
    - Surveillance, target acquisition and tactical liaison battery (with artillery radars, drones, forward observers)
    - Artillery group
      - 3 × howitzer batteries (each with 6 × PzH2000 or FH70 howitzers)
      - Fire and technical support battery (Fire Direction Center)
  - Engineer regiment
    - Command and logistic support company
    - Engineer battalion
      - 3 × sapper companies (Combat engineers)
      - Deployment support company (construction, bridging, etc.)
  - Logistic regiment
    - Command and logistic support company
    - Logistic battalion
      - Supply company
      - Maintenance company
      - Transport company

Depending on the type of brigade (light, medium, heavy) each brigade fields three maneuver battalions. Currently, the Folgore, Taurinense, and Julia each field three light infantry regiments, the Pinerolo and Aosta each field three medium infantry regiments, and the Garibaldi and Ariete field two, respectively one heavy infantry regiment, and one, respectively two tank regiments. The Friuli, Sassari, Granatieri di Sardegna and Pozzuolo del Friuli brigades' regiments are structured like all other army regiments. However, these four brigades do not field the full complement of eight units.

Currently the army's maneuver regiments are organized as follows:

- Light infantry regiment (Alpini, Lagunari, Paratroopers; and 66th Airmobile Infantry Regiment "Trieste")
  - Command and logistic support company
  - Infantry battalion
    - 3 × rifle companies (with VTLM Lince, Bv206 (Alpini units only); each company with 3 × 81 mm mortars and 2 × Spike MR launchers)
    - Maneuver Support Company (4 × 120 mm mortars, 4 × Spike MR launchers)
- Medium infantry regiment (5th, 9th, 62nd, 82nd infantry regiments; 3rd, 6th, 7th Bersaglieri regiments)
  - Command and logistic support company
  - Infantry battalion
    - 3 × rifle companies (each with 14 × Freccia Combat, 3 × 81 mm mortars, 2 × Freccia Combat Anti-tank with Spike LR and 2 × Spike MR launchers)
    - Maneuver Support Company (2 × Freccia Combat, 4 × Freccia Mortar Carrier with 120 mm mortar, 4 × Freccia Combat Anti-tank with Spike LR and 4 × Spike MR launchers, 12x VTLM Lince reconnaissance role)
- Heavy infantry regiment (1st, 8th, and 11th Bersaglieri regiments; planned to be equipped with IFVs: 1st and 2nd Grenadier regiments)
  - Command and logistic support company
  - Infantry battalion
    - 3 × rifle companies (each with 14 × Dardo IFV, 3 × 81 mm mortars, 2 × Dardo Spike LR)
    - Maneuver Support Company (2 × Dardo IFV, 4 × M106 120 mm mortar carriers, 4 × Dardo Spike LR)
- Tank regiment (4th, 32nd, and 132nd tank regiments)
  - Command and logistic support company
  - Tank Battalion
    - 3 × tank companies (each with 13 × Ariete main battle tanks)

Two of the three infantry regiments of the Sassari brigade are still equipped as light regiments, while the brigade's 3rd Bersaglieri Regiment has begun the switch to medium infantry regiment on 6 January 2018. The 2nd Regiment "Granatieri di Sardegna" was reactivated on 1 September 2022 as a light infantry regiment and will switch to heavy regiment once new tracked infantry fighting vehicles will be acquired by the army.

== Equipment ==
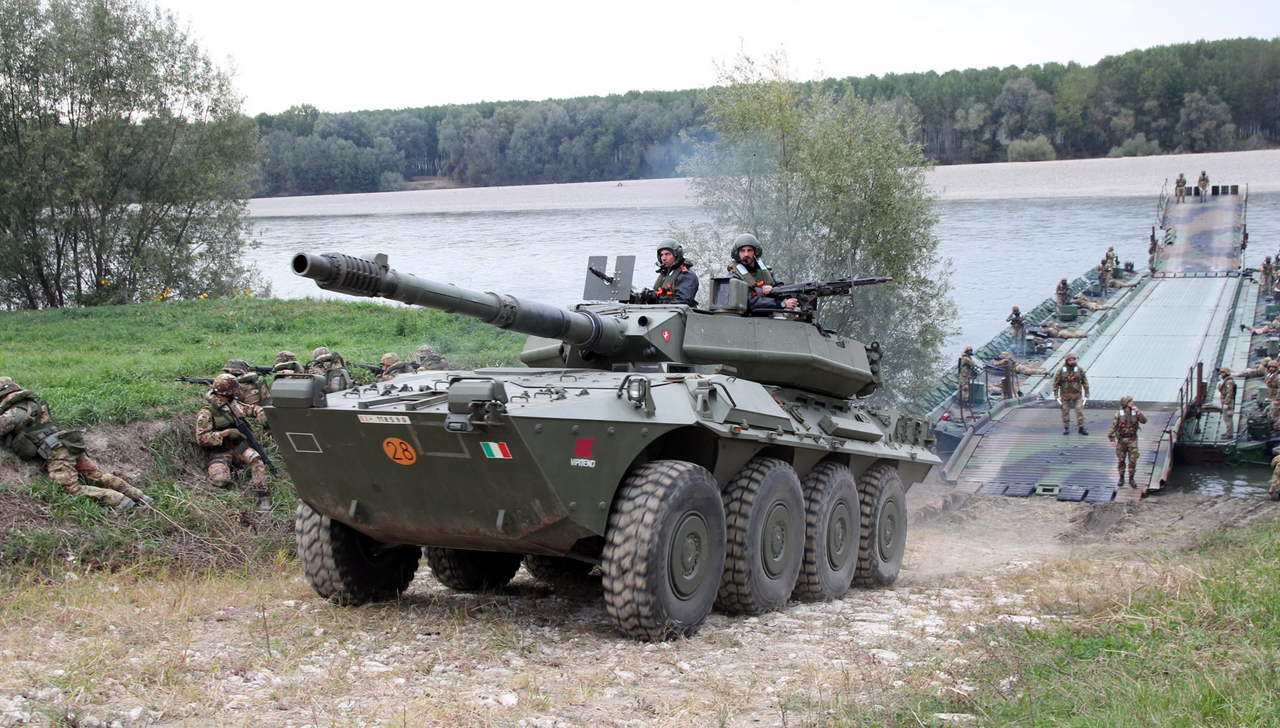
Regiment "Savoia Cavalleria" (3rd) Centauro tank destroyer

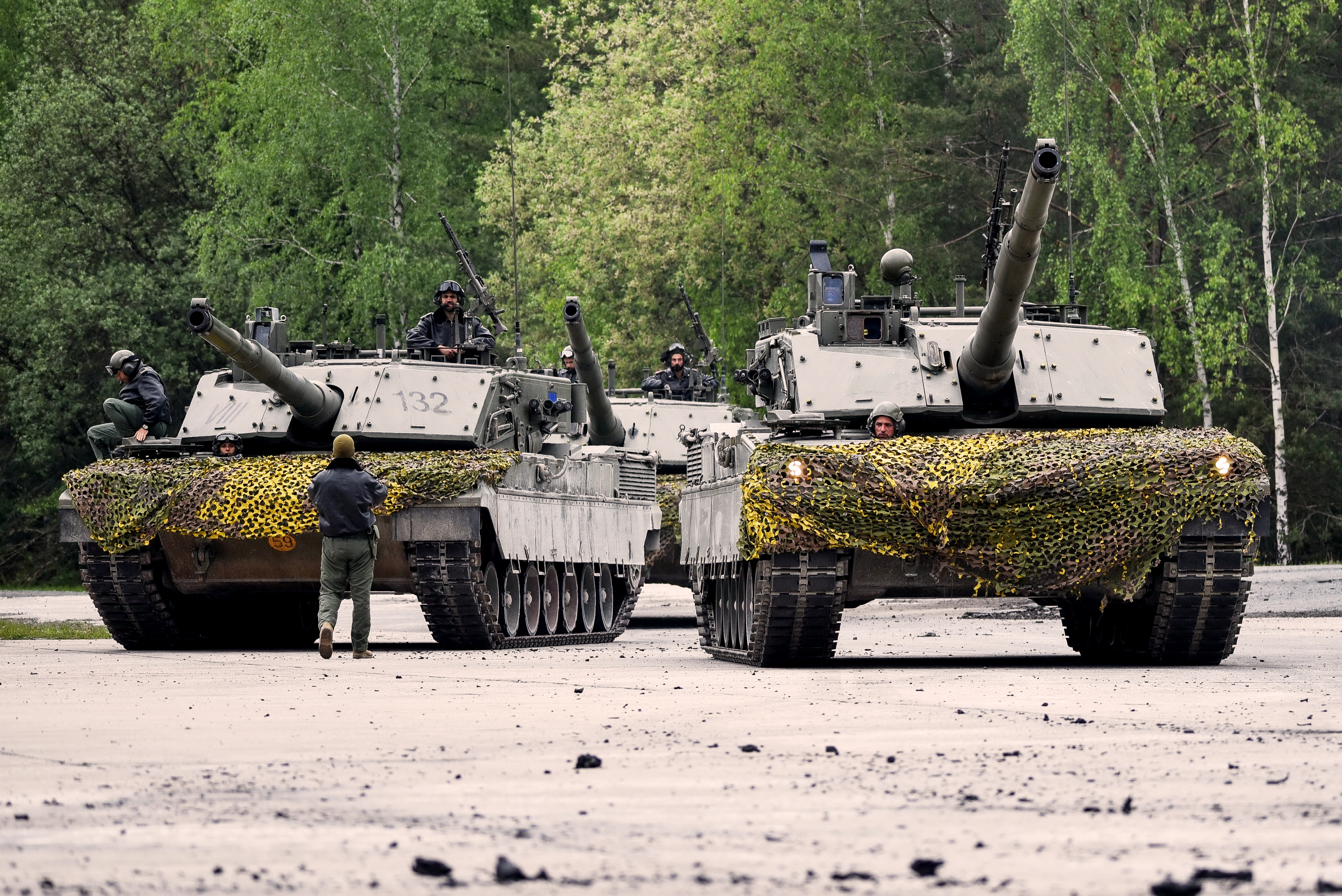
132nd Tank Regiment Ariete main battle tanks

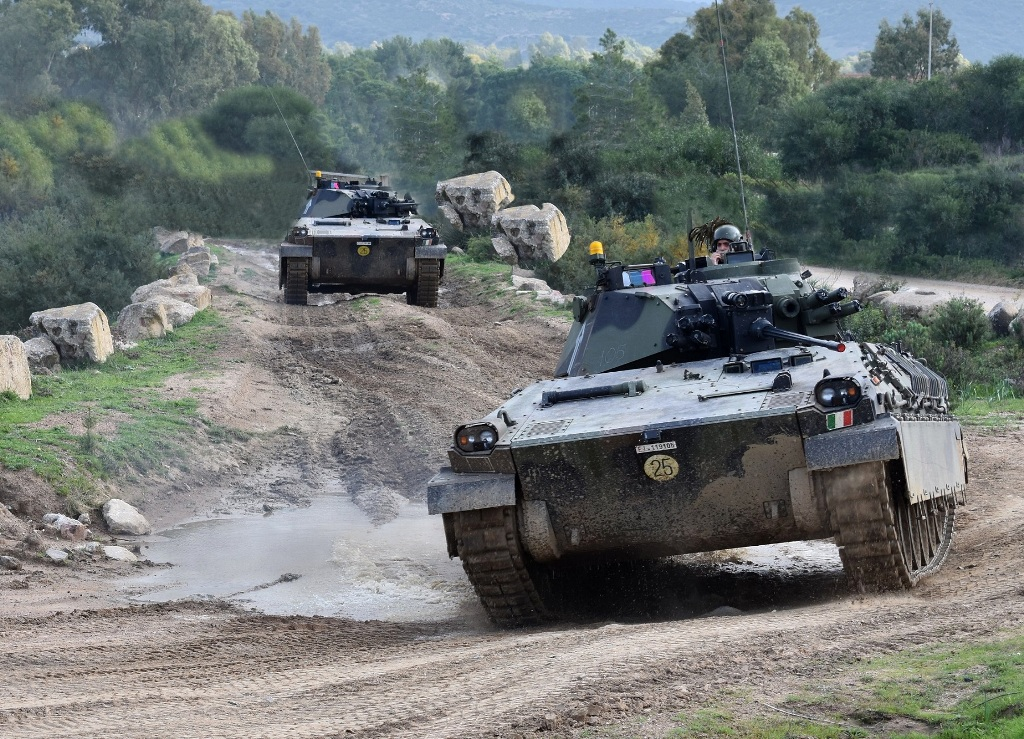
1st Bersaglieri Regiment Dardo IFVs

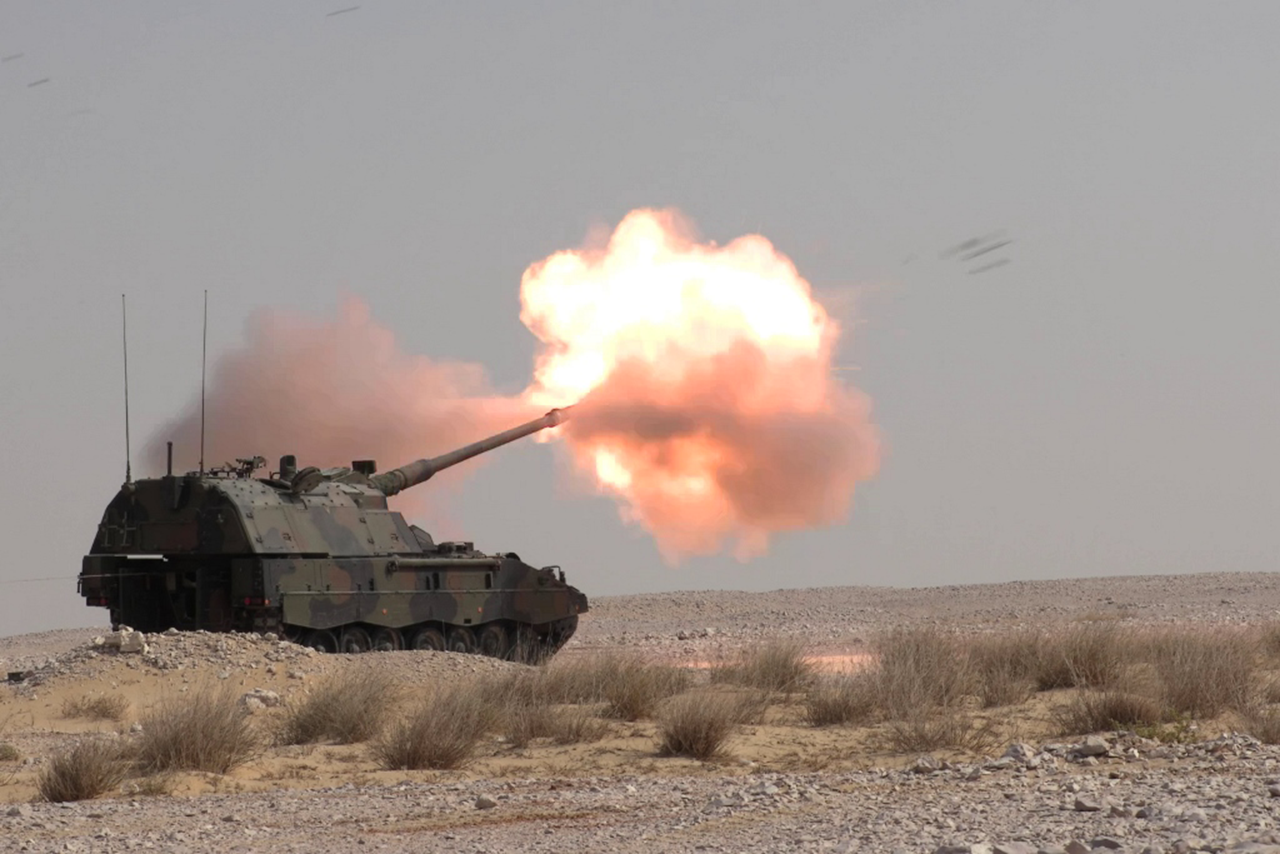
8th Field Artillery Regiment "Pasubio" PzH 2000

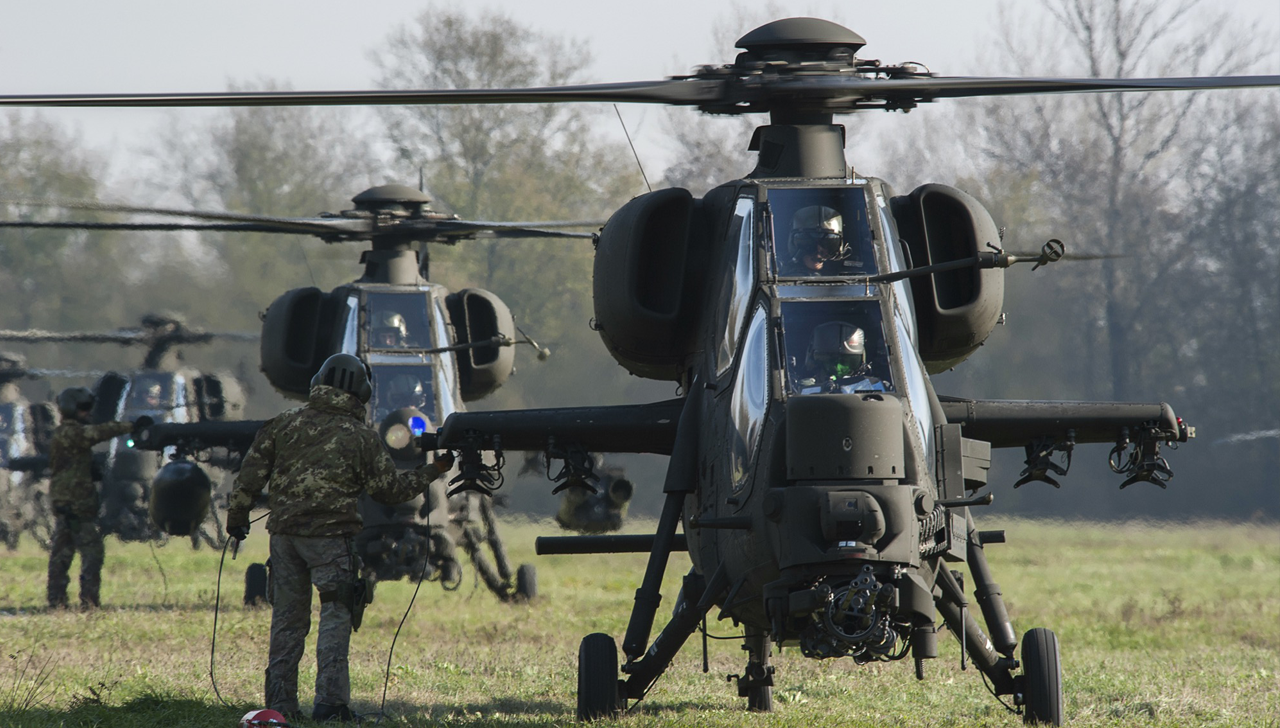
5th Army Aviation Regiment "Rigel" A129 Mangusta attack helicopters

== Uniforms ==
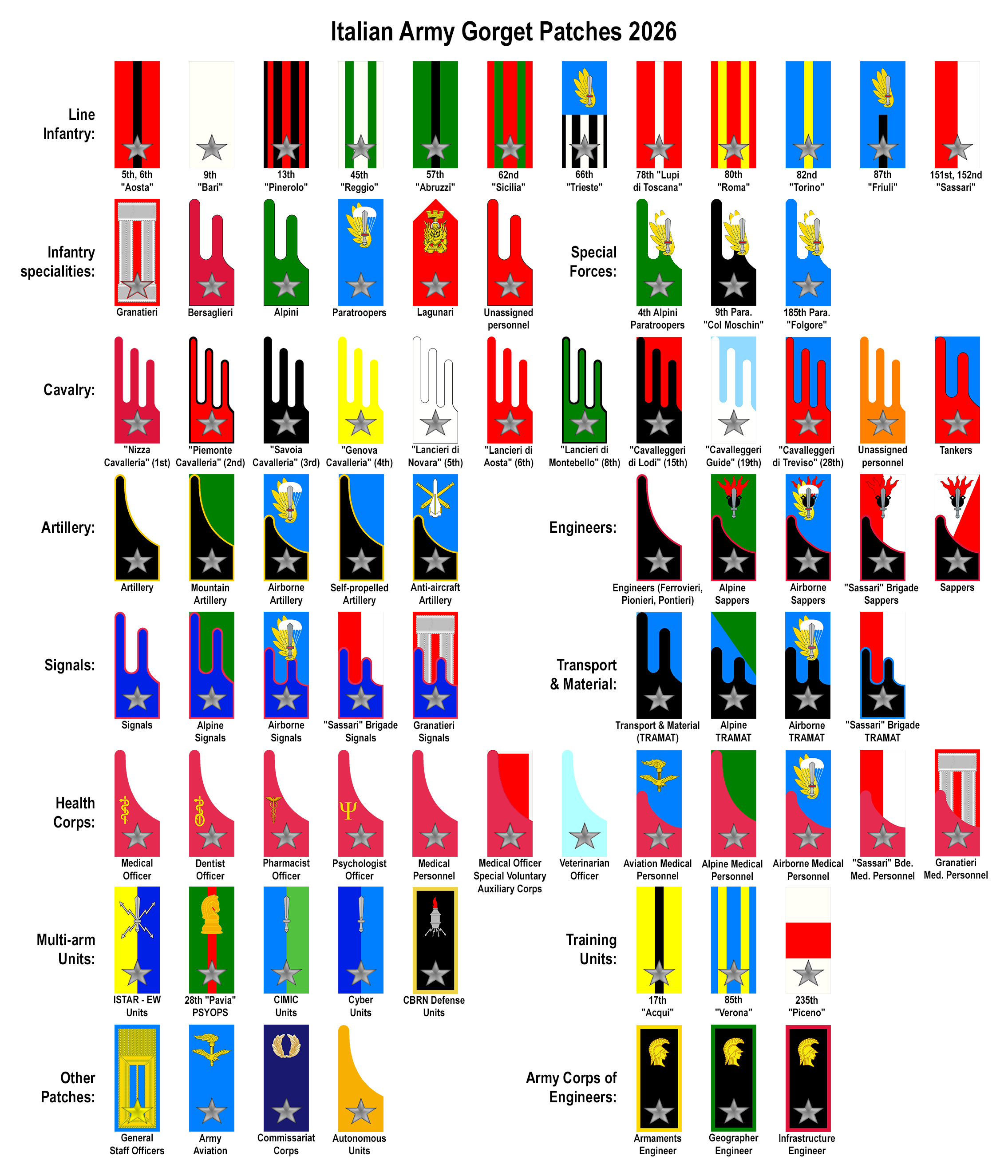
Italian Army gorget patches in use in 2026

The Italian Army uses uniforms that can be divided into four different "families", and hold strict rules that apply to the type of textile, color and badge of the uniforms.. These include: the Regular Uniform (the only one that includes seasonal variations), the Service Uniform, the Service Combat Uniform, and the Ceremonial Uniform (only for officials).

=== The Regular Uniform ===
The Regular Uniform comes in summer and winter versions differing exclusively in textiles used. A single-breasted jacket with four buttons and four pockets, and trousers with a classic cut and front pleats with five pockets. The undershirt also has two small pockets. The uniform is completed by a necktie, brown leather gloves, brown shoes, khaki socks, and a cap or headdress.

=== The Service Uniform ===
The summer and winter Service Uniform have identical cuts and colors to the Regular uniform, while active military personnel always utilize a special headdress included with the uniform.

=== The Service Combat Uniform ===
The Service Combat Uniform is most commonly used out of the four "families" and is distributed to all soldiers with the same mimetic pattern (paratroopers have a different model with strengthening on the shoulders). The uniform comprises a beret, a five-button closure jacket with two internal pockets, and trousers with four pockets. Accessories completing the uniform include gloves, special footwear and a t-shirt with short or long sleeves, depending on the season.

=== The Ceremonial Uniform ===
The Ceremonial Uniform includes a double-breasted jacket with six buttons and two pockets on the hips. Trousers come with a classic cut, having the same jacket fabric. The winter version can be worn with the blue cape infantry, a black rigid cap, white gloves and black shoes. Other accessories such as the necktie, a light blue scarf and a sabre complete the uniform.

== Operations ==
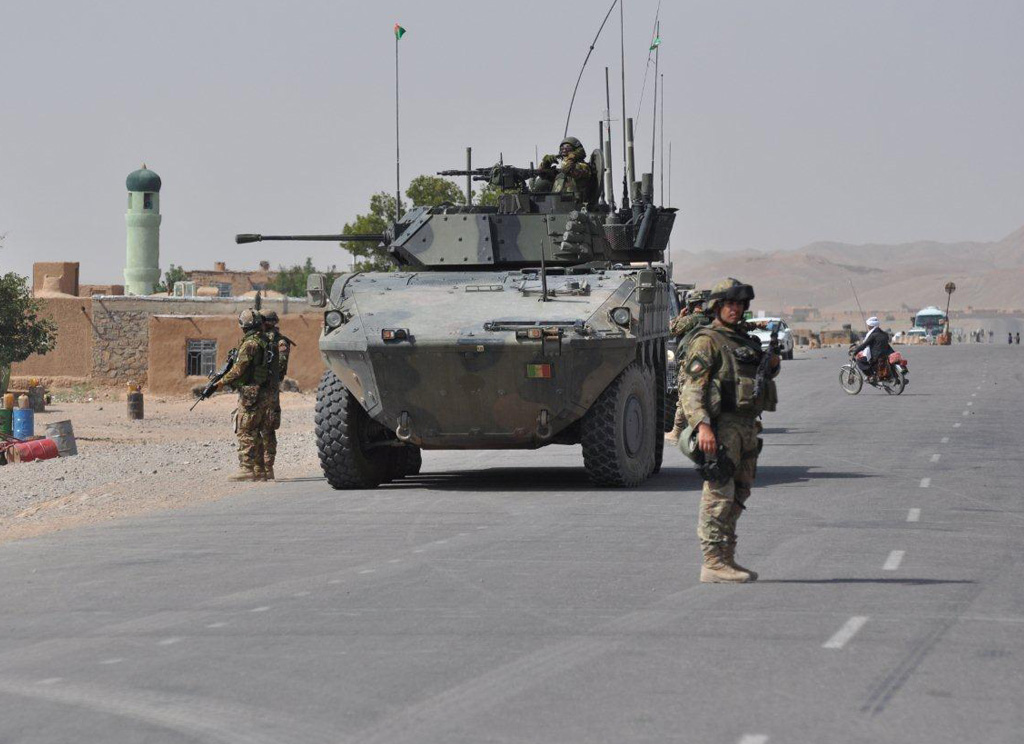
Sassari Mechanized Brigade soldiers on patrol with a VBM Freccia in Afghanistan

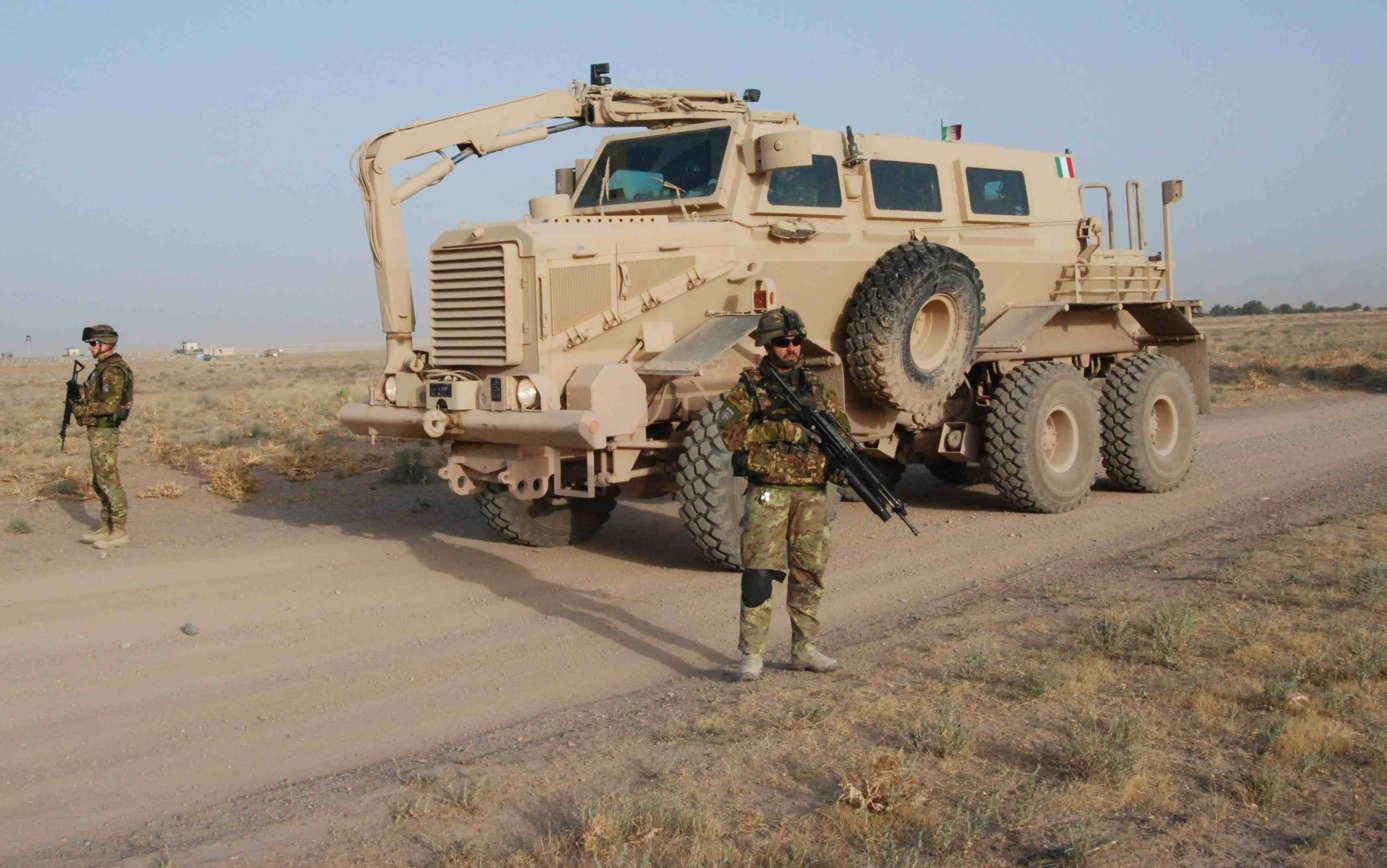
3rd Alpini Regiment soldiers near Shindand in Afghanistan

A post-World War II peace treaty signed by Italy prevented the country from deploying military forces in overseas operations as well as possessing fixed-wing vessel-based aircraft for twenty-five years following the end of the war.

This treaty expired in 1970, but it would not be until 1982 that Italy first deployed troops on foreign soil, with a peacekeeping contingent dispatched to Beirut following a United Nations request for troops. Since the 1980s, Italian troops have participated with other Western countries in peacekeeping operations across the world, especially in Africa, Balkan Peninsula, and the Middle East.

The Italian Army has not engaged in major combat operations since World War II. However, Italian Special Forces have taken part in anti-Taliban operations in Afghanistan as part of Task Force 'Nibbio'. Italy was not yet a member of the United Nations in 1950 at the time of the war with North Korea.

Italy did take part in the 1990–91 Gulf War but solely through the deployment of eight Italian Air Force Panavia Tornado IDS bomber jets to Saudi Arabia; Italian Army troops were subsequently deployed to assist Kurdish refugees in northern Iraq following the conflict.

As part of Operation Enduring Freedom in response to the September 11 attacks, Italy contributed to the international operation in Afghanistan. Italian forces have contributed to ISAF, the NATO force in Afghanistan, and a Provincial reconstruction team, and 53 Italian soldiers have died under ISAF. Italy has sent 4200 troops, based on one infantry company from the 2nd Alpini Regiment tasked to protect the ISAF HQ, one engineer company, one NBC platoon, one logistic unit, as well as liaison and staff elements integrated into the operation chain of command.

Italian forces also command a multinational engineer task force and have deployed a platoon of Italian military police. Italy leads the Regional Command West in Afghanistan, and its HQ is located in Herat at Camp Arena base. Italian Air Force deployed about 30 aircraft, both helicopters and planes: four AMX Ghibli and two RQ-1A Predator that are used in close air support and intelligence missions, Alenia C-27J Spartan, Boeing CH-47C Chinook, NH90 and Lockheed C-130 Hercules, which are used in transport missions; Bell UH-1N Twin Huey and Agusta A129CBT Mangusta are used in missions of fire support to the troops.

The Italian Army did not take part in combat operations of the 2003 Second Gulf War, dispatching troops only after 1 May 2003 – when major combat operations were declared over by the U.S. President George W. Bush. Subsequently, Italian troops arrived in the late summer of 2003 and began patrolling Nasiriyah and the surrounding area. On 26 May 2006, Italian foreign minister Massimo d'Alema announced that the Italian forces would be reduced to 1,600 by June. As of June 2006, 32 Italian troops have been killed in Iraq – with the greatest single loss of life coming on 12 November 2003 – a suicide car bombing of the Italian Carabinieri Corps HQ left a dozen Carabinieri, five Army soldiers, two Italian and eight Iraqi civilians dead.

As of 2006, Italy ranks third in the world in the number of deployed military forces operating in peacekeeping and peace-enforcing scenarios in Afghanistan, Kosovo, Bosnia and Herzegovina, and Lebanon, behind the United States and the United Kingdom.

A recent law promoted recruitment in the Italian Army, giving volunteers a chance to find post-service careers in the Carabinieri, Italian State Police, Italian Finance Police, Fire Department and other state bodies.

== See also ==
- List of units of the Italian Army
- Regio Esercito (World War II)
- Uniforms of the Italian Armed Forces
- List of military weapons of Italy
