= 76 mm Schneider-Danglis Mountain Gun Model 1909 =

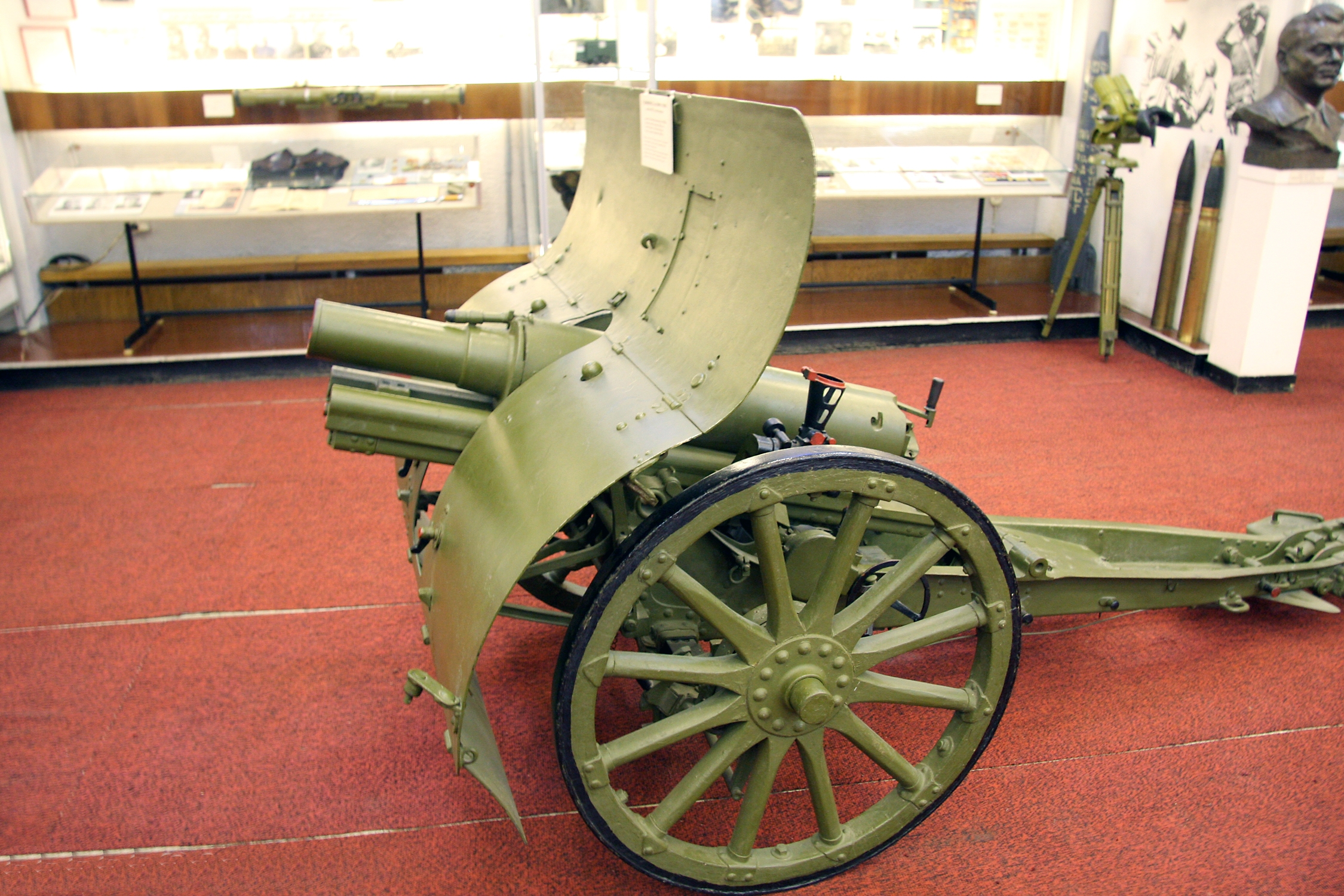
- Russian Model 1909 mountain gun
- Type: Mountain gun
- Place of origin: France

Service history
- Used by: See users
- Wars: World War I Russian Civil War; Finnish Civil War; Soviet-Polish War; Winter War; World War II

Production history
- Designer: Panagiotis Danglis
- Manufacturer: Schneider-Creusot; Putilov Plant
- Produced: 1909–1938
- No. built: 2,060
- Variants: See variants

Specifications
- Mass: Transport: 1,225 kg (2,701 lbs); Combat: 627 kg (1,382 lbs)
- Barrel length: 1.25 m (4 ft 1 in) L/16.5
- Width: 1 m (3 ft 3 in)
- Height: 1.3 m (4 ft 3 in)
- Crew: 6
- Shell: Fixed quick-fire 76.2 × 191 mm R
- Shell weight: 6.23 kg (13 lb 12 oz)
- Caliber: 76.2 mm (3 in)
- Breech: Interrupted screw
- Recoil: Hydro-pneumatic
- Carriage: Box trail
- Elevation: -6° to +28°
- Traverse: 5°
- Rate of fire: 10 rpm
- Muzzle velocity: 387 m/s (1,270 ft/s)
- Maximum firing range: 8,550 m (9,350 yds)

The 76 mm Schneider-Danglis Mountain Gun Model 1909 (Russian 76-мм горная пушка Шнейдера-Данглиса, модель 1909) was a rapid-fire mountain gun based on the Schneider-Danglis mountain gun that was used by the Imperial Russian Army during World War I and the Red Army during World War II.

== History ==
In 1893, the Greek engineer Colonel Panagiotis Danglis developed a design for a 75 mm mountain cannon and submitted it to the Greek Ministry of War. However, he would have to wait ten years before his project was authorized. In 1905, Danglis proposed to the French firm Schneider that a prototype of his gun should be entered in the next competition for the Greek Army. Schneider developed its own carriage for the gun and the revised design was known as the Schneider-Danglis mountain gun. The prototype was tested in France in May 1906 and in April the gun was tested in Greece, after which the gun was adopted for service by the Greek Army. Early in 1909, the Schneider company had produced enough guns to arm six batteries.

== Design ==
The 76 mm Mountain Gun Model 1909 was a breech-loaded howitzer made of steel with an interrupted screw breech and used fixed quick-fire ammunition. It had a box trail carriage, gun shield, two wooden-spoked steel-rimmed wheels, and a hydro-pneumatic recoil mechanism. For transport, the gun could be dismantled into seven mule loads or hooked to a limber and caisson for towing by a horse team when assembled.

== Imperial Russian Army ==
At the beginning of 1908, a Schneider-Danglis gun was demonstrated to the inspector general of artillery of the Imperial Russian Army, Grand Duke Sergei Mikhailovich. At his request, Nicholas II instructed the army to perform competitive tests of rapid-fire mountain guns from Schneider and the Škoda Works. Two guns from Schneider and Škoda were tested by the army in December 1908. An advantage of the Škoda system was its lower weight that made it easier to transport. While the Schneider-Danglis cannon had better ballistics and a reliable hydro-pneumatic recoil mechanism instead of the Škoda spring recoil system.

As a result of the tests, the Artillery Committee obtained a production license from Schneider. On February 25, 1909, the Artillery Committee requested the adoption of the gun to Emperor Nicholas II which he authorized on February 26. Based on the test results, it was decided to replace the original wheels and the sight of the Schneider company with Okhremenko wheels and Hertz panoramic sights produced by the Obukhov Plant. The new gun would also use 76.2 × 191 mm R fixed quick-fire ammunition. Tests revealed that only the ammunition packs met the stipulated 100 kg (220 lb) weight and the rest of the packs weighed from 120–140 kg (260–310 lb) which was too heavy for Russian packhorses. The joints of the carriage also wobbled and rattled while being towed.

== Production ==
It is believed 2,060 M1909s were produced between 1909-1938. On January 1, 1912, all 214 guns of the first order from the Putilov Plant were delivered. Between 1911-1916, the Putilov Plant received orders for another 772 guns. By June 20, 1917, the Putilov Plant had delivered 636 guns from these orders. Another 349 guns were built between 1914-1917, at the St. Petersburg Gun Factory.

Production of the M1909 resumed during the 1920s at plant No. 8 (St. Petersburg Gun Factory, evacuated in 1918 to the village of Podlipki). Between 1924 and 1931, 110 guns were produced there. After that, production was transferred to plant No. 92 (Novoye Sormovo). No guns were produced at plant No. 92 during 1932, 1934, and 1936.

1933	1935	1937	1938	1939	Total
21	20	40	305	250	636

== Variants ==
- The 76 mm counter-assault gun Model 1910 - was a revised version of the M1909. The barrel, breech, and recoil mechanism of the M1909 was installed on a new one-piece box trail carriage which was designed to be light to improve its maneuverability. The M1910 was a fortress gun or flanking gun that was designed to fire shrapnel rounds at short distances and low angles into massed formations of enemy infantry attacking Russian fortifications. The M1910 fired the same projectiles as the M1909, but with a reduced propellant charge to reduce recoil. Serial production of the M1910 began at the Putilov Plant in 1911 and continued until mid-1915. In total, 407 guns were produced during this period in two batches. The M1910 was also used to arm Garford-Putilov Armored Cars.
- The 76 mm infantry gun Model 1913 - was a revised version of the M1909/M1910 that was designed to be an infantry support gun. An early criticism of the M1910 was that its carriage was too flimsy to be towed over rough ground so once again barrel, breech, and recoil mechanism of the M1909 was installed on a new rugged one-piece box trail carriage that was able to withstand rough use. The M1913 was tested and put into production at the Putilov plant in 1914 and also entered service in 1914. 173 M1913 guns were produced by the Putilov Plant.
- The 7.62 cm Infanteriegeschütz L/16.5 - was a German infantry support gun that mated the barrel, breech, and recoil mechanism of captured M1910s on a rugged one-piece box trail carriage built by Krupp. Large numbers of M1910's had been captured early in the war in Poland and Krupp was ordered to adapt them for German use.
- The 76 LK/10/13 - was a Finnish-built gun that mounted the barrel, breech, and recoil mechanism from captured M1910s on a Finnish-built box trail carriage that was an exact copy of the Russian M1913 carriage. The 76 LK/10/13 was also used as an infantry support gun.

== See also ==
- 76 mm regimental gun M1927 - The design of the M1913 was used as the pattern for the M1927. The M1927 could be towed by a horse team and was later modified for motor traction by adding a sprung axle and pneumatic tires.
- 75 mm Schneider-Danglis 06/09 first model 75mm mountain gun used by multiple countries prior to, during and after World War I.

== Users ==
- Russian Empire
- German Empire - A number of captured M1910 barrels were mated to newly built carriages by Krupp and used by the German Army.
- Soviet Union - On November 1, 1936, the Red Army had 622 M1909 guns in service, of which 572 were serviceable, 34 were training guns and 1 was unusable. 80 guns took part in the Winter War and 8 were lost. On June 22, 1941, the Red Army had 1,121 M1906 guns, of which 366 were in reserve.
- Kingdom of Romania - Romania may have operated an unknown number of captured M1909s that had been converted to fire 75 mm ammunition. The Romanians had also bought 24 Schneider-Danglis 75 mm guns in 1912 that they designated Tunul de munte Schneider, calibrul 75 mm, md. 1912.
- Poland - Poland may have operated an unknown number under the designation 76.2 mm Armata górska wz. 1909.
- Finland - Finland captured 49 M1910 and 76 M1913 guns during the Finnish Civil War and gave them the designations 76 LK/10 and 76 LK/13. Finland later bought another 45 guns. Finland converted 40 captured M1910 guns by putting them on Finnish-built M1913 carriages and gave them the designation 76 LK/10/13.
- Nazi Germany - In 1941, the Germans captured an unknown number of M1909s, which they designated 7.62 cm GebK 293(r).

== Gallery ==
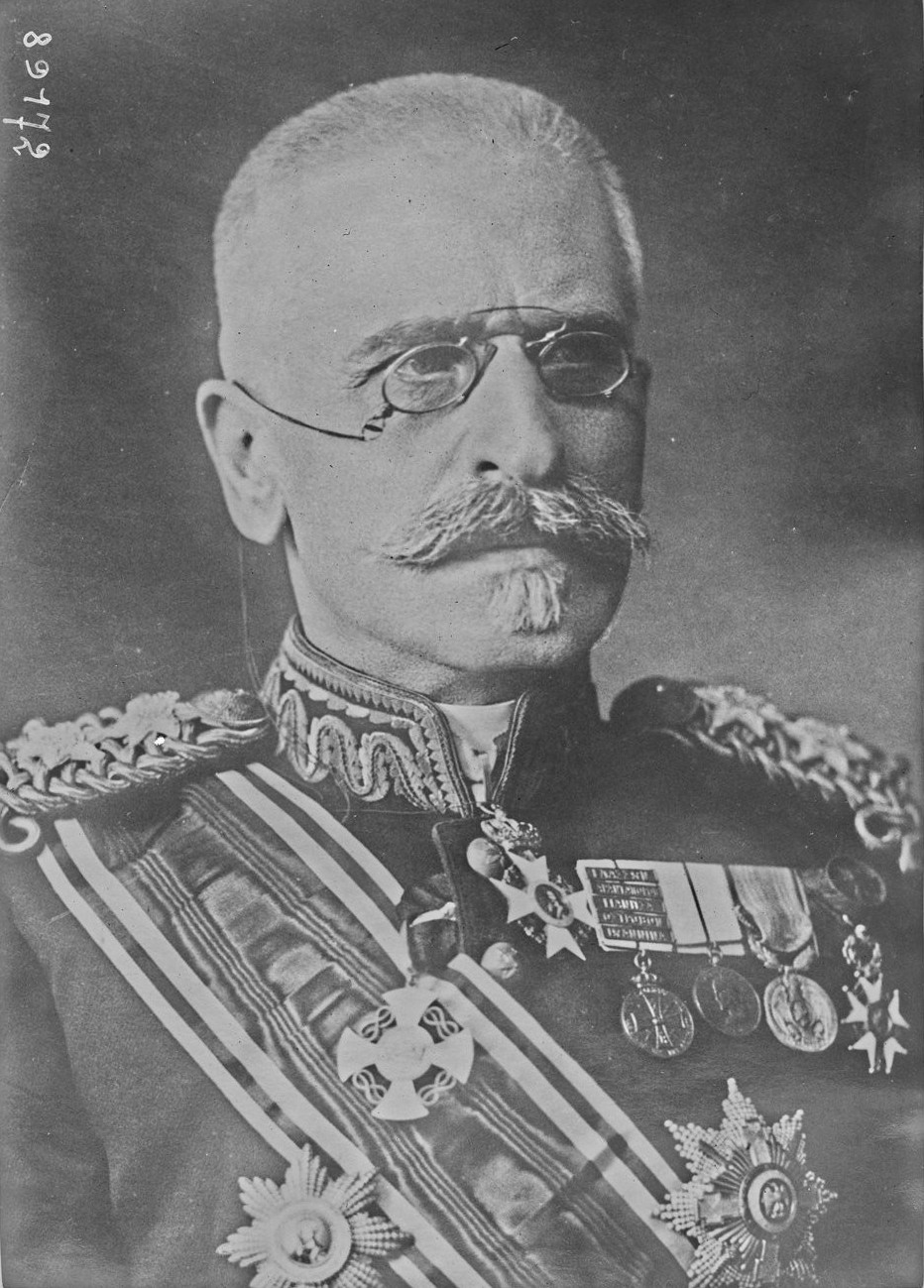
Greek general and politician Panagiotis Danglis.

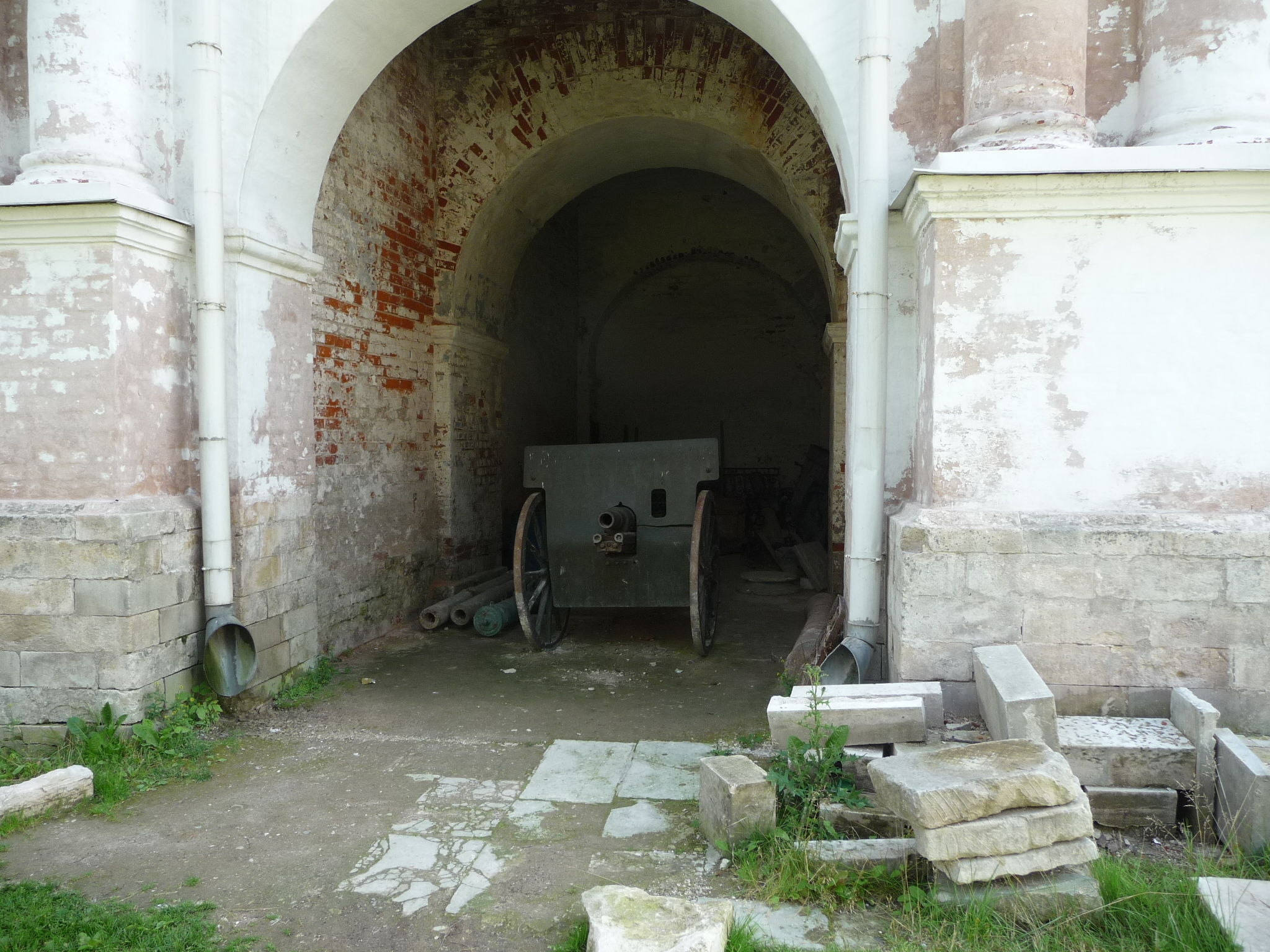
A 76 mm counter-assault gun M1910 at the Novodevichy Convent in Moscow Russia.

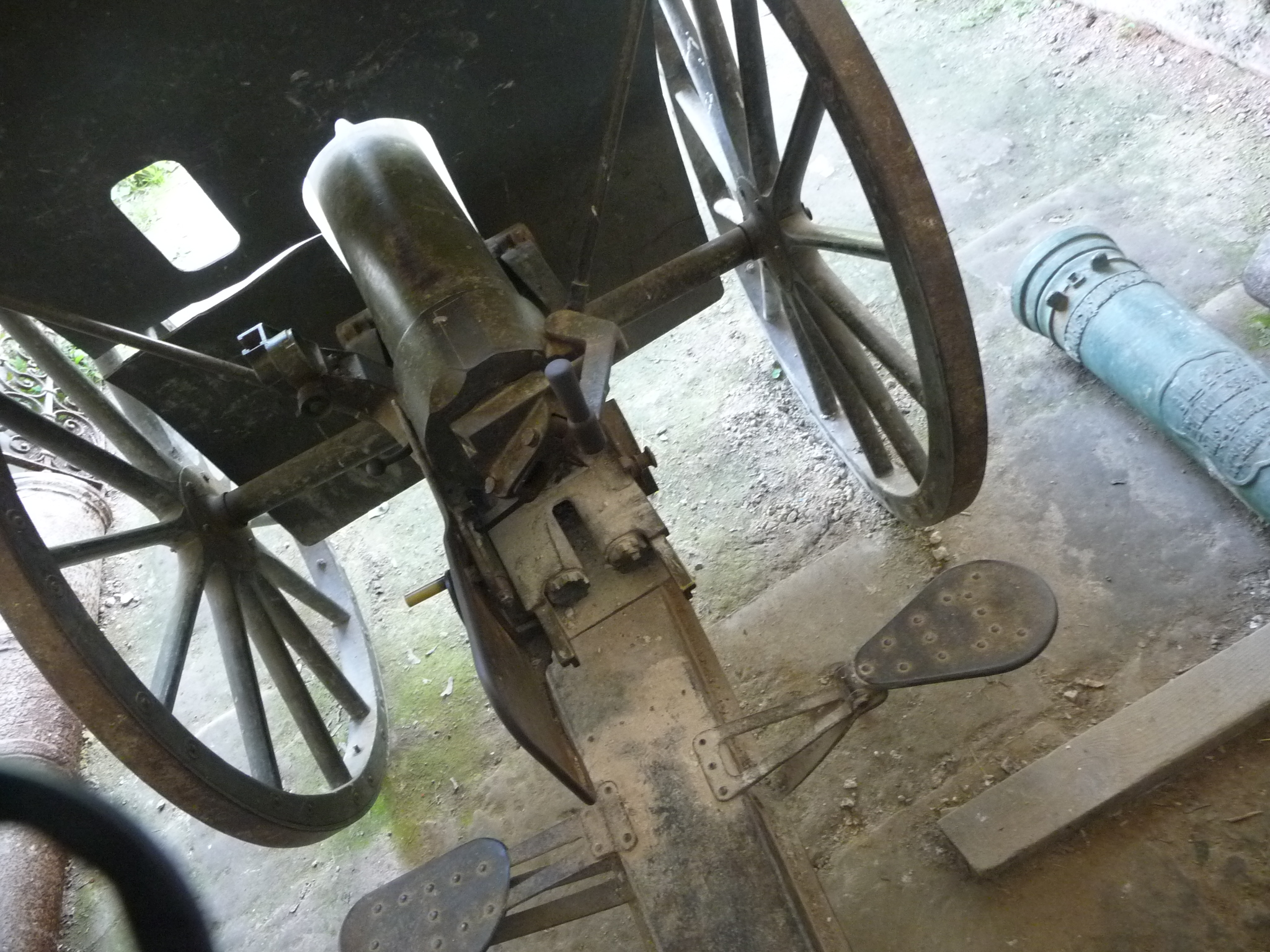
A M1910. Note the lightly built carriage.

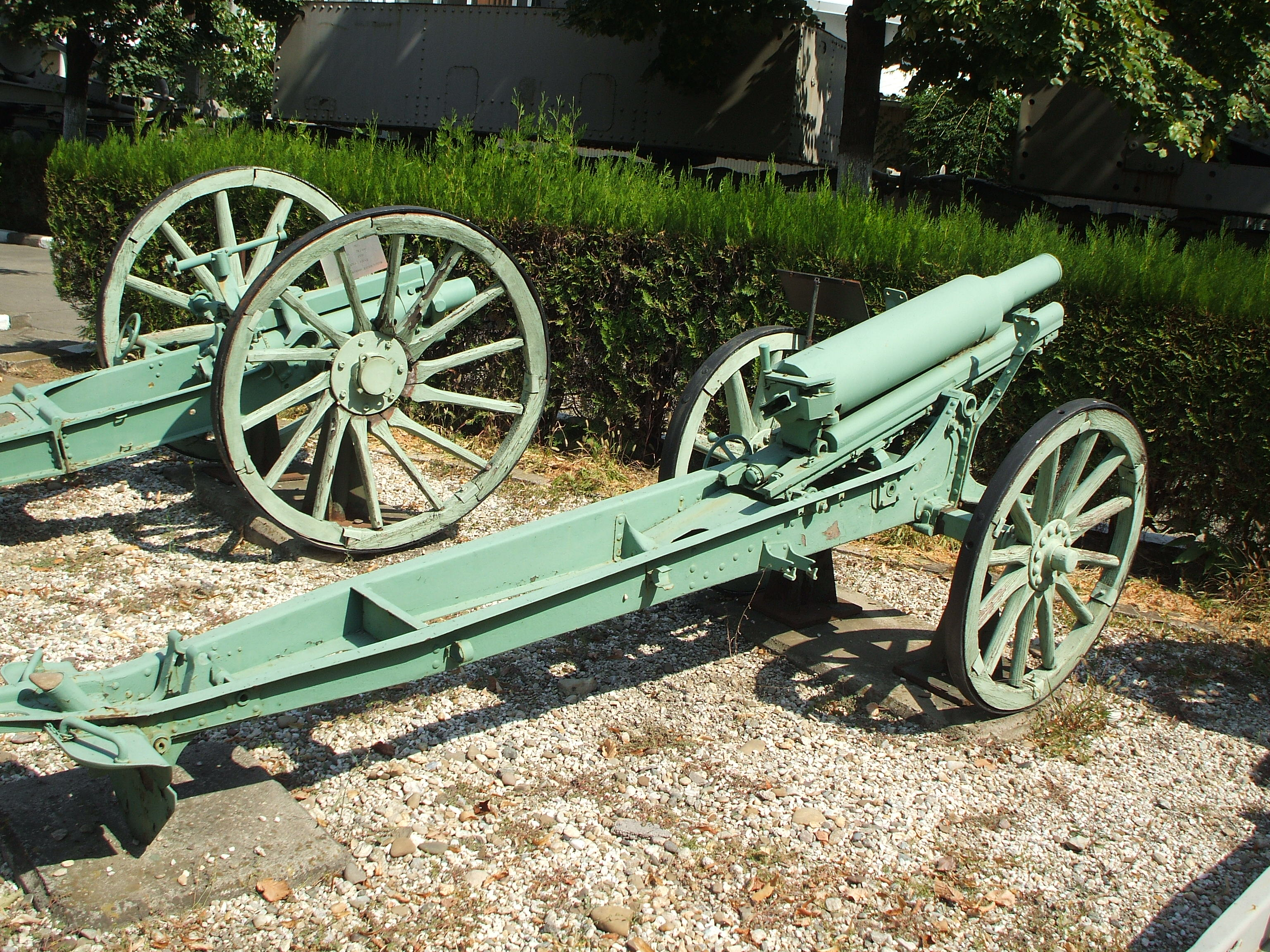
A M1904 Mountain Gun (left) and M1909 Mountain Gun (right) at the National Military Museum in Bucharest Romania.

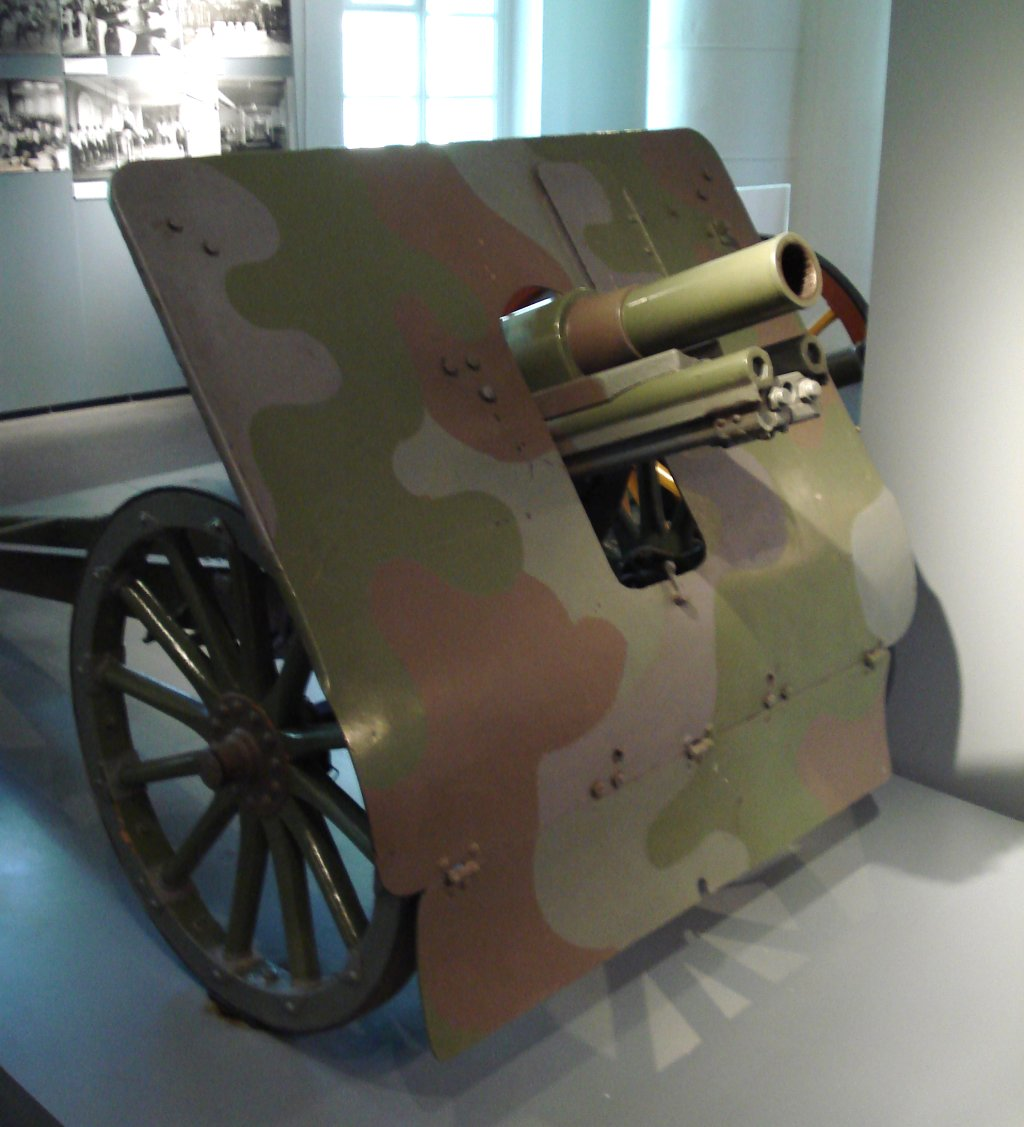
A 76 K/10/13 in Finland.

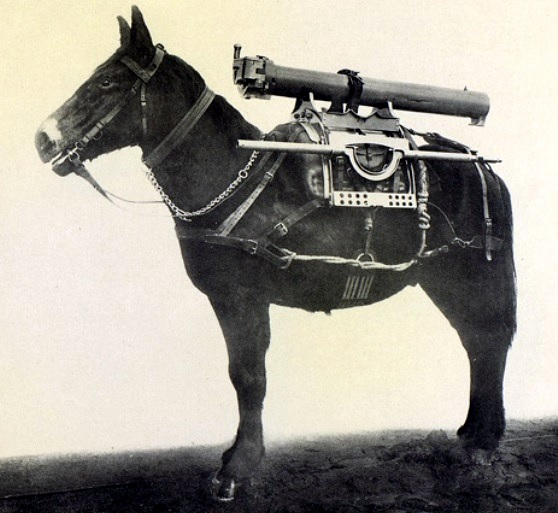
Mule with the barrel.

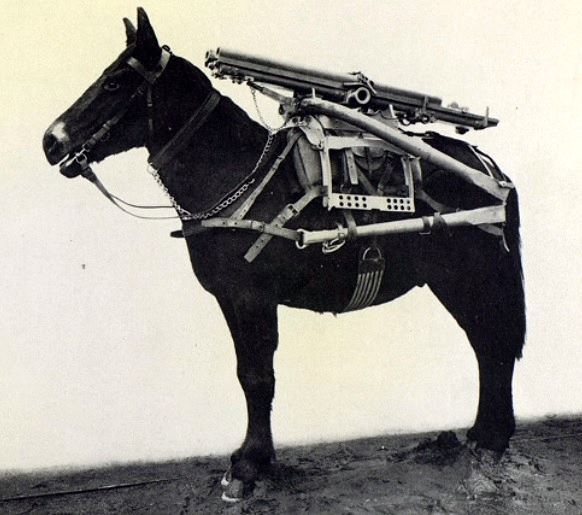
Mule with the recoil mechanism

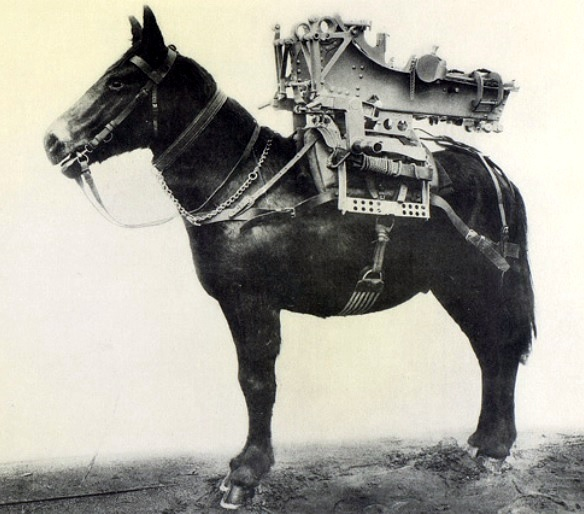
Mule with carriage.

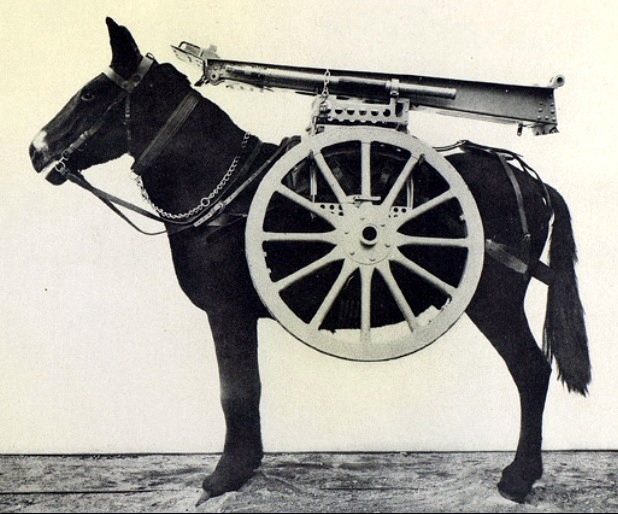
Mule with tail of carriage and wheels.

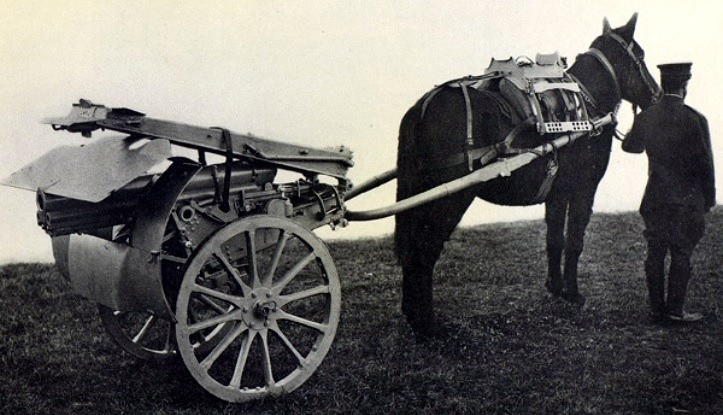
A gun folded for towing.

== Museum examples ==
- Polish Army Museum in Warsaw
- The Artillery Museum of Finland in Hämeenlinna
- Air Defense History Museum in Zarya in Moscow Oblast
- "King Ferdinand" National Military Museum in Bucharest
- Monument in Ukraine in Kyiv
