= 75 mm Krupp-Lykoudis =

The 75 mm Krupp-Lykoudis gun (Greek: Ρυμουλκούμενο πυροβόλο Κρουπ-Λυκούδη διαμετρήματος 75 χιλιοστών) was designed by Petros Lykoudis and developed in collaboration with Krupp.

== History ==
The idea of a detachable cannon for mountain artillery goes back to two officers of the Greek Army: the then Major of Engineers Petros Lykoudis in 1891, who made the first relevant proposal, and later to the then Major of Artillery Panagiotis Danglis, who submitted his own design in 1893.

== The controversy between inventors ==
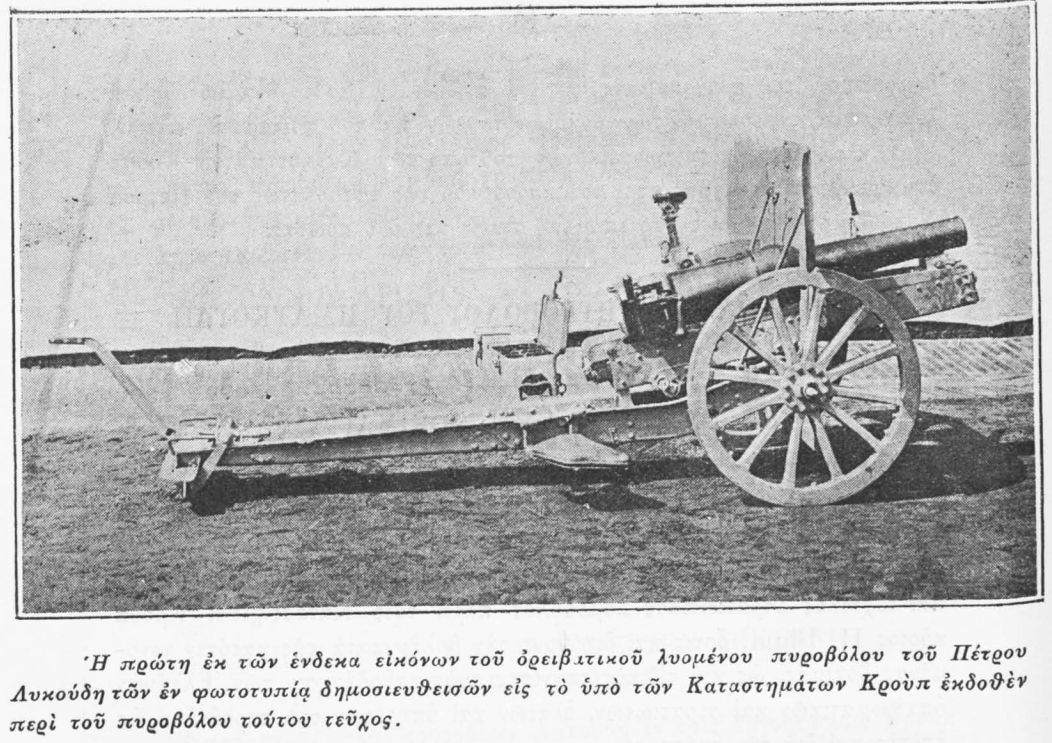
Lykoudis gun

The then peer of Danglis, Lykoudis, had sent the design of the cannon to the German Krupp industry, while Danglis sent his design to the French Schneider. When the Greek army was looking to equip the army with new weapons, Lykoudis (Krupp-Lykoudis) gun was tested along with the Danglis design, with the latter eventually adopted by the Greek Army, which used it from the Balkan Wars until World War II.

== See also ==
- 75 mm Schneider-Danglis 06/09
