= Garford-Putilov armoured car =

Garford–Putilov armoured car
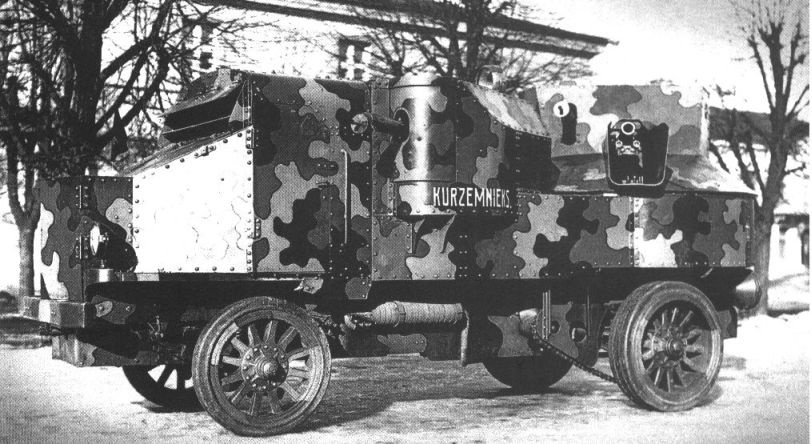
- A Garford–Putilov armoured car in the 1920s
- Type: Armoured car
- Place of origin: Russian Empire

Service history
- In service: 1915–1930s
- Used by: Russian Empire; Russian Republic; RSFSR; Russian State (captured); German Empire (captured); Poland; Latvia (captured)
- Wars: World War I Russian Civil War; German revolution of 1918–1919; Polish-Soviet war Latvian War of Independence

Production history
- Manufacturer: Putilov factory, Saint Petersburg, Russia
- Produced: 1915–1916
- No. built: 48
- Variants: Naval version

Specifications
- Mass: 11 t (12 short tons) Naval; 8.6 t (9.5 short tons) Army
- Length: 5.70 m (18 ft 8 in)
- Width: 2.30 m (7 ft 7 in)
- Height: 2.80 m (9 ft 2 in)
- Crew: 8–9
- Armour: Steel plate body - 6.5mm (army) 9mm (naval) front of turret - 6.5mm (army) 13mm (naval) side of turret - 6.5 (army) 7mm (naval)
- Main armament: 76.2mm Model 1910 "anti-assault" gun
- Secondary armament: 3 x 7.62mm Maxim machine guns
- Engine: 4-cylinder air-cooled petrol engine 30 hp (22 kW) (or 35 hp (26 kW))
- Drive: 2 x 4 (rear wheels driven)
- Suspension: dependent, leaf spring
- Ground clearance: 300 millimetres (12 in)
- Operational range: 120 kilometres (75 miles)
- Maximum speed: 18–20 km/h (11–12 mph)

Garford–Putilov armoured cars were armoured fighting vehicles produced in Russia during the First World War era. They were built on the chassis of Garford Motor Truck Co. Trucks imported from the United States.

Although considered to be a rugged and reliable machine by its users, the Garford–Putilov was severely underpowered. With a total weight of up to 11 tons, and only a 30 hp (22 kW) engine, the vehicles had a top speed of approximately 11–12 mph (18–19 km/h). The design was also top-heavy and therefore had very limited, if any, off-road capability.

Armament consisted of a single 76.2 mm cannon in a turret with 270 degrees of traverse at the rear of the vehicle, and two or three 7.62 mm machine guns. Two of these machine guns were in casemate-like mounts towards the front of the vehicle, but the guns could not provide full frontal cover at short range.

During its production from 1915 to 1916 the Putilov factory produced 48 of these armoured cars which were used during the First World War and the Russian Civil War. They possessed powerful weapons and adequate armour for their class and time and, despite their rather mediocre mobility, were very effective in battle, distinguishing themselves in reliability and construction, giving them a comparatively long service life.

== Development history ==
With the outbreak of the First World War it became more pressing for Russia to develop domestically produced armoured vehicles and by 19 September 1914 the first unit of the Russian Imperial Army equipped with armoured vehicles was sent to the front – the "First Auto-Mobile Machine Gun Company" which used the fully domestically produced machine gun equipped armoured car the "Russo-Balt type C". In order to provide fire support to the armoured cars the company also had three foreign made trucks with artillery guns mounted onto their bodies, one of these, the Mannesmann-MULAG was also armoured. Military use quickly demonstrated the high demand for, and effectiveness of, armoured vehicles in battle, although it became clear at the same time that the "Mannessmann" was not yet sufficiently developed. It was simply a truck with an artillery gun mounted on the back protected by basic armour. As a result, the Main Military Technical Directorate of the Russian Imperial Army took the decision to form new auto-mobile machine gun platoons which would include two machine gun armed vehicles and an armoured vehicle equipped with a cannon which would be more technically advanced than the "Mannessman Mulag".

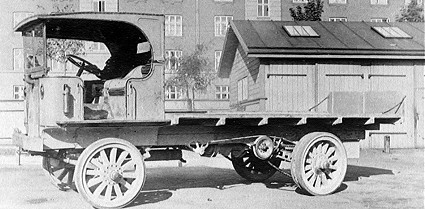
The 5 tonne Garford truck which served as a base for the Garford–Putilov armoured car

Soon after, in the spring of 1914, design work was started at the Putilov factory for a heavy armoured car equipped with a cannon and machine gun and with fully encompassing armour. The initiator and ideological inspirer of the whole process for the creation of armoured cars was Major-General N. M. Filatov, who, at this time occupied the post of head of the Officers Rifle School. According to his concept such a machine should qualitatively strengthen a unit of machine gun armoured vehicles. Filatov personally developed the project for future armoured vehicles. One of his first designs proved to be the most successful. A dual axle, rear wheel drive (4 x 2) five ton truck from the American Garford Motor Truck company, a firm which specialised in the construction of such vehicles, was chosen as the base for the armoured vehicle. There are references in the literature that refer to the use of a truck with a 4-ton carrying capacity but this is unlikely because the Garford motor truck company produced only 5, 3 and 2 ton trucks, moreover of these only the 5 tonners possessed chain drive.

The truck had a maximum speed of 35 km/h and the combined weight of the chassis (without cabin and load bed) was 3931 kg. Garford trucks attracted the attention of Filatov and other military leaders because of their high load capacity, which allowed the use of thicker armour and larger guns, but also because these trucks were already "in hand"; by the middle of December 33 Garfords, purchased by General Sekreteva's commission, had already arrived in Petrograd and were ready and waiting in the garage of the Military Automobile School. Filatov chose a 76mm "counter-assault gun" designed in 1910, which was a conversion of the French 76 mm mountain gun M1909. This was a powerful weapon and its use required significant modifications to the chassis of the Garford truck and presented a whole series of other technical problems. The choice of this weapon was made as a result of comparison trials carried out at Officer's Rifle School on 8 November 1914. As well as the 76mm gun, the 37mm automatic Maxim cannon, the 47mm "quick-firing" Hotchkiss gun and the 5.7 cm Maxim-Nordenfelt were also tested. In essence the Maxim cannon was a larger version of the Maxim machine gun, it did not possess high explosive shells and because of its high rate of fire resulted in a large expenditure of ammunition, explosive shells for the 47mm cannon proved ineffective and the 57mm was not much better than the 47mm and produced too much recoil for the Garford chassis. The 76mm gun used a powerful TNT projectile which was similar to the projectile of a 3-inch field gun and capable of penetrating any armour then in use, but had relatively low recoil and compact dimensions which made it easier to fit to an armoured vehicle. The 76mm cannon also had the benefit of using the same shells as the 3-inch field gun which facilitated supply.

Design work continued until the end of 1915 when the Putlilov Factory received an order for the construction of 30 armoured cars. Construction of the armoured vehicle began in March, and by 16 April the first Garford–Putilov armoured car was sent to an armoured company. Two and a half weeks later, on 3 March 1915, after the formation and training of the crew the new armoured car was sent to the south-western front into the composition of the 5th auto-mobile platoon

== Mass production ==
Mass production of the Garford started at the Putilov factory at the end of March 1915. The order from the main military supply directorate specified the construction of 30 armoured cars. By 20 August 1915, 19 armoured vehicles had already been delivered and a further 11 were in various states of construction. The last vehicle was finished on the 28 September. On the 2 September 1915 the Putilov factory received an order to construct another 18 armoured cars intended for the Navy. These were planned to be used for guarding the Peter the Great's Naval Fortress in the city of Revel (later Tallinn) this "naval Garford" possessed a number of differences to the "Army" version (see below). The extra chassis purchased from America only arrived at Petrograd on the 13 February 1916, which significantly delayed production. As a result, construction was only started in March and the last vehicle was delivered in early December 1916.

== Construction ==
=== Body and turret ===
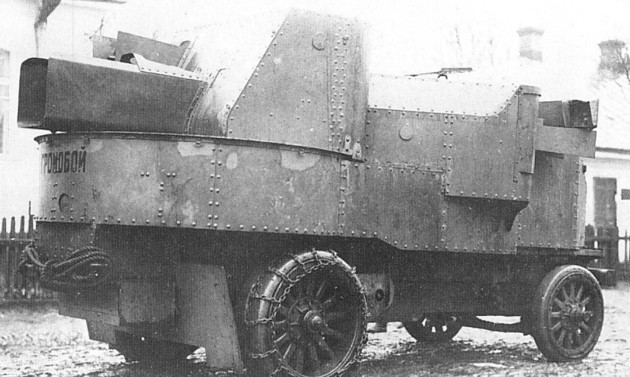
An army variant Garford–Putilov armoured car named "Gromoboi" pictured after repair in 1916. Extra armour has been added to protect the machine guns. Note the chains on the rear wheels to try and improve off-road ability.

The body of the armoured vehicle was designed by N. M. Filatov and was of an unusual construction. Sheets of steel armour 6.5 mm (1/4 inch) thick produced by the Izhora factory were used in the construction of the body. All the sheets of armour were subjected to a test firing from a 7.62mm Russian Mosin rifle M1891 and a 7.92mm German Mauser M1898.

The factory guaranteed protection from armour-piercing rifle rounds from 150 paces and from ordinary rounds at 75 paces. Subsequent battles would show that the armour was also capable of withstanding fire from shorter distances. The armour sheets were rivetted to the metal frame itself fastened to the chassis. The majority of the armour sheets were vertical although a few elements of the bodywork had a slight incline. The functional and technical part of the armoured vehicle was divided into three sections. The control compartment was in the front section. The engine was covered by an armoured hood and the nose section had swinging armoured doors for access to the radiator. Seats for the driver and commander were located on the left and right respectively above the engine and fuel tank. This was extremely dangerous but allowed the overall length of the vehicle to be shorter. For observation the driver and commander had rectangular observation hatches in the front armour plate which were covered by folding armour flaps with adjustable slits. There were round observation hatches in the armoured doors located on the left and right of the bodywork. Finally there was one more hatch in the roof of the control compartment which was used while driving on the road and while not in combat.

External image
- Model projection of a Garford–Putilov

In the middle part of the body was the machine gun fighting compartment. to the left and right were placed small sponsons each of which had a machine gun. The sponsons gave the machine guns a field of fire of 110 degrees. The space between them was occupied by a box for 32 shells and essential tools. In the rear part of the body was the cylindrical turret with a large angled forward plate where the 76mm cannon was located. The weapon could be traversed through 260 degrees. The turret was connected to the forward machine gun section of the vehicle by the lower part of the turret. The upper section of the cannon turret moved on top of this section on a track with the aid of three rollers. In the stowed position the turret was fixed along the axis of the vehicle by two pins located near the rear wheels. Access to the turret was through a two leaf hatch in the top. There was also an internal hatch communicating with the machine gun compartment, through which ammunition could be passed. Besides the main weapon in the front plate of the turret there was a third machine gun. In the walls of the bodywork were small embrasures with armoured covers for observation and shooting personal weapons. The machine gun embrasures and sighting windows for the cannon could also be covered with armoured hatches. The fighting compartment was lined with felt and canvas to avoid injury to the crew from secondary fragments. The machine gun compartment could be screened off from the driver with a canvas curtain and also if necessary with hanging armoured sheets.

=== Armament ===
The main armament of the Garford armoured car was the "3-inch counter-assault gun Model 1910". This was a re-worked version of the 76 mm mountain gun M1909 from which the new gun inherited the barrel and breech. The cannon was installed on a new carriage, lighter than its predecessor but not capable of being disassembled in the same way. Mass production of this armament had started at the Putilov factory in 1911 and continued to the middle of 1915. Altogether in this period 407 guns were produced in two batches. At first these types of guns were used in various fortifications, intended both for defence and to provide fire support to their own troops during sorties. It was considered suitable for installation in the Garford firstly because it provided excellent ballistic characteristics for the time and had low recoil. The shells used in this weapon were normally those from the type 1909 mountain gun but with a smaller charge. The maximum muzzle velocity of the 6.5 kg high explosive shrapnel shell was around 381 m/s which was sufficient to provide effective fire. Canister shot was also available for this weapon with an initial velocity of 274 m/s. The cannon was mounted on the rear part of the vehicle on a pedestal made from welded iron plates. A copper "head" was riveted to the top part of the pedestal, serving as a bearing for a pivot which passed through the pedestal and at the same time serving as a support for the bottom of the rotating part of the turret. The pivot was the axis of rotation for the turret to which it was firmly riveted. At the bottom the pivot was supported by a bronze bearing riveted to the circular section supporting the pedestal. The pedestal was fastened to the platform of the vehicle with 12 bolts. The lower gun mounting was cast out of bronze with an extended trunk of box section on which was installed a bronze arc guide for the upper gun mounting along with a turning mechanism. On the upper wall of the mounting, a little above the arc guide was an opening through which the lifting mechanism screw passed. The front wall of the mounting had a flat, rectangular flange to which was fastened an armoured cowl (which protected the barrel of the gun in the stowed position.) Fire from the cannon was carried out by direct aiming whilst stationary with the aid of a simple optical sight (the gun was not furnished with any sighting arrangement for carrying out indirect fire). The effective range was around 3000m. The vehicle carried 44 shells for the main gun, of these 12 were stored in the turret with the gun and a further 32 were stored in a box in the machine gun compartment. In terms of auxiliary weapons the Garford carried three 7.62mm model of 1910 Maxim machine guns with water cooled barrels. Two machine guns were mounted in the side sponsons and the third in the front plate of the gun turret. Ammunition for the machine guns was provided in belts of 250 rounds. 20 belts of ammunition were carried, or 5000 rounds in total.

=== Engine and transmission ===
The power plant for the armoured car was a 4-cylinder, air-cooled engine with a capacity of 30 horsepower] (in some sources 35 horsepower). The gearbox had four forward gears and 1 reverse. Forwards, the vehicle could reach a speed of 18 km/h, although in reverse the maximum speed was 3 km/h. The latter was a serious problem because the tactics used by armoured vehicles at this time involved them moving backwards towards the front line of the enemy positions, firing at them and then retreating to their original position; for this reason placing cannons at the rear of the vehicles was considered preferable. As a result, it was essential to provide the vehicle with sufficient speed in both directions. To this end a special coupling was installed in the transmission, operated from a lever in the drivers compartment. With the aid of this coupling, when necessary, a complete reversal of the gearbox could take place, with all four forward gears becoming reverse and the reverse gear becoming forwards. In order to see while driving backwards the driver used a device similar to a periscope mounted on the right side of the cabin (in battle this proved to be ineffectual). Starting the engine could be accomplished from outside with the aid of a starting handle, as well as from inside by means of an electric starter. The fuel capacity was 6 poods (roughly equal to 98 kg or 132.4 litres). The vehicle also possessed a tank for water, which was also sometimes used as an additional fuel tank.

=== Chassis ===
The chassis of the vehicle had two axles with dependent leaf spring suspension. The attachment point for the rear springs was protected by additional armour. The vehicle was of a 4 x 2 arrangement, with the drive applied at the rear wheels. Power was transferred to the rear wheels by means of roller chains, which were protected by armoured casings. The wheels were of an artillery type with wooden spokes and cast rubber tyres. The vehicle had single wheels each side at the front and dual wheels at the rear. Chains could be added to the wheels to increase off-road capability (see photo above).

=== Additional equipment ===
Internal lighting of the vehicle was provided by electric lamps powered from a battery. The onboard system ran on 12v. In the event of the onboard electrical system going out of service normal kerosene lamps could be used instead. External illumination was provided by a pair of lights installed on the front of the vehicle, if necessary these could be protected by armoured covers. Some of the Garfords were equipped with an additional pair of lights and also a spotlight on a mounting in front of the gun turret. A horn was provided for giving audible signals.

== Crew ==
The crew of the Garford–Putilov consisted of 8–9 people, although the functions of the crew could vary. Only the commander and drivers duties were strictly defined. The side-mounted machine guns were served by two people each (a gunner and an assistant) although, in principle, each machine gun could be served by one person.

The gun crew consisted of two to three people (the aimer, the loader and if the ninth member of the crew was present an ammunition carrier), and when necessary one of the gun crew could fire the machine gun installed in the gun turret. Although in battle simultaneous operation of both side machine guns and the main gun rarely occurred.

Therefore, the free machine gunner assistants could switch to the gun crew, the need for an ammunition carrier disappeared and most often the crew consisted of 8 people. After the establishment of the rear drivers position requiring a permanent second driver (see below) the functions of the machine gunners was slightly altered, the position of head of the machine gun department appeared, a second gunner would be left on the machine guns and when necessary the third gunner would assist the gun crew and during battle would pass them artillery rounds.

== Modification ==
Immediately after the first use of the Garford in battle it became clear that successfully moving in reverse during battle was practically impossible. It was difficult for the driver to drive such a heavy and unwieldy vehicle, using only the built in rear view mirror. The logical choice was to equip the Garford with a rear driving position. By the middle of 1915 field repair workshops had already carried out a few modernisations on their own initiative; under primitive field conditions they had equipped four of the armoured cars with secondary control posts in the rear of the vehicles. At the Putilov factory around the same time they received an order from the Commission on Armoured Vehicles instructing them to equip all Garfords with rear control positions, both those under construction at the factory and those already in service with the army. The first rear control unit was ready by the end of January 1916, after which it was tested on one of the armoured cars.

The rear controls consisted of a seat sideways to a removable steering wheel; the rear driver looking through a narrow slit in the armour. A communication tube was provided "for the transmission of commands..changing speed, operating the clutch, breaking and accelerating from the rear driver to the front" During 1916 this work was gradually completed.

== Naval Garford ==
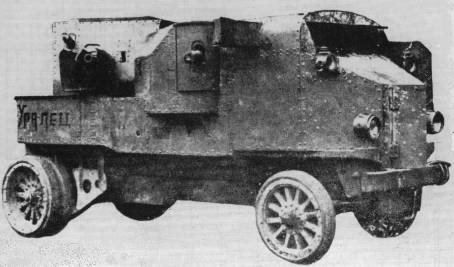
"Uralets", Naval variant of the Garford–Putilov armoured car, 1916

Ordered in September 1915 by the naval department, the Naval Garfords possessed a number of differences from the Army version. A number of sources indicate that instead of the standard chassis the naval Garfords used a lengthened chassis of the new 5 ton truck from the Garford Motor Truck Co., apparently possessing a more powerful engine (35 horsepower (26 kW)). This allowed the strengthening of the armour of the body to 7 – 9 mm and the turret to 8 – 13 mm although the hull configuration remained the same. As well as this the ammunition capacity was raised to 60 rounds and the machine gun supplies to 36 belts (9000 rounds). Because of these changes the mass of the vehicle grew from 8.6 tons to 11 tons. Although because of the use of the stronger chassis and larger engine the increased mass of the machine hardly changed the speed and handling of the vehicle. All the Naval Garfords were also equipped with a rear control unit.

== Former operators ==
- Russian Empire — Used from 1915 to 1917 in the First World War
- German Empire — Used captured vehicles from the Russian army.
- Soviet Russia — Captured from the Russian army during the October Revolution and the Russian Civil War.
- Russian State — Captured from the Red army during the Russian Civil War.
- Czechoslovakia — Captured from the Red Army during the Russian Civil War.
- Latvia — Captured or deserted from the Red Army during the Latvian War of Independence
- Second Polish Republic — Captured from the Red Army during the Polish–Soviet War.
- Estonia — One vehicle captured from the Red Army
- Romania — One vehicle inherited from the Russian Imperial Army

== Operation and combat use ==
=== Personnel and organisational structure ===
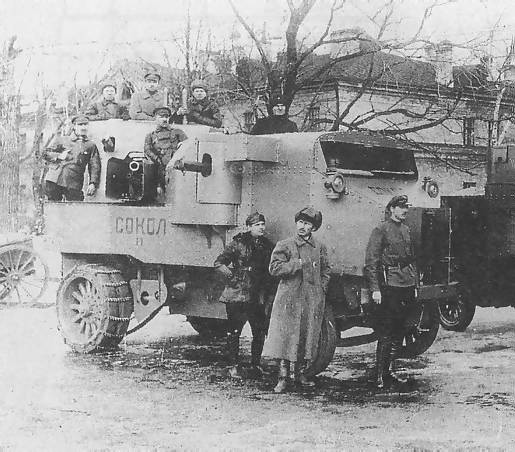
Naval variant Garford–Putilov armoured car "Sokol" (Falcon) spring of 1917

The Garfords came into service with the Автомобильный Пулемётный Взвод - АПВ, Avtomobilnii Pulemotnii Vzvod - APV ("machine gun auto-mobile platoons" in accordance with government order No. 20. Each of these sub units consisted of two machine gun-armed Austin Armoured Cars and one "Garford" type cannon-machine gun armoured vehicle (some platoons possessed three machine gun armoured cars), as well as auxiliary technical trucks, light cars, tanker trucks, motorized workshops and motorcycles. In total the army Garfords were in service with 30 machine gun auto-mobile platoons. Practically all of the armoured cars in the machine gun auto-mobile platoons was assigned a name. Examples include Graf Rumyantsev «Граф Румянцев»- Count Rumyantsev in the 24th Platoon or Gromoboi «Громобой»- "thunderbolt". The naval Garfords were attached to the armoured artillery division as part of the land front of the Peter the Great sea fortress. Many of these were also given names.

=== First World War ===
Starting in 1915 the Garford–Putilov armoured vehicles were used by units of the Imperial Russian Army on practically all parts of the Russian-German front during the First World War. Despite the somewhat weak speed and control characteristics, particularly off-road and on soft ground, the Garfords were popular amongst the troops, mainly because of the powerful 76mm gun. The following extracts are from reports of auto-mobile machine gun platoon commanders who fought at the front in 1915.

"On the night of the 20th and 21st of October the platoon entrusted to my control took part in a reconnaissance in force by the 408th regiment. In accordance with the orders of the regimental commander the armed vehicle "Grozny" and the machine gun vehicle "Adskii" were to support the regiment's attack during their approach to the enemies defensive line. Having received the order by phone to move the vehicles forward I gave instructions regarding the operation to the commander of the "Grozny", sub lieutenant Ter-Akapov and the commander of the "Adskii" sub lieutenant Isaev. The Grozny and the Adskii were moved forward simultaneously. Having approached the enemy trenches "Grozny" opened fire, opening fire with all the machine guns was not possible due to the danger of hitting our own troops. During the battle "Grozny" and "Adskii" were under intense enemy artillery and machine gun fire. When the reconnaissance had finished our troops started to withdraw behind the river Putilovka, I ordered "Grozny" to cover the withdrawal of our troops with cannon fire and resist the enemies transition to the counter attack. I consider the actions of the platoon officials worthy of reward."

— Guard Captain Platkovskii, Commander of the 15th Machine Gun Auto-mobile platoon.

""Gromoboi" had travelled about 70 Verst, moreover he had run well, taking steep climbs easily, for example near the village of Podgoritsa. This slope is twice as steep as that at Putilovskii."

— Lieutenant Krasnopolskii, Commander of the cannon section of the 20th Machine Gun Auto-mobile Platoon.

"With the occupation of the village of Teofipolki the armoured car "Pushkar" under the command of Staff Captain Shultz and Lieutenant Pleshkova arrived at the western outskirts. "Pushkar" bombarded the enemies artillery observation point near the village of Viktorovka, after which the enemy artillery fire ceased. Noticing a column of cavalry with a horse battery moving southwards, "Pushkar" fired at them, after which the column turned back and disappeared at the quarry . . . The next fire from the "Pushkar" dispersed the entrenching enemy on the ridge the north west of Viktorovka."

— Staff Captain Shultz, Commander of the 19th Machine Gun Auto-mobile Platoon.

"A cannon in an armoured unit is essential. The existing 3 inch cannon is indispensable for its ballistic qualities. Despite the large burden which the Garford presents because of its low power and slow speed compared to the rest of the platoon, it is unavoidable to come to the conclusion that it is necessary to continue to issue Garford armoured cars, provided that it is provided with rear steering."

— Captain Svetskovskii, Commander of the 13th Machine Gun Auto-mobile Platoon

Naval Garfords took an active part in fighting at Reval (modern day Tallinn) during the final stages of the First World War. For example, naval versions issued to the 1st Siberian Rifle Corps with the names "Revelets" and "Nepobedimii" supported the 11th and 77th rifle regiments which were defending the capes of Olay, Rolbum, Borenberg and Radenpreis until the end of 1917. Subsequently, because of the collapse of the army and the general retreat, both armoured vehicles were abandoned, however "Nepobedimii" fell into German hands in nearly serviceable condition and after small repairs was put back into service. In early October 1917 two naval Garfords took part in the battle of Moonsund during which they supported the Naval death battalion of Captain of the first rank P. Shishko, defending the Orisaarskii dam. During the retreat both armoured vehicles were blown up to prevent their capture by the enemy. It is interesting to note that even though they were actively used in battle the "Garfords" did not suffer heavy losses. In August 1916 commanders of Machine Gun Auto-mobile Platoons reported that

". . . all of the Garfords were damaged (struck by bullets, explosive bullets and shrapnel) whilst taking part in battle but there were no holes. There were cases in battle where Garfords approached to 200 paces or less. . ."

from the start of 1917 unrecoverable losses of Garfords amounted to only 7 out of 48 machines, or around 15%.

=== Civil War ===
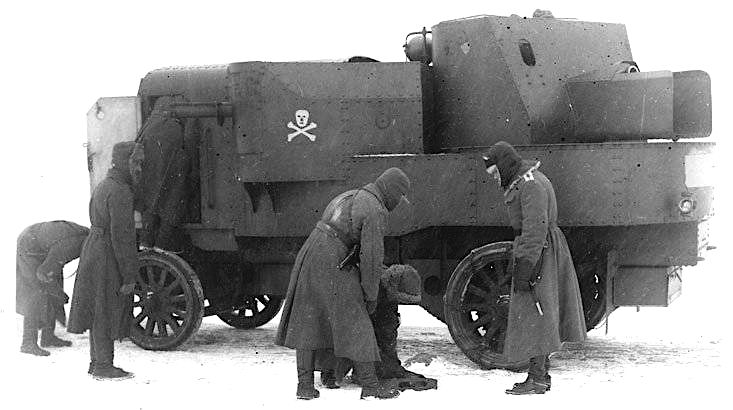
Garford–Putilov armoured car at the front in 1917. Note the skull and crossbones motif on the side, a symbol of the Russian Death Battalions (assault battalions).

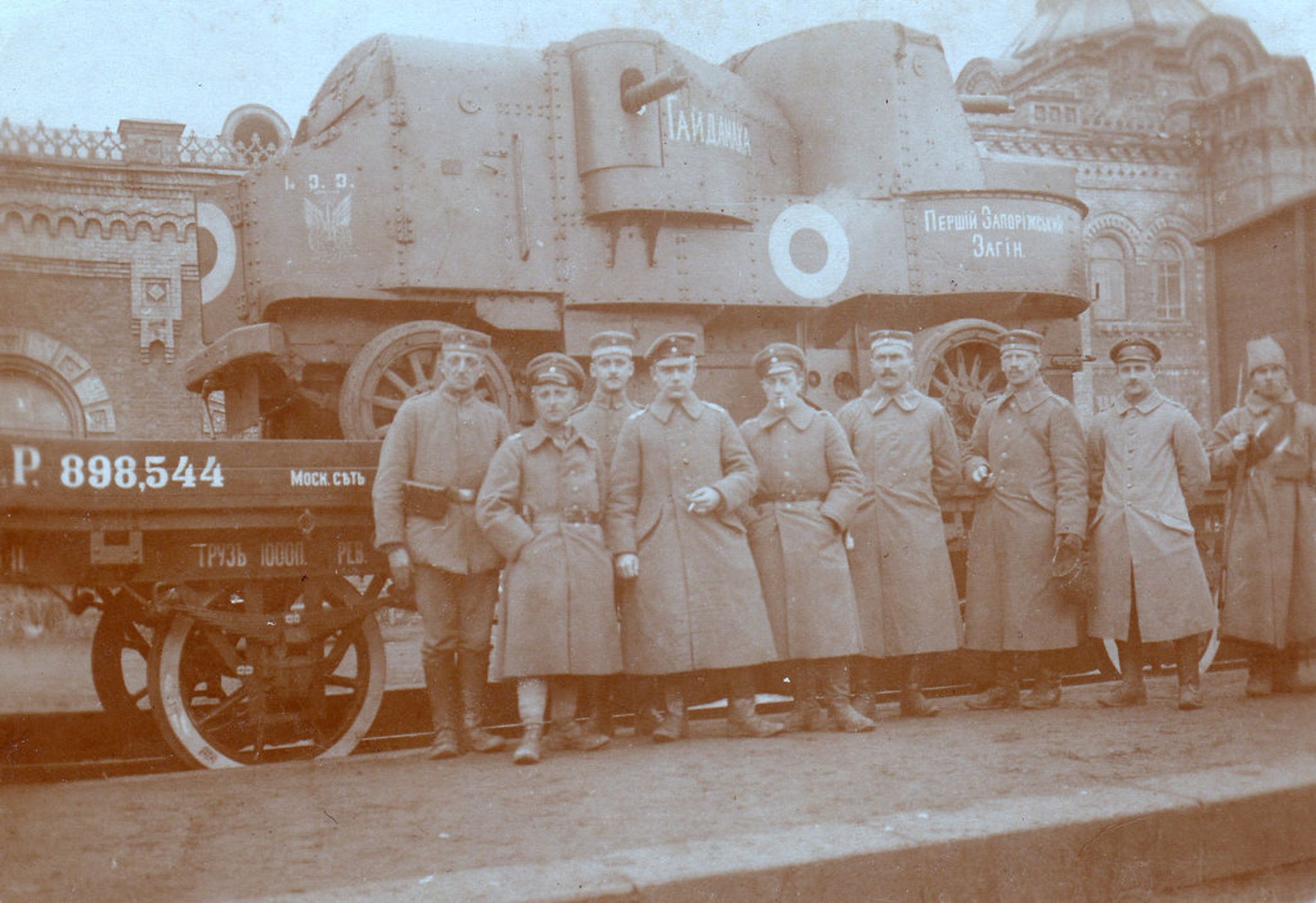
Garford–Putilov armoured car "Gaydamak"

After the February Revolution and the beginning of internal conflict within the army the Garfords began to be gradually withdrawn from the front. Later with the coming to power of the Bolsheviks, the Garford–Putilov armoured cars, like other armoured vehicles possessed by the army, were quickly seized by opposing sides in the civil war, although more of them ended up with the Bolsheviks. The Yaroslavl Uprising starting in July 1918 could be considered one of the first uses of the Garfords in the civil war. Despite having only a small force, rebels in the form of volunteers and detachments of the local police managed to establish control over Yaroslavl for a few days, completely clearing the town of Bolsheviks. On the 6 July they were joined by the armoured division of lieutenant Supponin including 25 officers, several machine guns and two Garford–Putilov armoured cars. Despite their initial success the uprising did not receive the necessary support from the White Army which was operating at that time in central Russia. By the 12 July the Reds had brought up heavy artillery, armoured trains and even some aircraft and begun a systematic siege of the city. During the defence of the city the Garfords were used as mobile strongpoints although a lack of ammunition did not allow them to be used effectively. Yaroslavl fell on the 21 July. The Garfords were most likely captured by units of the Red Army.

Subsequently, Garfords took part in practically all of the large engagements during the civil war with both sides. Many of the vehicles were renamed in accordance with the preferences of their new owners so that armoured cars with the names "Karl Marx" and "Trotsky" might be fighting against "Kornilovets" or "Drozdovets".

In 1920 the 42nd Consolidated Heavy Armoured "Plastun" detachment of the Red Army which was operating at the Kakhovka bridgehead (ru) contained six Garfords, "Antikhrist" ("antichrist"), "Moshni" ("powerful"), "Krasnii Bogatyr" (Red Bogatyr), "Pygachev" (probably named for Yemelyan Pugachev ) and two vehicles of unknown names. In tight defensive conditions, which were generally uncharacteristic of the Russian Civil War, the Reds used the Garfords of the 42nd armoured detachment as a mobile anti-tank reserve against British-made tanks which at that time were part of the make up of the White forces. The armoured vehicles of the Red Army operated quite effectively although at least one Garford of the 42nd Armoured Detachment was destroyed. Apart from this there is known to have been one more Garford included in the defensive forces of the bridgehead and likely the cannon equipped armoured car "Mgrebrov-white". With the defeat of the White Army more Garfords fell into the hands of the Red Army and, in the end, of the 48 Garfords built at least 30 were in the Red Army.

=== After the Civil War ===
By December 1921 only 26 of these 30 Garfords are accounted for in the records, of these 15 were working and 11 were undergoing repair. Practically all of the armoured vehicles were worn out, especially the chassis. They were particularly affected by the complete lack of spare parts, which could only be purchased overseas. In view of this the decision was taken in 1923 to completely change the chassis of the vehicles to ones suitable for use on train tracks thus turning them into armoured rail cars. This task was carried out at the Bryansk Machine-building Plant, where 21 Garfords were sent (however it is not known whether all of them were refurbished). In 1931 the commission of the Armoured Vehicle Directorate issued an order for the decommissioning of all obsolete types of armoured vehicles including the Garfords. Curiously the order contains information about 27 armoured vehicles of the Garford–Putilov type, this figure does not agree with the data from 1921 or 1923 (26 and 21 vehicles in existence respectively). One way or another during the 1930s all the Garfords were dismantled, usable armour and chassis were transferred for use by the Red Army and unsuitable ones were sent to the Military Funds Bureau. A number of publications suggest the use of Garford–Putilovs by the Red Army during the Second World War, this is only indirectly indicated by a few German photographs showing captured "trophy" Garfords both serviceable and damaged. Although it is impossible to establish the time and place that the photographs were taken, it is reasonable to believe that the photographs depict Garfords captured by the German Army during the First World War.

== Captured vehicles ==
During World War 1 and the Russian Civil War several Garfords ended up with Russia's enemies and countries formed after the collapse of the Russian Empire.

=== Germany ===
captured by the German army. "Kokampf" Division, Berlin, spring 1919. It has been rearmed with a German MG 08 machine gun.

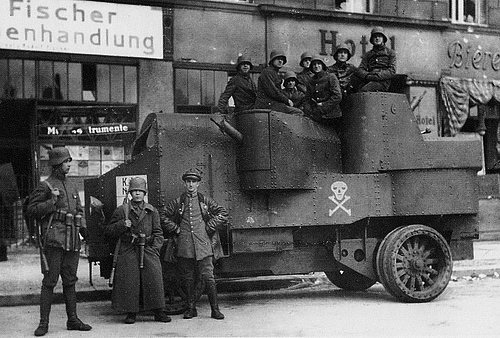
Garford–Putilov in the German Freikorps in 1919

During 1916–1918 German forces captured at least five Garfords. Captured vehicles were taken to the rear for repair. at least three Garfords were rearmed with German machine guns (probably the MG 08) and included in the German Armoured Division Kokampf. During the German revolution and surrounding unrest of 1918–1921, these Garfords were used to suppress communist riots in large German cities. In particular, at the start of 1919 Garfords took part in military actions in Berlin. After bringing domestically produced armoured vehicles into service the Garfords were put into storage and after some time disposed of. Captured Garfords are depicted in a series of German photographs. Most often these photographs show a navy Garford named Nepobedimyi ("invincible") which was abandoned by Russian forces.

=== Czechoslovakia ===
Soldiers of the Czechoslovak Corps captured three Bolshevik armored cars, including a Garford named Groznyi, in Penza on May 28, 1918. Groznyi was captured at the train station on a flat car and then served as the gun carriage of the eponymous improvised armoured train. It was lost on 2 October 1918 in the Battle of the Alexandrovsky Bridge over the Volga near Syzran.

=== Poland ===
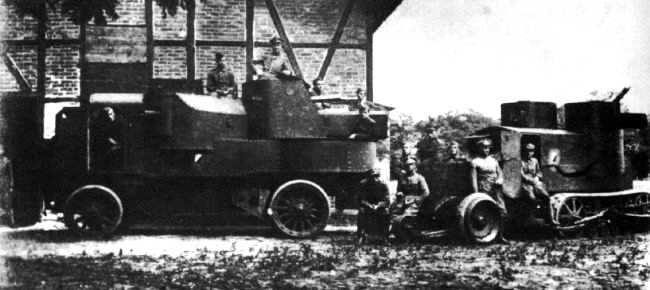
Captured Garford–Putilov (probably "Dziadek") and an Austin-Kegresse in the Polish army; spring 1921

During the breakup of the Russian Empire and the ensuing Soviet-Polish war the Poles received a considerable amount of military equipment from the former Russian Imperial Forces, amongst which were three Garford–Putilov armoured cars. The first Garford (Bayan, army variant) was captured by the Polish Army in February 1919 in the region of Volodymyr-Volynskyi/Kovel. In the Polish Army this machine received the ironic name of "Grandfather" (Polish: Dziadek). An armoured platoon was quickly formed around the basis of this vehicle, the Pluton Pancerny "Dziadek". On 21 March 1920 whilst repelling an attack by the 58th Rifle Division near Zhitomir, the crew of "Grandfather" managed to knock out a Red Army Austin-Kegresse Austin armoured car half-track armoured vehicle, which also became a Polish trophy. On 26 March near Korostyshev, "Grandfather" was hit by artillery fire and was out of action for a short time. Most likely it was this same Garford that took part in the hunt for a Red Army Austin which broke into the area of Zhitomir and single-handedly fought against superior Polish forces. A second armoured vehicle was seized around this time and brought into service with the armoured platoon, receiving the name " Zagłoba" (in honour of a character from the novel "With Fire and Sword" by H. Sienkiewicz). A third Garford (a naval variant called "Uralets") was taken by the Poles in battle on the Bobruisk – Mogilev highway near the village of Stolopisch. Moreover, according to Polish records, during the infantry attack they managed to destroy a Red Army Fiat and a Lanchester armoured car as well as damage one other of unknown type. The Garford was captured after falling into a ravine from which the crew were unable to extract it on their own. The Poles recovered it and towed it to Bobruisk where it was repaired. Later the armoured car, which received the name "General Szeptycki", was included in the Wielkopolski pluton samochodów pancernych ("Wiekopolski Armoured Vehicle Platoon"). A short while later the "General Szeptycki" was sent to Warsaw where it was at the disposal of the 3rd Armoured Division, and in 1921 it ended up in Grodno. According to materiel inventories in 1925 all three machines were transferred to Kraków where they were put into the 5th Armoured Division. But by this time the armoured vehicles were thoroughly worn out and in 1927 the Garfords were taken out of service by the Polish Army and at the start of the 1930s were gradually dismantled.

=== Latvia ===
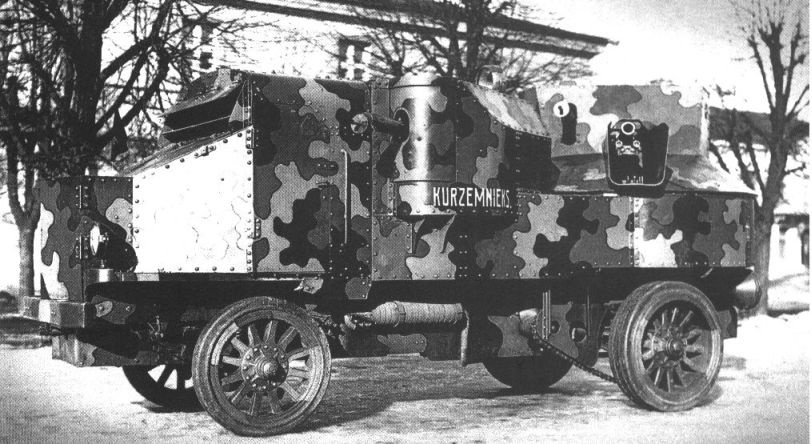
Captured Garford–Putilov "Kurzemnieks" in the Latvian army in 1920. The vehicle is newly painted in camouflage colours.

It is not clear how Garfords fell into the hands of the Latvians. According to the most reliable information at least one armoured vehicle of this type was captured by the Red Army in the course of battles during November and December 1918, when Russian Bolsheviks were attempting to establish soviet power in Latvia which was trying to breakaway from the Russian Soviet Federative Socialist State. In the early stages the Latvians were helped by the Germans and by June 1919 Landeswehr and volunteer units had managed to clear Latvia of Reds and penetrated into the territory of Estonia. However, a new conflict soon arose in Latvia amongst the former allies. Soon in the region of the city Cēsis a united Latvian-Estonian force succeeded in destroying part of the Landeswehr under the command of Major Fletcher. However three months later the Germans again invaded Latvian territory. This time with the West Russian Volunteer Army of General Bermondt-Avalov, formed in Germany from German volunteers and captured Russian officers. By the 9 October 1919 the German "Iron Division" had reached the Mitava-Riga highway in the course of a successful offensive deep into the country. Here the Germans came under fire from a Latvian Garford by the name of "Lacplesis", which was covering the withdrawal of Latvian forces. Taking advantage of the low speed of the machine one of the Bavarian-German officers jumped aboard and with a few shots from his pistol through the viewing slots killed the driver and commander. Out of control, the Garford ran into a ditch and the remaining crew surrendered. The captured Garford was quickly included in the German Freikorps and used in battle against its former owners on the approach to Riga. Further information about the Garford diverges, according to some reports the armoured car was sent to Germany where it was used against the rebellious Spartacus League and finally was dismantled for scrap. According to other data (supported by photographs) after the defeat of the Western Volunteer army in November 1919 all of the Freikorps's armoured vehicles, including the former "Lacplesis", went to the Latvians. The Garford continued to bear German markings for some time and was then renamed to "Kurzemnieks". So during this time the Latvians possessed only one Garford which changed its name twice during 1919. Subsequently, this armoured car was used by the Latvian army and at the start of the 1930s due to heavy wear and tear was put into temporary storage. In 1940, after Latvia joined the USSR, the mothballed, and in principle still serviceable, Garford was discovered by the Soviet Military Commission. Although, most likely, the heavily worn vehicle was scrapped and consequently could not be used in battle during 1941.

=== Other countries ===
In the 1920s Estonia and Romania possessed one Garford each. The Estonian Garford was initially used by Red forces and was captured by the forces of General Yudenich during the attack on Petrograd. Consequently, during the withdrawal and evacuation of Yudenich's forces this vehicle fell to the Estonian army. Romania inherited one Garford from the 4th armoured division of the Russian Army, which fought on the Romanian front.

== Assessment of the Garford–Putilov ==
Garford–Putilov armoured car. Photograph taken in the spring of 1918 in the Baltic region. By all appearances this is a vehicle captured by the German army.

On the whole, the Garford–Putilov armoured cars correspond to the time in which they were made and compare very favourably to other armoured vehicles from the First World War. Poor cross country ability and slow speed were characteristic of cannon armed armoured cars from this period, heavily armoured and armed trucks were almost always overloaded and the presence of only one driven axle and simple cast tyres on thin wheels only made the situation worse. Although the armour, which was quite adequate for the time, and the powerful 76mm anti-assault cannon were good enough that the military forgave the Garford its poor handling and speed. In particular the majority of reports by commanders of the APV in 1916 can be reduced to the following points.

1. 3 inch cannon, excellent

2. projectiles and shrapnel, excellent

3. It is necessary to lighten the system (to as little as 400 poods (6.5 tonnes)

4. It is necessary to have a powerful engine (more than 40 hp)

5. It is necessary to be able to achieve a speed of 40 versts (around 42 km/h).

6. It is necessary to be able to gain easy access to the engine for inspection and repair.

In terms of armour and armament the military were completely satisfied but problems with the manoeuvrability and speed of the Garford would continue to affect them for their whole service life and meant that the Garford was unsuitable for escorting cavalry or for tactical manoeuvre, as a result the Garfords were mainly used as static firing points, or used the simple tactic of driving towards the forward line of the enemy, firing and then retreating again. In rare cases Garfords accompanied advancing infantry although there was no question of Garfords being able to overcome enemy fortifications (except perhaps barbed wire). Garfords would get stuck in even small trenches and were often unable to climb any sort of steep slope. These problems dictated the need for able drivers and commanders who were capable of showing caution and discretion. On the other hand, the Garfords were reliable in service and well built. This is attested to by the fact that even during the conditions of the war and revolution when foreign spare parts and trained mechanics were virtually unobtainable, the Garfords continued to be actively used and suffered almost no losses to technical faults.

== Surviving examples ==
External image
- Model of a Garford–Putilov in a museum

No examples of the Garford–Putilov survive. In the "Horse Power" (Russian: Лошадиная Сила / Loshadinaya Sila) museum in St. Petersburg there is scale model of a Garford. Apart from this there is a 1910 pattern 76mm cannon on a static mount of the same type as that used in the Garford in the Military History Museum of Artillery, Engineers and Communications troops in Saint Petersburg.
