= Austin armoured car =

British WWI armoured vehicle

Austin armoured car, 3rd series
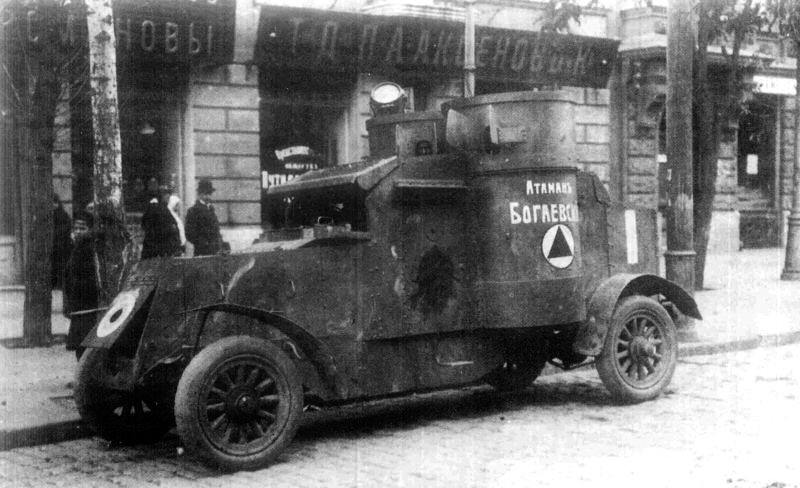
- Austin 3rd series used by the Don Army forces, 1919
- Type: Armoured car
- Place of origin: United Kingdom

Service history
- Used by: United Kingdom; Russian Empire

Specifications
- Mass: 5.3 t
- Length: 190 in (4.9 m)
- Width: 6 ft 8 in (2.03 m)
- Height: 9 ft 4 in (2.84 m)
- Crew: 4 or 5
- Armour: 3–6 mm
- Main armament: 2 x machine guns (Maxim or Hotchkiss)
- Engine: Austin 4-cylinder inline, 4 stroke, water cooled gasoline engine 50 hp (37 kW)
- Power/weight: 9.5 hp/ton
- Transmission: 4 speed, 1 reverse gearbox
- Suspension: 4x2 wheel
- Operational range: 125 mi (201 km) radius of action
- Maximum speed: 35 mph (56 km/h)

The Austin armoured car was a British armoured car produced during the First World War. The vehicle is best known for its employment by the Imperial Russian Army in the First World War and by different forces in the Russian Civil War.

In addition to the British-built Austins, a few dozens of vehicles were manufactured in Russia in 1918–20. These are usually referred to as Austin-Putilov or – if fitted with a Kégresse halftrack chassis – Austin-Kégresse.

== Production history ==
=== British Austins ===
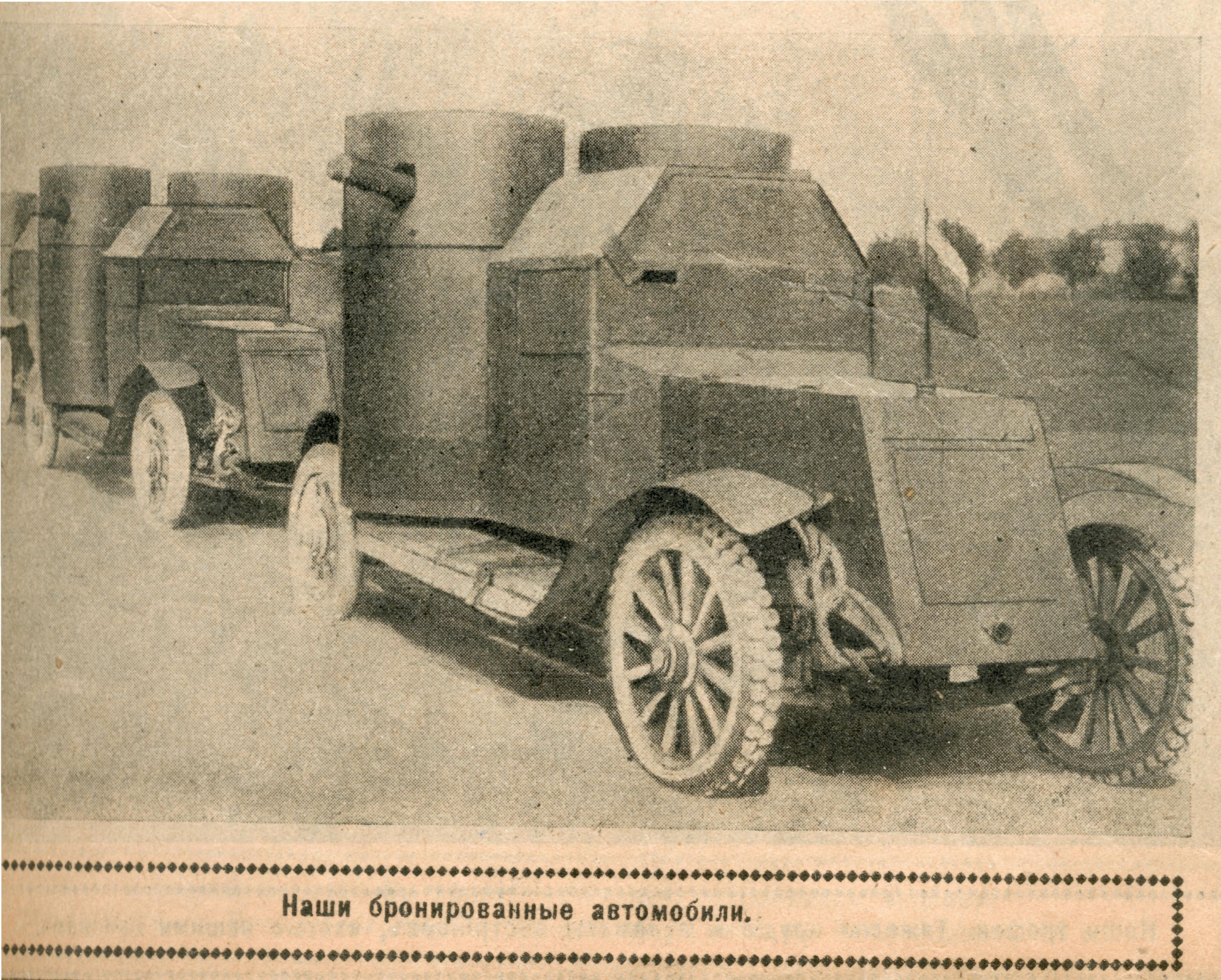
Austins 1st series.

In August 1914, just after the beginning of the First World War, the army of the Russian Empire started to form armoured car units. Due to limited production capabilities of the country's automotive industry it was decided to order a number of vehicles abroad. A committee was sent to the United Kingdom, but failed to find an armoured car that met their requirements for overhead protection and two machine gun turrets.

To meet these requirements, the Austin Motor Company designed a new armoured car. The vehicle, known as Austin 1st series, was based on a passenger car chassis with rear-axle drive. Wheels were wooden, spoked, with pneumatic tyres and an additional set of wheels with full rubber tyres for use in combat was carried. Two Maxim machine guns were mounted in separate turrets placed on both sides of the hull behind the driver's cab. The vehicle was protected by armour plates 3.5–4 mm thick screwed to a body frame. The crew of four – commander, driver and two gunners – could enter or leave the vehicle via a door on the left side of the cab or via big two-leaf rear door. On 29 September 1914, 48 armoured cars were ordered. One car cost 1,150 pounds. After arrival in Russia the front and turret armour was replaced with 7 mm plates. First combat experience, however, revealed that the protection was still too weak and the vehicles were fully rearmoured at Izhorski Works, Izhorsk. The improved armour made the Austins much heavier, resulting in limited mobility and occasionally chassis damage. However, the car was still considered more successful than alternative designs by, among others, Armstrong Whitworth, Renault and Sheffield-Simplex.

On 6 March 1915 the Russians ordered 60 vehicles of an improved design, known as Austin 2nd series. This time the chassis of a 1.5 ton truck with a more powerful engine was used. The hull was shorter, with thicker armour, the driver's cab roof was modified to improve machine guns' angle of fire. Less welcome was the removal of the rear access door. The army also decided it wanted a rear driving post, so after arrival to Russia all vehicles were fitted with a redesigned rear hull section, which housed a second driving post and additional hatch. Another upgrade was the addition of side shields to the machine guns.

Sixty units of Austin 3rd series were ordered on 25 August 1916. The vehicles were similar in characteristics to the 2nd series, but had modified rear hull with driving post, MG shields, bulletproof glass in the front vision slots and lacked big side windows.

Yet another version, with strengthened chassis and double rear wheels, sometimes referred to as Austin model 1918, was ordered in 1917 but due to events in Russia none were delivered.

=== Russian Austins ===
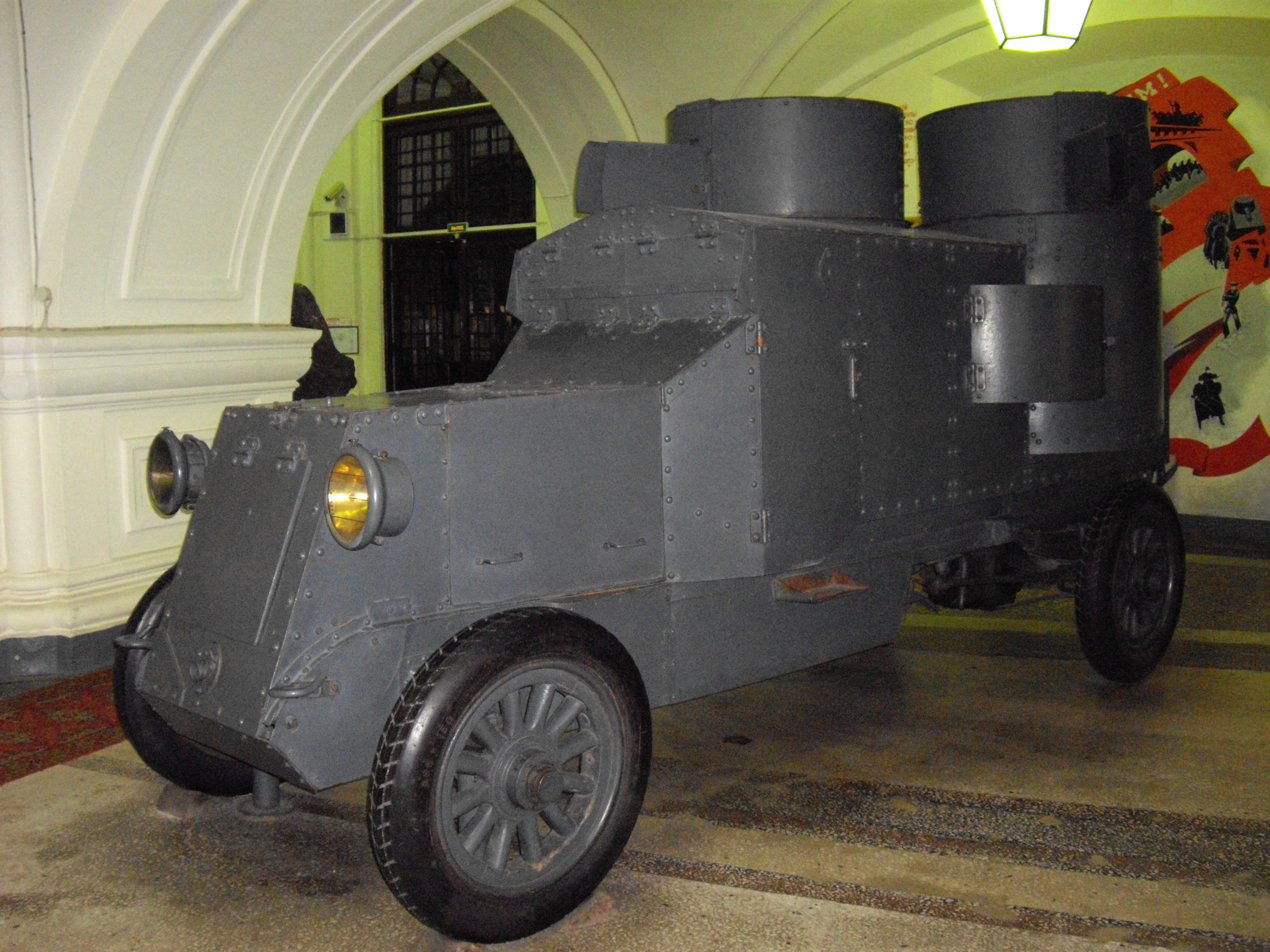
Austin-Putilov in the Artillery Museum, Saint-Petersburg

In 1916 a decision was made to produce a Russian armoured car on the well known Austin chassis. Sixty chassis units – identical to those used in 3rd series – were ordered from Austin. The mission of building armoured hulls was entrusted to Putilovski Works, Saint Petersburg. It was planned to build the cars by July 1917, but work was virtually brought to halt by the February Revolution and the subsequent chaos. Not until March 1918 were the first cars produced. Later the production was transferred to Izhorski Works. A total of 33 vehicles were produced in 1918–1920. In contemporary Russian documents the model was referred to as Russian Austin (Russian: Русский Остин – Russkij Ostin), but eventually became better known as Austin-Putilov (Russian: Остин-Путиловец – Ostin-Putilovets).

Twelve hulls identical to those of Austin-Putilov were mounted on a Kégresse halftrack chassis, resulting in vehicles known as Austin-Kégresse. Production continued from July 1919 until March 1920 when it was stopped by shortage of materials and parts.

Russian Austins' most obvious features were diagonally placed MG turrets (in order to reduce width) and additional right side door. They also had MG mounts with better elevation and other minor improvements.

== Service history ==
=== Russia ===
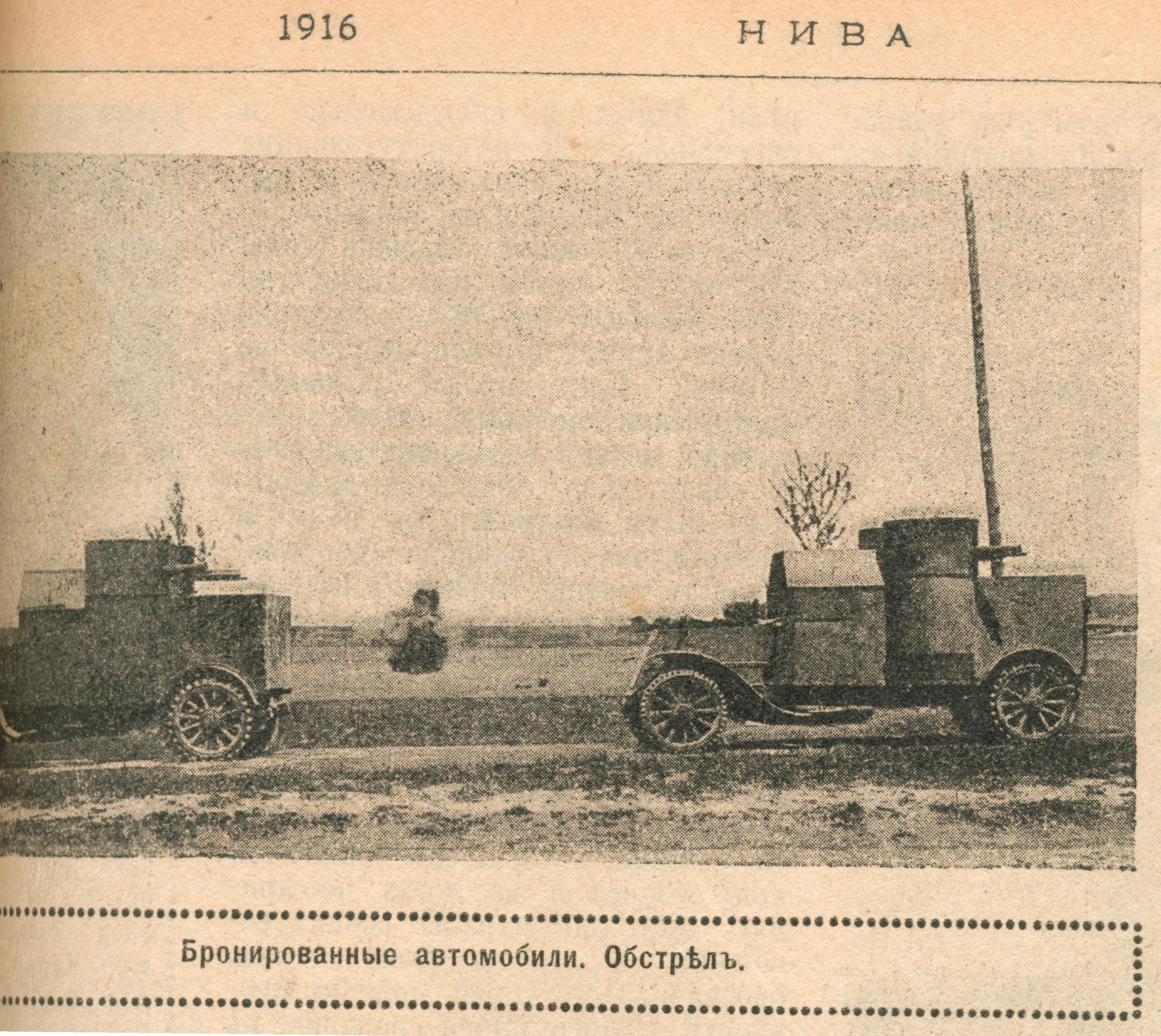
Austins (1st series) of the Russian Army during First World War

Arrival of the 1st series Austins allowed the formation of 'automobile machine gun platoons' (Russian: пулемётный автомобильный взвод – pulemyotniy avtomobilniy vzvod or автопулемётный взвод – avtopulemyotniy vzvod). First platoons (5–12), formed according to the organization no. 19, each had three Austins, four staff cars, a truck, a workshop truck, a tanker truck and four motorcycles, with personnel of four officers and 45–46 soldiers. Further platoons (13–24, 26–28, 30–36), formed according to the organization no. 20, received only two Austins, but had a gun section consisting of a gun-armed Garford-Putilov Armoured Car, a staff car, a truck and a motorcycle. Platoons 5 to 12 received an additional Garford. Crews of those auto-MG platoons were entirely drawn from volunteers. Most of the platoons were used in the Western and South-Western Fronts, some platoons in the Northern Front and Caucasus. In combat they were attached to divisions or regiments.

By mid-1916 it was evident that larger units should be formed to make armoured cars more effective. In August, platoons were arranged into twelve "armoured automobile battalions" (Russian: броневой автомобильный дивизион – bronyevoy avtomobilniy divizion or автобронедивизион – avtobronedivizion), each attached to a specific army. Each battalion was formed from two to five former platoons, which were renamed to sections whilst retaining the old number. In some cases, for example in the Caucasus theatre, the platoon organization was retained.

In the Russian Civil War Austins were used by many participants, including both Red and White armies, Ukrainians etc. The Red Army had the largest number of vehicles, including all the Austin-Putilov and Austin-Kergesse vehicles and most of the 3rd series. In Soviet service the cars were organized into "armoured automobile units" (Russian: броневой автомоильный отряд – bronevoy avtomobilniy otryad or автоброневой отряд – avtobronevoy otryad), similar in strength to a World War I-era platoon: three machine gun-armed cars and one either gun-armed or machine gun-armed, four staff cars, five trucks, a tanker truck, a workshop truck and four motorcycles. The Red Army (RKKA) Austins also saw combat in the Polish-Soviet War. By 1921 the RKKA possessed about 16 Austins of the 1st series, 15 2nd series, 78 3rd series and Putilovs. British-built Austins were removed from service by 1931, and by 1933, the Russian-built ones were also retired.

The Austin-Putilov armoured car named Vrag Kapitala ("Enemy of the Capital"), on display at the Artillery Museum, Saint Petersburg, is often referred to as the vehicle which Lenin stood on to address the crowd in April 1917. However, it cannot be true as this armoured car was not manufactured until 1919.

=== Other users ===
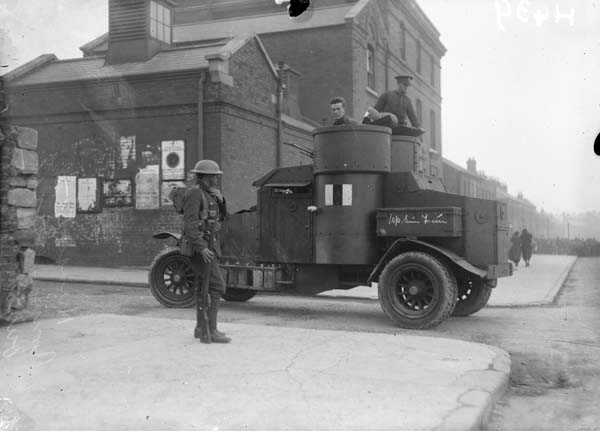
British Austin in Ireland in 1920

British

Sixteen of the Austins built for Russian but not sent following the revolution were used to equip the 17th (Armoured Car) Battalion of the Tank Corps. The Vickers machine guns were exchanged for the Hotchkiss M1914 machine gun, which was the standard machine gun of the British tank unit. The 17th Battalion arrived in France in April 1918. Its first operations were in support of the French Army in June. It returned to the British Army in August and was very successful at the Battle of Amiens. The Austins were towed in pairs by tanks across the mud of no-man's-land. Once they reached better ground on the other side of the lines, they ranged freely. A German Corps headquarters 10 miles back was captured and German reserves, artillery and supply lines were shot up. Having crossed the German frontier at Malmedy, Belgium, on 1 December 1918 after the Armistice, the 17th was the first British unit to enter Cologne on the Rhine on the 8th, escorting the Commanding Officer of 2nd Cavalry Brigade to negotiate Allied control of the city.

After the war, the bodies were reused on Peerless lorry chassis. Some of these were still in service at the start of the Second World War.

Some cars were sent to the Caspian Sea region. Austins were also used by the British in the Irish War of Independence.

== Variants ==
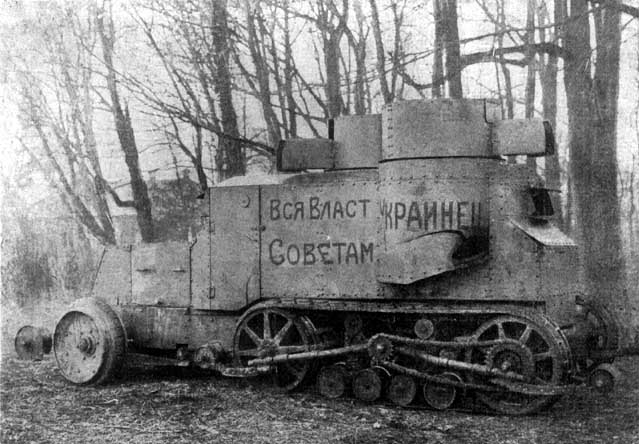
An "Austin-Kegresse" Armoured Car with Kegresse tracks of the Red Army which was damaged during the Polish–Soviet War. In the area of Zhytomyr, 21 March 1920

- Austin 1st series (or model 1914) – based on a passenger car chassis with 30 hp engine and rear axle drive with wooden spoked wheels. 3.5–4 mm armour, eventually replaced with 7 mm plates. Weight with original armour 2.66 ton. Road speed 50–60 km/h. Road range 250 km. Crew of 4 (commander, driver and two gunners). 48 units built.
- Austin 2nd series (or model 1915) – based on 1.5 ton truck chassis with 50 hp engine, shortened hull, thicker armour, redesigned driver's cab roof, no rear door. After arrival to Russia were fitted with a redesigned rear hull section (with second driving post and rear hatch) and MG side shields. Weight 5.3 ton. Road speed about 60 km/h. Road range 200 km. Crew of 4–5. 60 units built.
- Austin 3rd series – Modified rear section and in the driver's cab, rear driver post, MG side shields, bulletproof glass in front vision slots, no big side windows, no rear hatch. Weight 5.3 ton. Road speed about 60 km/h. Road range 200 km. Crew of 4–5. 60 units built.
- Austin model 1918 – Strengthened chassis, double rear wheels. 70 vehicles were ordered, but were not delivered due to events in Russia in 1917.
- Austin-Putilov – Had locally produced hull designed by the Putilovski Works, with diagonally placed MG turrets, right side door and thicker armour. Chassis, the same as in the 3rd series, were still ordered from Austin. Armour 4 to 7.5 mm thick. Weight 5.2 tons. Road speed about 55 km/h. Road range 200 km. Crew of 5. 33 built.
- Austin-Kegresse (or Austin-Putilov-Kegresse) – Austin-Putilov hull mounted on a half-track chassis. Weight 5.8–5.9 tons. Road speed about 25 km/h. Road range 100 km. 12 built.
- Armoured hulls of damaged Austins were sometimes (mostly during the Russian Civil War) mounted on other chassis, usually White, Fiat or Packard. The combination of White chassis and Austin hull is sometimes referred to as White-Austin.

== Operators ==
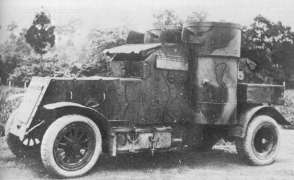
Imperial Japanese Army Austin armoured car model 1918

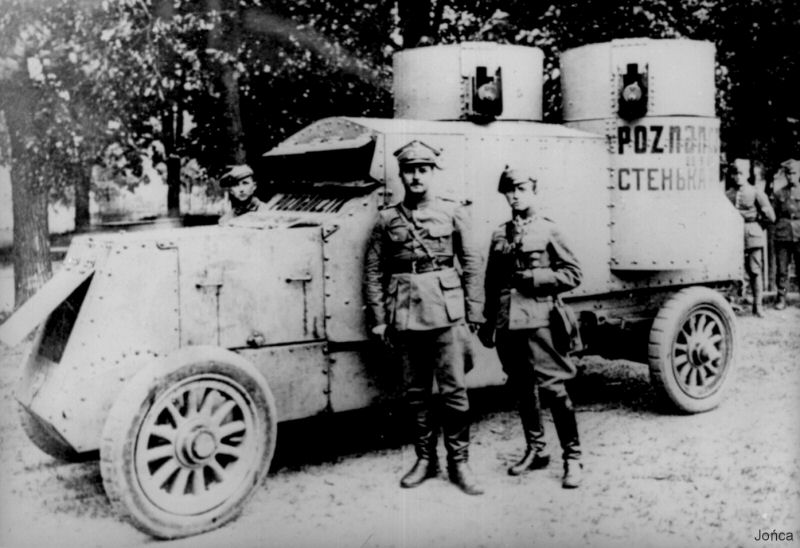
Austin-Putilovets «Poznańczyk» near Bobruysk, Polish–Soviet War 1920

Austria

- The last active Austin was probably the vehicle employed by the Austrian Army until 1935.

Bulgaria

- At least one car was captured at the Dobruja Front at 17 November 1916 by the Bulgarian Armed Forces.

Estonia

- Estonian Army used two captured Austin-Putilovs, named Tasuja and Suur Tõll.

Finland

- Two Austins 3rd series, initially sent by the Soviets in 1918 to help the Finnish Red Guards in the Finnish Civil War, were taken over by the Finnish Army, which used them until the mid-1920s.

Democratic Republic of Georgia

- Armed forces of Democratic Republic of Georgia operated several Austins in 1918–1921 period, those armoured cars were leftovers from Imperial Russian Army.

German Empire

- Few captured vehicles were used during World War I on both fronts. Four vehicles, two 2nd Series and two 3rd Series, were used in 1918–1919 by the Freikorps armoured unit Kokampf (Kommando der Kampfwagenabteilungen) formed in Berlin as Kampfwagen Abteilung Körting to suppress the German Revolution of 1918–1919 in Berlin, Munich and Leipzig.

Japan

- Six Austin model 1918s were imported by the Japanese Army, where they remained in service until the early 1930s.

Latvia

- Latvian Army used one Austin 2nd series, named Zemgaleetis (Zemgalietis in modern spelling), captured from the Soviets during the Latvian War of Independence.

Mongolia

- Two or three cars were given by the Soviets to the Mongolian People's Army in the early 1920s.

Poland

- Polish Armed Forces captured up to 20 Austins from the Soviets during the Civil War and Polish-Soviet War. Some were subsequently employed by the Polish. Five remained in service after the war, some until the 1930s.

Romania

- At least one Austin and four Austin-Putilovs were used by the Romanian Army.

Russian Empire

- The Imperial Russian Army was the main user of Austin armored cars and after the end of the First World War the vehicles went to the Bolsheviks, White Russians, Georgia and Ukraine, among others.

Russian SFSR

- Vehicles taken over by the Workers' and Peasants' Red Army initially went into action in the Russian Civil War, and were later used to suppress independent republics established in the former Russian Empire.

Ukrainian People's Republic

- Ukrainian People's Army operated unknown number of Austins in 1918–1921 period, those armoured cars were leftovers from Imperial Russian Army.

United Kingdom of Great Britain and Ireland

- British Army
