= Panagiotis Danglis =

Greek politician and general (1853–1924)

- Παναγιώτης Δαγκλής
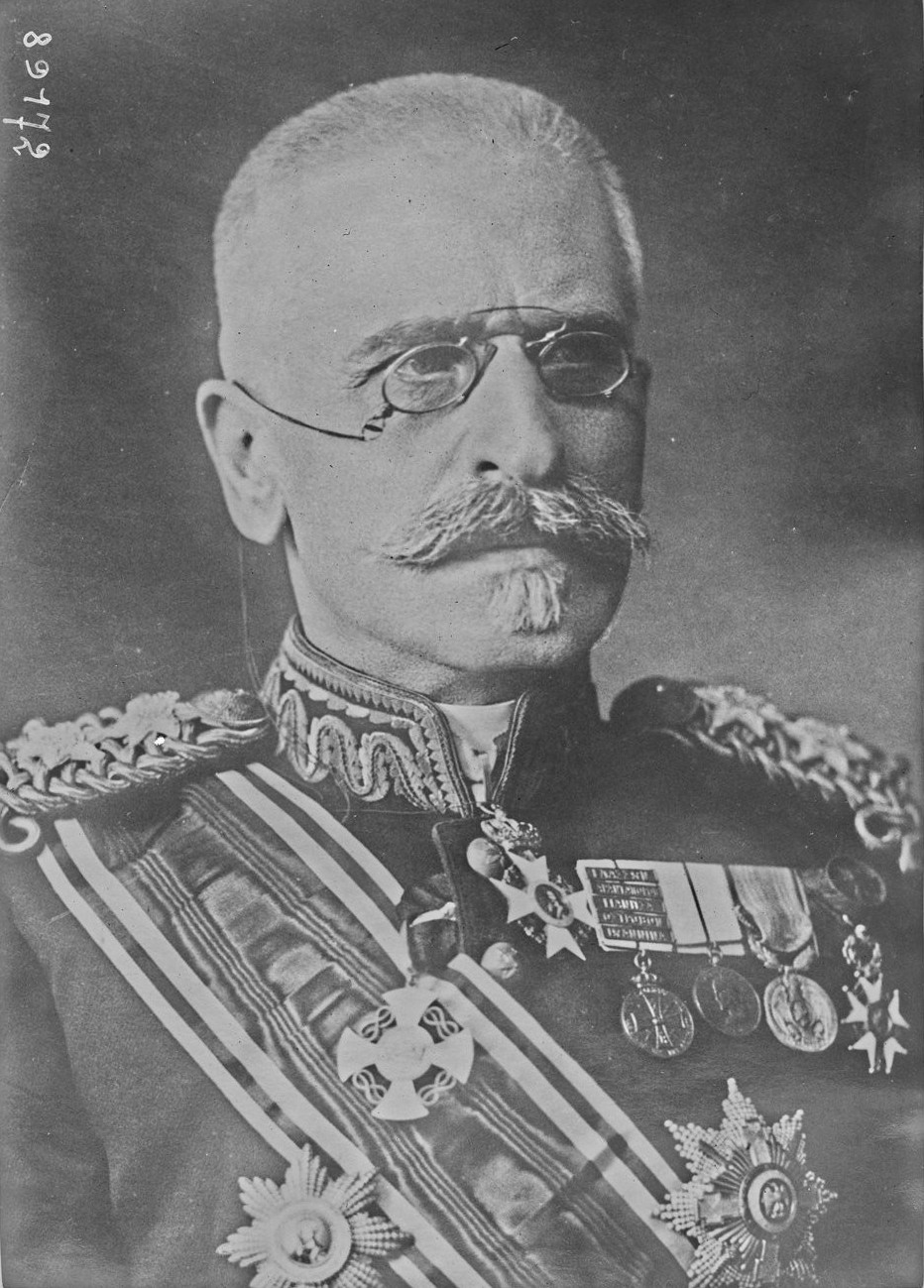
- Panagiotis Danglis c. 1910s

Minister of Military Affairs
- In office 10 August – 24 September 1915
- Monarch: Constantine I
- Prime Minister: Eleftherios Venizelos

Personal details
- Born: 17 November 1853 Atalanti, Kingdom of Greece
- Died: 9 March 1924 (aged 70) Athens, Kingdom of Greece
- Resting place: First Cemetery of Athens
- Party: Liberal Party
- Spouse: Sofia Mostra
- Relations: Giotis Danglis (grandfather); Georgios Danglis (father); Georgios Mylonas (grandson)
- Education: Varvakeion
- Alma mater: Hellenic Army Academy
- Awards: Grand Commander of the Order of the Redeemer; Legion of Honour

Military service
- Allegiance: Kingdom of Greece; Provisional Government of National Defence
- Branch/service: Hellenic Army
- Years of service: 1870–1920
- Rank: Lieutenant general
- Unit: Army of Epirus; Army of Thessaly
- Commands: Commander-in-Chief of the Hellenic Army
- Battles/wars: Greco-Turkish War (1897); Battle of Gribovo; Macedonian Struggle; Balkan Wars; First Balkan War; Second Balkan War; World War I; Macedonian front; Vardar Offensive

Panagiotis Danglis (Greek: Παναγιώτης Δαγκλής; 29 November [O.S. 17 November] 1853 – 9 March 1924) was a Greek military officer and politician. He is particularly notable for inventing the Schneider-Danglis mountain gun, his service as chief of staff in the Balkan Wars, and participation in the Triumvirate of the Provisional Government of National Defence during the First World War.

== Life ==
=== Origin and early life ===
Panagiotis Danglis was born in Atalanti on 17 November 1853, where his father was serving in an infantry battalion. His family was of Souliot origin, speaking the Soulotic dialect of Albanian at home, and had a long and distinguished history: Panagiotis was named after his grandfather, Giotis Danglis, a Souliot chieftain who had begun serving under Napoleon during the second French occupation of the Ionian Islands, and had become a general during the Greek War of Independence. His son, Georgios Danglis (1809–1896), was born in exile in Corfu, entered the Hellenic Army in 1828 in time to fight in the last campaigns of the War of Independence, and after a long career rose to the rank of major general. Panagiotis Danglis was the fourth child of his parents, but only the oldest, his sister Christina, born in 1843, had survived infancy. His two older brothers died early, as did many of his younger siblings, apart from another sister, Polyxeni, born in 1858.

During his first years, he followed his father around the various garrison towns in Central Greece. In 1857–1860 the family stayed at Stylida, where Danglis first went into school. In 1860–1862 the family moved to the capital, Athens, where Danglis attended a private school. After participating in the suppression of the failed Nafplion revolt against King Otto in early 1862, Danglis' father was promoted to major and the family moved to Agrinio. From this small provincial town Danglis experienced the tumultuous events of Otto's ouster, the arrival of King George I in 1863, the union of the Ionian islands with Greece, and the outbreak of the Cretan Revolution of 1866–1869. In September 1867 he returned to Athens to attend the first class of high school in the prestigious Varvakeion high school, staying with his maternal grandmother, and his unmarried aunt. Danglis completed the second and third classes of high school at Missolonghi, spending the summers with his family at Agrinio. Although successfully promoted to the fourth class, in July 1870 he decided to enter the Hellenic Military Academy. With the agreement of his father, he returned to Athens on 23 August. After passing the entrance examinations in early September, he enrolled as a cadet on 6 November. During that summer, Danglis also composed a novel, titled "Penelope", which was published in Athens in 1871.

=== Early military career ===
==== Training at the academy ====
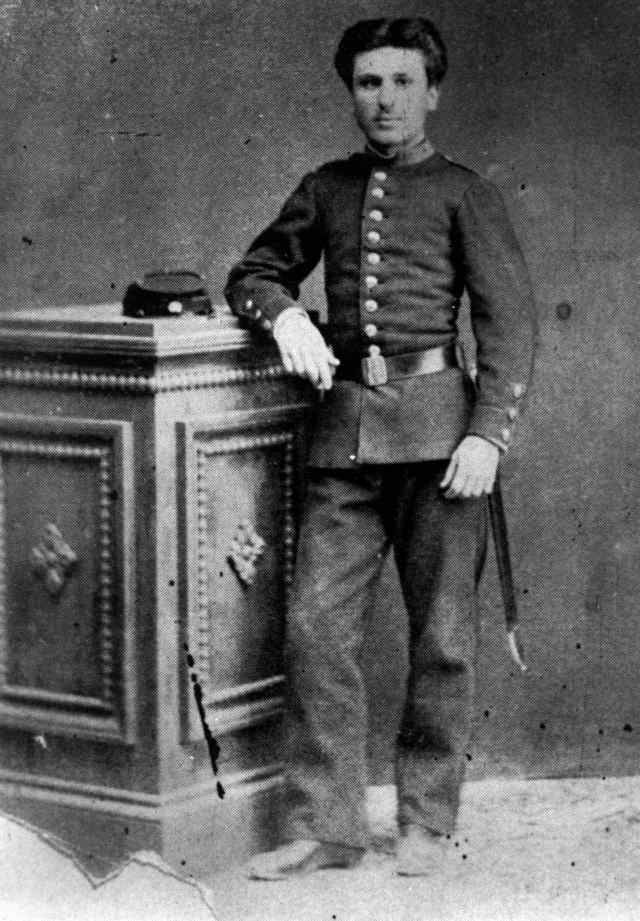
Danglis as a first-year cadet, 1870.

Danglis enrolled in the Army Academy at a crucial juncture: the institution had been badly neglected in the previous years, and only 13 students were attending it when Danglis entered it. His class of 31 cadets, and the reform of its curriculum by the then minister for military affairs, Lt. Colonel Charalambos Zymvrakakis, breathed new life into it. Danglis was a distinguished student. He graduated to the second and third years in third place (only 17 of his class graduated to the second year), and received his first promotion, to corporal, in 1872. He then scored first in his class during all subsequent the exams, except for scoring second during the general theoretical exams between the fifth and sixth classes. Promoted to sergeant major in 1874, he and his classmates of the senior year began enjoying the social life of Athens. Danglis graduated from the academy in August 1877 top of his class, and was commissioned as ensign of artillery, like most of his colleagues. The artillery, recently enlarged due to a possible Greek participation in the ongoing Russo-Turkish War of 1877–78, was facing extreme shortages in qualified officers at the time.

==== The undeclared war of 1878 and its aftermath ====
Danglis began his service at the 1st Artillery Regiment in Athens, amidst a heady atmosphere of war preparations. On 26 October he was posted to the 6th Mountain Battery, recently equipped with new Krupp guns. The battery moved from Athens to Lamia, close to the then border with the Ottoman Empire, in November. Popular enthusiasm ran high, especially after the Russian army overcame the stubborn Ottoman resistance at the Siege of Plevna—much admired by Danglis in his notes—and advanced towards Constantinople. Revolutionary movements broke out in Crete and Epirus, while the Greek government under Alexandros Koumoundouros finally edged towards entry into the war to safeguard Greek territorial claims and interests.

Danglis served in the army of Eastern Greece, under the command of Major General Skarlatos Soutsos, a nominal force of 6,800 men—Danglis estimated the effectives at 5,500–6,000 at the most. The army set out from Lamia on 21 January, and crossed the border on the next day, despite the onset of extreme cold and heavy rainfall. The local Ottoman garrisons withdrew to Domokos, but the Greek expedition was a fiasco: the bad weather, including snow, and the bad organization led to a dispersal of forces. Finally, on 25 January the Greek force encircled Domokos, and Soutsos began negotiations with the Ottoman commander for its surrender. On the next day, however, the Greek government ordered its troops to return home, as the Russians and Ottomans had signed an armistice on 19 January, and the Great Powers had put pressure on Athens to endure peace. By 28 January, Danglis was back with his unit in Lamia. On 7 February 1878, Danglis was promoted to second lieutenant in a slew of promotions across the army. From Lamia he observed the failure of the uprisings in Thessaly and Epirus and Crete, while Greek interests were championed on the diplomatic front by Great Britain as a counter to Russian designs. The political situation remained tense: the Congress of Berlin had decided to award Thessaly up to the Pineios River and Epirus up to the Thyamis River to Greece, but the Ottoman government dragged its feet. Greco-Ottoman negotiations at Preveza in early 1879, and in Constantinople in September–December 1879, broke down.

On 13 April 1878, following actions by his father, Danglis was transferred to the 3rd Mountain Battery at his family's home town of Agrinio. The artillery was moved to Lefkada in October 1878, and to a newly constructed but ephemeral encampment at Lepenous—not coincidentally, the electoral district of the then minister of military affairs, Dimitrios Grivas—in May–July 1879. From there Danglis moved with his battery to Athens in August, before being posted to the Arsenal in Nafplion in October, where he assumed command of the artificers' company. On 21 December, he published in the daily Athens newspaper Efimeris an anonymous article—signed only as "Omega" and identifying himself only as a professional officer—requesting the removal of the army from the influence of politicians.

Map of the territorial expansion of Greece, with Thessaly and the Arta area marked in light blue

The ongoing dispute over Epirus and Thessaly meant that the army had been maintained far larger than its peacetime establishment since 1878, to the detriment of the already feeble Greek budget. Thus the 1880 government of Charilaos Trikoupis decided to cut down on military expenses, demobilizing soldiers and reducing the size of the army. This decision proved short-lived, as the Great Powers convened at Berlin in June 1880 and reconfirmed the decisions of 1878, forcing the government to once again engage in preparations for a possible conflict with Turkey; hasty purchases of equipment began in Europe, and in July, a full mobilization aimed at producing a 60,000-strong field army began. Danglis returned to the 1st Artillery Regiment at Athens in October, assigned to the 1st Field Battery. As a result of the increase in the size of the army—already comprising over 45,000 men in late October, and with an establishment strength revised upwards to 82,000 men in December—on 6 December numerous officers were promoted; Danglis was promoted to Lieutenant.

In March 1881, the Greek army once again started assembling near the border. On 1 April, Danglis left Piraeus for Agrinio by ship, while his battery moved over land. Due to malaria at Agrinio, his unit moved to Missolonghi, where he assumed command of the 1st Battery. In the meantime, the Great Powers and the Ottoman government had reached an agreement that reduced the amount of territory to be ceded to Greece: in Epirus, only the area around Arta would be ceded. Following pressure by the Powers, the Greek government conceded in the Convention of Constantinople on 2 July. Arta was occupied on 24 June, but Danglis did not arrive until 20 July, taking over command of the 2nd Mountain Battery. Over the next few months, Danglis was transferred with his unit from Arta to Lefkada, Missolonghi, and Agrinio. In late December 1881, Danglis was appointed commander of the 4th Mountain Battery, as well as a squadron comprising the 3rd and 4th Field Batteries, at Arta. His life and career for the next two years is unknown, as little material survives in his archives, apart from reports on tests of Krupp-type artillery packs for mules in April and August 1883.

==== Belgium, the Vosseur mission and the Rumelian crisis ====
Danglis was promoted to captain in 1883. Late in that year, he went to Belgium for further studies, the cost of 1,000 francs paid for by his father, who did not hesitate to take loans to that end. In January 1884, he was attached to an artillery regiment at Liège, where he remained until his return to Greece in August. From his letters to his father, Danglis was less than satisfied with his experiences in Belgium, noting critically that "they are not far ahead of us, one sees a lot of 'Greek things' [ῥωμέϊκα] here as well".

On his return was appointed adjutant to Brigadier Victor Vosseur, the head of the 1884–87 French military mission, which had been tasked by Trikoupis with modernizing the Greek Army. The results of the mission, as laid out by Danglis himself in a report requested by the Ministry of Military Affairs in 1898, were meagre, mostly because the mission's recommendations were ignored or modified by the Greek governments, particularly the 1885–1886 government of Theodoros Deligiannis, which was viscerally opposed to any policies espoused by Trikoupis. Nevertheless, the Deligiannis government was involved in a major diplomatic and military crisis with the Ottoman Empire, resulting from the de facto annexation of Eastern Rumelia to the Principality of Bulgaria in September 1885. Deligiannis demanded comparable territorial compensation for Greece from the Ottomans and threatened war, mobilizing the army. As Vosseur's adjutant, Danglis was in a privileged position to observe events. The new army organization, drafted by Vosseur, was voted by Parliament in December, and by April 1886 the army, including the Gendarmerie, had reached a strength of some 75,000 men. As Danglis points out, however, due to lack of training, equipment, and trained officers, only about 50,000 were capable of fighting. Under the pen name "Shell" (Ὀβίς), Danglis published two articles outlining his opinion on the best deployment of the army in the Akropolis newspaper on 5 and 11 January.

The Greek government had driven itself into a corner: despite its belligerent rhetoric, it was loath to carry through with its threat of war, and came under intense pressure by the Great Powers to back down, including the blockade of Phaleron by the fleets of the Powers on 26 April. Deligiannis resigned, and after a brief caretaker government under Dimitrios Valvis, Trikoupis returned to power on 8 May. On the next day, as Trikoupis was forming his government, clashes broke out between the Greek and Turkish troops along the line of the border in Thessaly. The clashes lasted until a ceasefire on 11 May, and although generally the Greeks held their own and scored some successes, Danglis considered it fortunate that the ceasefire took place when it did, as Greece had about 40,000 men deployed facing three times as many Ottoman troops; without any readily available reserves, and exhausted after three days of fighting, the Greek front was brittle, and any Turkish breakthrough would face no opposition to advancing to Larissa. Furthermore, in two places Greek troops had performed poorly: at Koutra, 300 men of the 5th Evzone Battalion had surrendered to the Turks, while at Patsos an entire infantry company fled after an attack by a much smaller Turkish detachment. The two captains responsible for the Koutra incident were court-martialled and condemned to death in August 1887, although the death sentence was immediately commuted by the King. On 8 August 1887, Danglis, again under the pen name "Shell", published an article in Akropolis fiercely critical of the two men.

==== Peacetime service and private life ====
In the meantime, in January 1886, through the mediation of a retired colonel, Danglis met and became engaged to Sofia Mostra, the 16-year-old daughter of the naval architect—and fellow Army Academy graduate and Epirote—Spyridon Mostras (1827–1899) and Eleni Mela. Their wedding took place on 20 April 1886. The newlywed couple initially lodged in the Mostras family residence at Voukourestiou Street 9. On the occasion of the Bastille Day celebrations in 1886, Danglis received the medal of a knight of the Legion of Honour from the French government. In July and August 1886, Danglis and his wife visited Constantinople and its environs, with Danglis keeping detailed daily notes on the trip in a small notebook. As a member of the Athens garrison, Danglis took part in the festivities to celebrate the coming of age of the crown prince, the future Constantine I, in December. On the occasion, on 1 December he received the Silver Cross of the Order of the Redeemer.

In the early hours of 6 August 1887, Danglis' first daughter was born. In December 1887, with the departure of the French military mission, Danglis returned to the 1st Artillery Regiment, taking over command of the 3rd Field Battery on 10 December. In February 1888, a translation by Danglis of a treatise (La mission militaire suisse sur le théâtre de la guerre serbo-bulgare) by the Swiss colonel Hugo Hungerbühler on the 1885 Serbo-Bulgarian War, was printed in 1,000 copies.

He was promoted to major in 1892, and in the next year invented the Schneider-Danglis mountain gun. During the Greco-Turkish War of 1897 he served as chief of staff of I Brigade in the Army of Epirus, and fought at the Battle of Gribovo.

==== In the general staff ====
A lieutenant colonel since 1902, he was transferred to the newly founded General Staff Corps in 1904. Promoted to colonel in 1907, he participated in the last stages of the Macedonian Struggle in 1908, supervising operations for the "Macedonian Committee" in the Salonica area under the nom de guerre of Parmenion. Following the 1909 Goudi coup, the General Staff Corps was disbanded and Danglis returned to the artillery, serving as commander of the Army Academy (1910), the 1st Infantry Division, the Greek Gendarmerie, and the 2nd Infantry Division (1911).

In 1911, Danglis was promoted to major general, and became head of the Army General Staff in August 1912, and on the outbreak of the First Balkan War two months later he became chief of staff to Crown Prince Constantine's Army of Thessaly until November 1912, when he became a member of the Greek delegation in the London Peace Conference.

=== Commander in Epirus ===
Following the assassination of King George in Thessaloniki, Constantine, now king, had to leave Ioannina. Departing, he named Danglis as commander of the army in Epirus, comprising the 2nd, 3rd, 8th, and 13th divisions. Operations had largely concluded so that his main task was completing the occupation of Northern Epirus, pacifying the local population, and strengthening Greek claims in the region, which were being challenged by Italy. Danglis, however, saw this move as the result of machinations by his rivals in the General Staff—Dousmanis foremost—to remove him from the military high command. Constantine continued to show favour to his former chief of staff, naming him to the honorary position of adjutant-general to the king (with Dousmanis as adjutant) on 8 March, and awarding him the cross of the Grand Commander of the Order of the Redeemer on 21 May, but Danglis' requests to return to Athens and resume his proper post were left unanswered; although his appointment was originally termed "temporary", he would continue to command the army in Epirus, later constituted briefly as the III Army Corps and eventually as the V Army Corps, for over two years.

After the end of the Second Balkan War, on 9–18 August 1913 Danglis went to Thessaloniki, where he chaired the council of division commanders (then the highest-ranking officers in the army) to decide on the promotions of the career and reserve officers. On 19 August he left by train for Aix-les-Bains, where his family was already on holiday, arriving there on the 25th. On the previous day, however, King Constantine had caused a major diplomatic incident during a speech in Germany: after receiving the rank and baton of a German Generalfeldmarschall by the Kaiser, Constantine had ascribed the Greek successes in the Balkan Wars to the training he and his aides had received in Germany. News of this speech caused uproar in France, leading to a diplomatic crisis with Greece. As a result, on 29 August Danglis—promoted to lieutenant general at about that time—was ordered to interrupt his vacation and participate, as the official representative of Greece, in the French great field manoeuvres of the year, that had already begun. His participation there, his reputation as a "true friend of France", as well as a judicious and carefully worded interview in the Le Temps that paid tribute to the contributions of the French military mission, quickly calmed the situation and helped restore the Franco-Greek relationship. He then returned to Aix, only to be recalled to Greece by Venizelos on 13 September.

=== Politics, World War I and the National Schism ===
In late 1914, he left the army and went into politics, joining the Liberal Party of Eleftherios Venizelos in 1915 and elected as an MP for Epirus representing Ioannina. He served as Minister for Military Affairs in Venizelos' short-lived cabinet (10 August – 24 September) in 1915, and supported Venizelos during his struggle against King Constantine in 1915–16. In August 1916, along with Venizelos and admiral Pavlos Kountouriotis, he formed the leading triumvirate of the "Provisional Government of National Defence", a separate government in Thessaloniki. In 1917, Greece formally joined the Entente Powers in the First World War. Danglis was appointed nominal commander-in-chief of the Greek Army, a position he retained until near the war's end when he returned to his parliamentary office. He was formally discharged from the Army on 7 October 1920. In 1921, Danglis succeeded the self-exiled Venizelos as president of the Liberal Party.

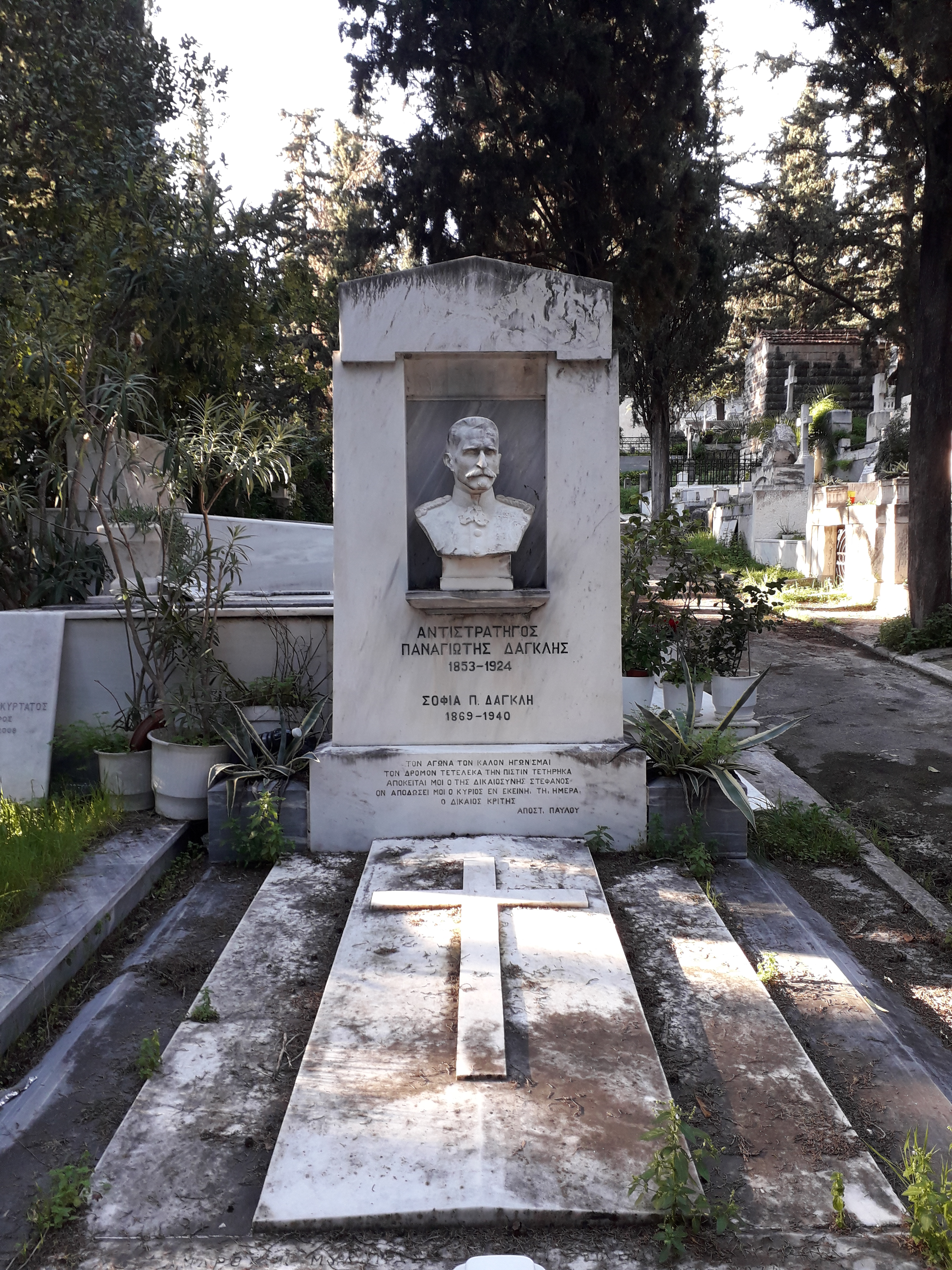
The grave of Panagiotis Danglis at the First Cemetery of Athens

He died in Athens on 9 March 1924.

== Sources ==
- Lefkoparidis, Xenofon, ed. (1965a). Στρατηγοῦ Π. Γ. Δαγκλῆ: Ἀναμνήσεις-Ἒγγραφα-Ἀλληλογραφία. Το Ἀρχείον του [General P. G. Danglis: Memoirs-Documents-Correspondence. His Archive] (in Greek). Vol. A. Athens: Βιβλιοπωλείον Ε. Γ. Βαγιονάκη.
- Lefkoparidis, Xenofon, ed. (1965b). Στρατηγοῦ Π. Γ. Δαγκλῆ: Ἀναμνήσεις-Ἒγγραφα-Ἀλληλογραφία. Το Ἀρχείον του [General P. G. Danglis: Memoirs-Documents-Correspondence. His Archive] (in Greek). Vol. B. Athens: Βιβλιοπωλείον Ε. Γ. Βαγιονάκη.
- Συνοπτική Ιστορία του Γενικού Επιτελείου Στρατού 1901–2001 [A Concise History of the Hellenic Army General Staff 1901–2001] (in Greek). Athens: Hellenic Army History Directorate. 2001. ISBN 960-7897-44-7.

Political offices
Preceded by Dimitrios Gounaris	Minister for Military Affairs; 10 August – 24 September 1915	Succeeded by Ioannis Giannakitsas
Military offices
Vacant Abolition of the General Staff in 1909 Title last held by Konstantinos Sapountzakis	Chief of the Army Staff Service; August 1912 – March 1913	Succeeded by Viktor Dousmanis
New title	Commander-in-chief of the Greek Army; May – October 1918	Succeeded by Lt. General Leonidas Paraskevopoulos
