= 75 mm Schneider-Danglis 06/09 =

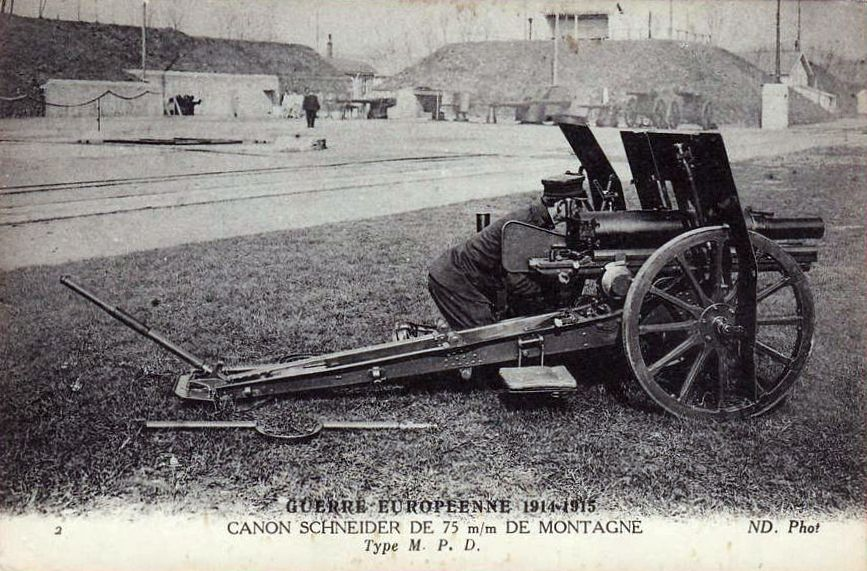
- Place of origin: Kingdom of Greece

Service history
- Used by: France, Bulgaria, Russia, Greece, Finland
- Wars: First Balkan War; Second Balkan War; World War I Greco-Turkish War (1919–1922); World War II; Winter War; Greco-Italian War

Production history
- Designer: Panagiotis Danglis
- Designed: 1893
- Manufacturer: Schneider-Creusot, Putilov Works
- Produced: 1908

Specifications
- Mass: 616-627 kg (sources differ)
- Barrel length: 1.25 m
- Shell: 75mm L/16.7
- Shell weight: 6.5 kg
- Caliber: 75mm
- Barrels: 1
- Breech: swinging block
- Recoil: hydro-pneumatic
- Carriage: hinged box trail
- Elevation: –6° to +28°
- Traverse: +/- 3°
- Muzzle velocity: 371 m/s
- Effective firing range: 7 km

The 75 mm Schneider-Danglis 06/09 (Greek: Ορειβατικό πυροβόλο των 75χιλ. Schneider-Δαγκλής, υποδ. 1908) (French: Matériel de montagne à tir rapide de 75mm, type MPD) was a 75mm mountain gun used by multiple countries prior to, during and after World War I.

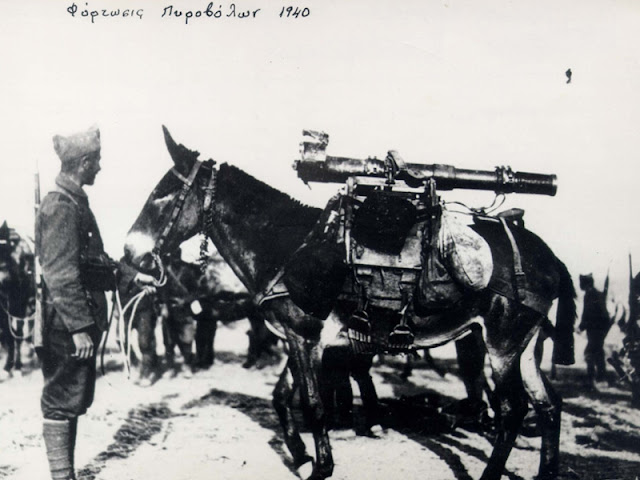
Schneider-Danglis in action, during the Greco-Italian war disassembled and loaded on mules.

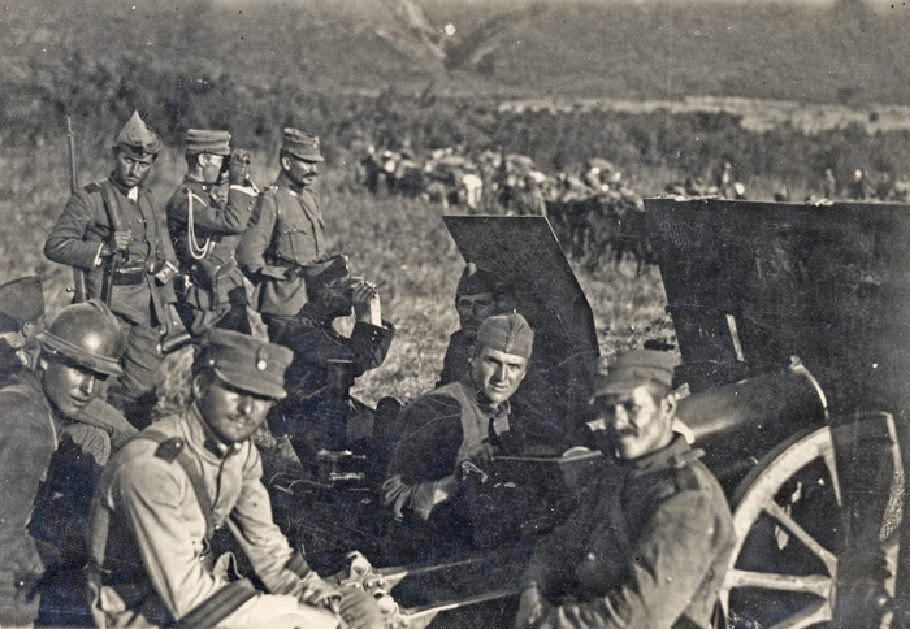
Schneider-Danglis in asia minor during Greco-Turkish War (1919–1922)

The gun was designed by a Greek artillery officer, Major Panagiotis Danglis, in 1893. It featured an inner barrel which could be removed from a combination outer barrel & breech mechanism, making for easier transportation. The carriage had rotating cranked axle stubs, allowing for high or low elevation. Underneath the gun was a cradle with a hydro-pneumatic recoil system, as well as an S-shaped shield and hinged box trail, the latter of which allowed the gun to be drawn by horses from fitted shafts. It was used by Greece during the Greco-Turkish War (1919–1922), Balkan Wars, World War I, and World War II. The Russian Empire purchased several guns from Schneider-Creusot in France, but also manufactured 400 licensed guns at the Putilov Works. Bulgaria captured 5 guns during World War I. Finland purchased an unknown quantity which were used during the Winter War.

== Further developments ==
The 75 mm Schneider-Danglis 06/09 led to development of the 75 M.P., 75 M.P.C., 75 M.P.C.7 (75mm M1912) 75 M.P.D (75mm M1910) 75 M.P.D. 5 (75mm M1908), & 75 M.P.E. France sent two of the ten batteries of 75 M.P.D.s ordered by Greece in 1913, and six batteries that had been ordered by Peru. These were to have initially been sent to Montenegro but were diverted to Serbia after Montenegro surrendered to Austria-Hungary on 25 January 1916.

== See also ==
75 mm Krupp-Lykoudis
