= Panagiotis Danglis (chieftain) =

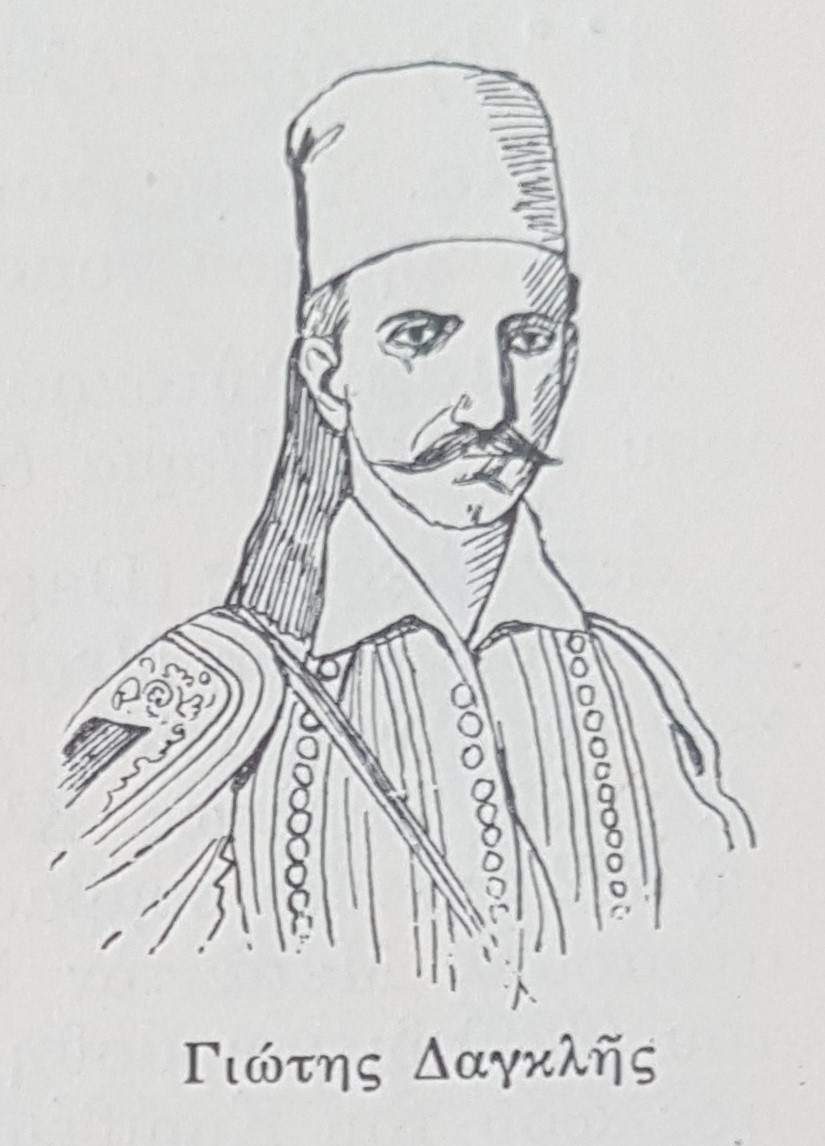

Panagiotis Danglis was a leader of the Greek revolutionary army during the Greek War of Independence (1821–1830). He was born in Souli and was the son of Gogas Danglis. During the period of the Revolution, he was chieftain of Souli (1820–1822). He died in 1829 in Nafpaktos.
