= 23 Field Regiment (India) =

Indian Army artillery unit

- Active: 1919-1946; 1953-present
- Country: India
- Allegiance: India
- Branch: Indian Army
- Type: Artillery
- Size: Regiment
- Nickname: The Devil Regiment
- Mottos: Sarvatra, Izzat-O-Iqbal (Everywhere with Honour and Glory).
- Colors: Red & Navy Blue
- Anniversaries: 15 January – Raising Day
- Battle honours: Ad Teclesan, OP Hill

Insignia
- Abbreviation: 23 Fd Regt

23 Field Regiment (Ad Teclesan and OP Hill) is part of the Regiment of Artillery of the Indian Army.

== Formation and early history ==
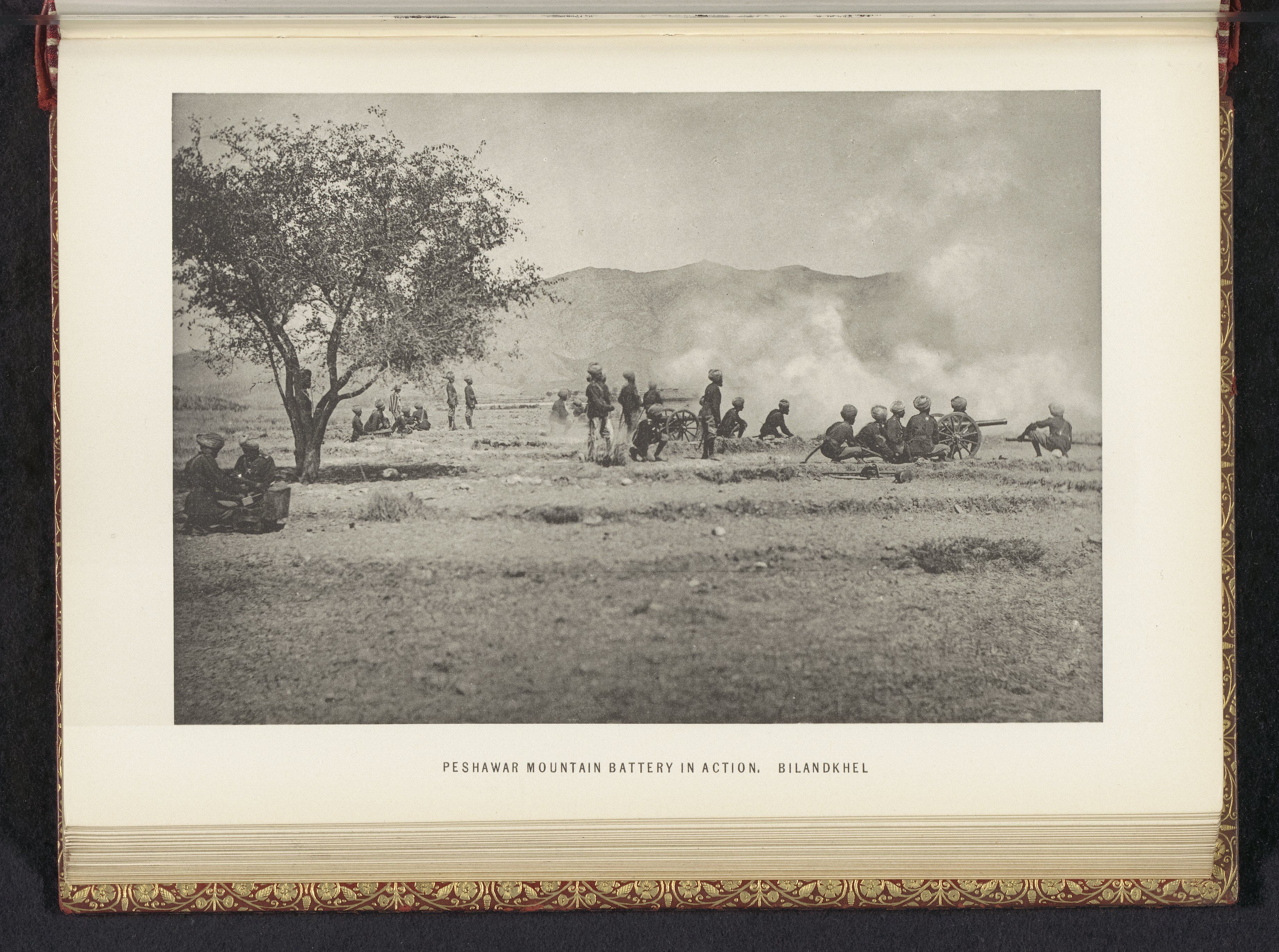
Peshawar mountain battery in action in Biland Khel, North-West Frontier Province

The British developed mountain artillery in India in the 1800s to allow field guns to accompany its forces operating in the conflicts taking place in the frontier mountainous regions of North West India, neighbouring Afghanistan. These mountain artillery units were organised as mountain batteries, with each battery consisting of four to six mountain guns. These batteries took part in the many campaigns in Afghanistan, the Third Anglo-Burmese War and then in the First World War, during which more batteries were raised. These batteries proved their mettle at various fronts during the great war.

During the war, the practice of grouping together batteries as brigades began, though most batteries still fought singly, often quite far away from other parts of the brigade. Most such brigades were formed in the Middle East and East Africa, where these batteries were deployed. In North West India, 3rd Indian Mountain Artillery Brigade was formed in the Kohat Kurram Force in June, 1919 by grouping 3rd (Peshawar) and 8th (Lahore) mountain batteries. The first commanding officer was Lieutenant Colonel T M Luke DSO. The brigade continued to be in the Kohat area till 1924.

In 1920, the nomenclature mountain was changed to pack and these units were named as pack brigades. The numbering of the brigade was also changed and thus in 1920, the name was changed to 9th Pack Artillery Brigade, when it was at Parachinar. Each pack brigade consisted of headquarters, one British pack battery armed with four 3.7 inch howitzers and three Indian pack batteries consisting of four 2.75 inch guns. Occasionally, Indian pack batteries too were equipped with Howitzers.

A re-designation of units took place following Indian Army Order 1279 of 1921 – Pack Artillery Brigades were redesignated at Indian Pack Artillery Brigades and the 6th to 11th brigades were renumbered from 20th to 25th. Thus, 9th Pack Artillery Brigade became 23rd Pack Artillery Brigade. In 1922, the unit was commanded by Lieutenant Colonel James Hayes-Sadler and consisted of the following batteries -

Battery	Class composition	Location
No. 17 British Pack Battery, R.G.A.	½ Punjabi Muslims, ½ Rajputana Rajputs	Rawalpindi
103rd (Peshawar) Mountain Battery (Frontier Force)	½ Punjabi Muslims, ½ Sikhs	Kohat
108th (Lahore) Pack Battery	½ Punjabi Muslims, ½ Sikhs	Kohat
116th (Zhob) Pack Battery	½ Punjabi Muslims, ½ Rajputana Rajputs	Quetta

In 1924, the unit was part of Razmak Field Force and the batteries included Headquarters, 103rd (Peshawar) Pack Battery, 108th (Lahore) Pack Battery, 121st Indian Pack Battery and 11th Pack Artillery Battery, R.G.A. In 1926, the regiment was located at Razmak and was being commanded by Lieutenant Colonel P H H Preston. It consisted of No. 17 British Pack Battery, 103rd (Peshawar) Pack Battery (Frontier Force), 108th (Lahore) Pack Battery and 116th (Zhob) Pack Battery. In 1935, the regiment was in the Ambala – Dehra Dun area. The class composition at that time was Punjabi Muslims and Jat Sikhs. The regiment was then involved in operations in Waziristan.

By Indian Army Order 204 of 1938, the nomenclature ‘Brigade’ was replaced by ‘Regiment’ and thus the title of the unit became 23rd Mountain Regiment. From 1 August 1939, Indian Mountain Artillery ceased to belong to the Royal Regiment of Artillery and formed part of His Majesty's Indian Forces. The Corps of Mountain Artillery was transferred to the Indian Regiment of Artillery, later renamed the Regiment of Indian Artillery (R.I.A.).

== World War II ==
At the outbreak of war, the regiment was located at Abbottabad and commanded by Lieutenant Colonel L R Stansfeld. It consisted of 3rd (Peshawar) F.F., 8th (Lahore), 17th (Nowshera) and 12th (Poonch) mountain batteries and remained in Abbottabad till 1941. It moved to Kakul in the autumn of the same year. It was from Kakul that the regiment proceeded to the Burma theatre.

The regiment consisting of R.H.Q., 3rd (Peshawar) F.F., 8th (Lahore), 17th (Nowshera) and 2nd Jammu and Kashmir batteries joined 14th Indian Infantry Division, headquartered at Comilla, Chittagong in March 1942. The division had under it 4th Indian Infantry Brigade and 47th Indian Infantry Brigade. The regiment was equipped with sixteen 3.7 inch howitzers and commanded by Lieutenant Colonel B C Barford. Soon after, 2nd Jammu and Kashmir battery joined 4th Indian Infantry Brigade to move under 4 Corps at Imphal. The regiment along with 130 Field Regiment, R.A. formed the initial divisional artillery. Anticipating a Japanese landing on Chittagong, the regiment and other elements of the 47th Brigade were deployed between Feni and Feni River. The division was joined by the 123rd Indian Infantry Brigade in June 1942 and the regiment fell back to its original position focussing on training and exercises to familiarise themselves with the new terrain and jungle warfare. The division began moving to the Arakan coast in October 1942. The regiment, less 3rd battery supporting 123 Brigade moved to Buthidaung. In January 1943, two attempts were made by 123 Brigade to capture Rathedaung with support of 3rd and 17th batteries, without success. 8th battery was involved in multiple attempts to capture Donbaik between January and March 1943. Though unsuccessful, the battery received a lot of praise for its prompt response to aid and accurate shooting.

3rd battery headquarters with its Punjabi Muslim section was moved from Htizwe on the newly laid track to the Kaladan River. The battery in support of 8/10 Baluch was attacked in force by the Japanese and their defended localities were overcome. The battery had to take the difficult decision to destroy their guns and shoot their mules to prevent them falling in enemy hands. The battery had to trek for four days through extremely difficult terrain to reach back to Htizwe.

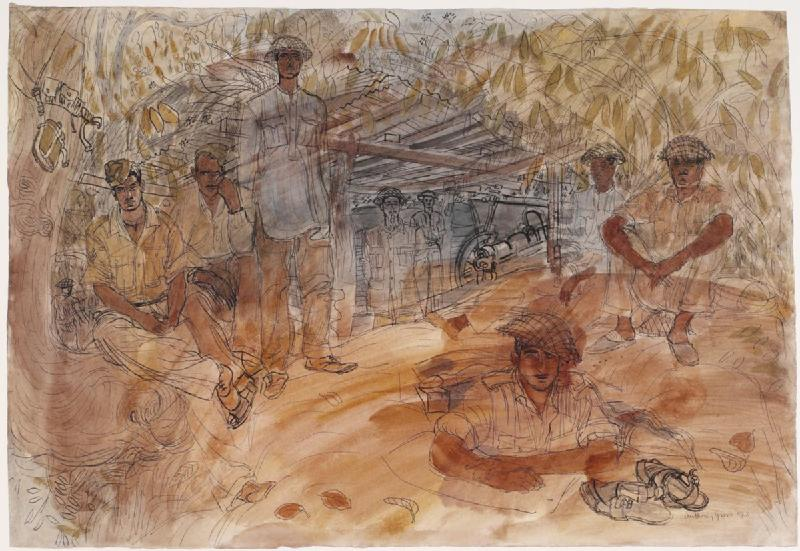
Battle of Arakan, 1943. 31st (Jammu) Mountain Battery in position in the Langchaung area (from the collections of the Imperial War Museums)

On 4 March 1943, following a Japanese attack at Thaungdara, Lieutenant M Burrows, who was the F. O. O. gallantly launched a counterattack after the infantry officer of 10th Lancashire Fusiliers became a casualty. He was awarded the Military Cross for this action. On 11 March, the Sikh section of the 3rd battery were in support of 2/1 Punjab and fought with the Japanese in the open, a fight which ended with the Punjabis charging with their bayonets. On 11 and 12 March, the regiment and other forces withdrew from Htizwe. After the withdrawal from Htizwe, 14 Indian Division was relieved by 26 Infantry Division. But owing to shortage of artillery, 23 Mountain Regiment continued in the location, but serving under a new division. The Japanese continued their relentless attacks for three weeks and 8th and 31st batteries fought in support of 55th Indian Infantry Brigade at Kin Chaung, covering Buthidaung. (2nd Jammu and Kashmir battery had meanwhile been renamed as 31st (Jammu) Mountain Battery.)

R.H.Q, 3rd and 17th batteries were eventually relieved and sent back to Chittagong, where they got into the process of replenishing their animals and equipment. By the end of May 1943, 8th and 31st batteries too were relieved and they joined the regiment at Chittagong. A month later, they were transferred to Ranchi to join 20 Infantry Division. 17th battery left to join 32nd Indian Mountain Regiment. The regiment had thus fought continuously and well during the First Arakan campaign and provided close and accurate shooting in support of the infantry, without any damage to own troops.

In 1944, the regiment under 20 Indian Division was part of 4 Corps, which was at Tamu Road and Kabaw Valley. It consisted of 3rd (Peshawar) F.F., 8th (Lahore) and 31st (Jammu) batteries. The latter two batteries did well during an action at Kyauktaw. 20 Division was moved under 33 Corps under Fourteenth Army. On 22 January 1945, 3rd battery supported 32nd Indian Infantry Brigade in the capture of the important river port of Monywa. Following the crossing of the division across the Irrawaddy River, 8th and 31st battery saw fierce fighting on the night of 16 February 1945 near Myingyan. For his gallant actions, Captain C J S Burne of 31st battery was awarded the Distinguished Service Order. From there, the division rapidly moved to Magway. 3rd battery under 32 Brigade moved down the east bank of the Irrawaddy river to clear it as far as Allanmyo. The 8th battery formed the rear guard of the division and moved down the road to Prome, which was captured on 2 May 1945, thus blocking the escape route of the Japanese from Arakan. The 31st battery joined the force for the capture of Bassein, but found that the Royal Indian Navy had beaten them to it. Following this, the regiment went into camp for training at Minhla and then to Hmawbi.

Following the surrender of the Japanese in Singapore, 20 Division was moved from Burma to French Indochina to maintain law and order. The regiment carried out police duties in Saigon till January / February 1946. At Saigon, the regiment came in contact with Major Abhe of the Japanese 55th Mountain Artillery Regiment, who remarked that the 23rd was nicknamed the Devil Regiment of Artillery by the Japanese, for the destruction caused by the regiment's accurate and devastating artillery firing. In March 1946, 20 Division returned to India, but the regiment moved to Malaya under 7th Indian Infantry Division, where it continued with police work. The regiment returned to India by the end of 1946.

During the war, the regiment had won the following gallantry awards -

- Distinguished Service Order – Captain C J S Burne
- Military Cross – Major W B P Milne, Lieutenant S Kapilla, Lieutenant Brown, Lieutenant M Burrows
- Indian Distinguished Service Medal – Havildar Mahomed Khan, Signaller Shamsher Singh, Jemadar Mohamed Hussein

== Partition and re-raising ==
Following the partition of the country, 3rd (Peshawar) F.F and 8th (Lahore) moved to join the Pakistan Army. They joined 21st Mountain Regiment, which is presently 1 (SP) Medium Regiment, Pakistan Artillery. 31st became a field battery in Pakistan.

On 15 January 1953, the regiment was re-raised in India as 23 Mountain Composite Regiment (Pack) with the headquarters battery and the following three batteries of the erstwhile Indian States Forces -

- 74 (Gwalior) Mountain Battery
- 75 (Patiala) Mountain Battery
- 76 (Jammu and Kashmir) Mountain Battery

The regiment has since been converted to a field regiment, a medium regiment and is currently back as a field regiment.

== Operations ==
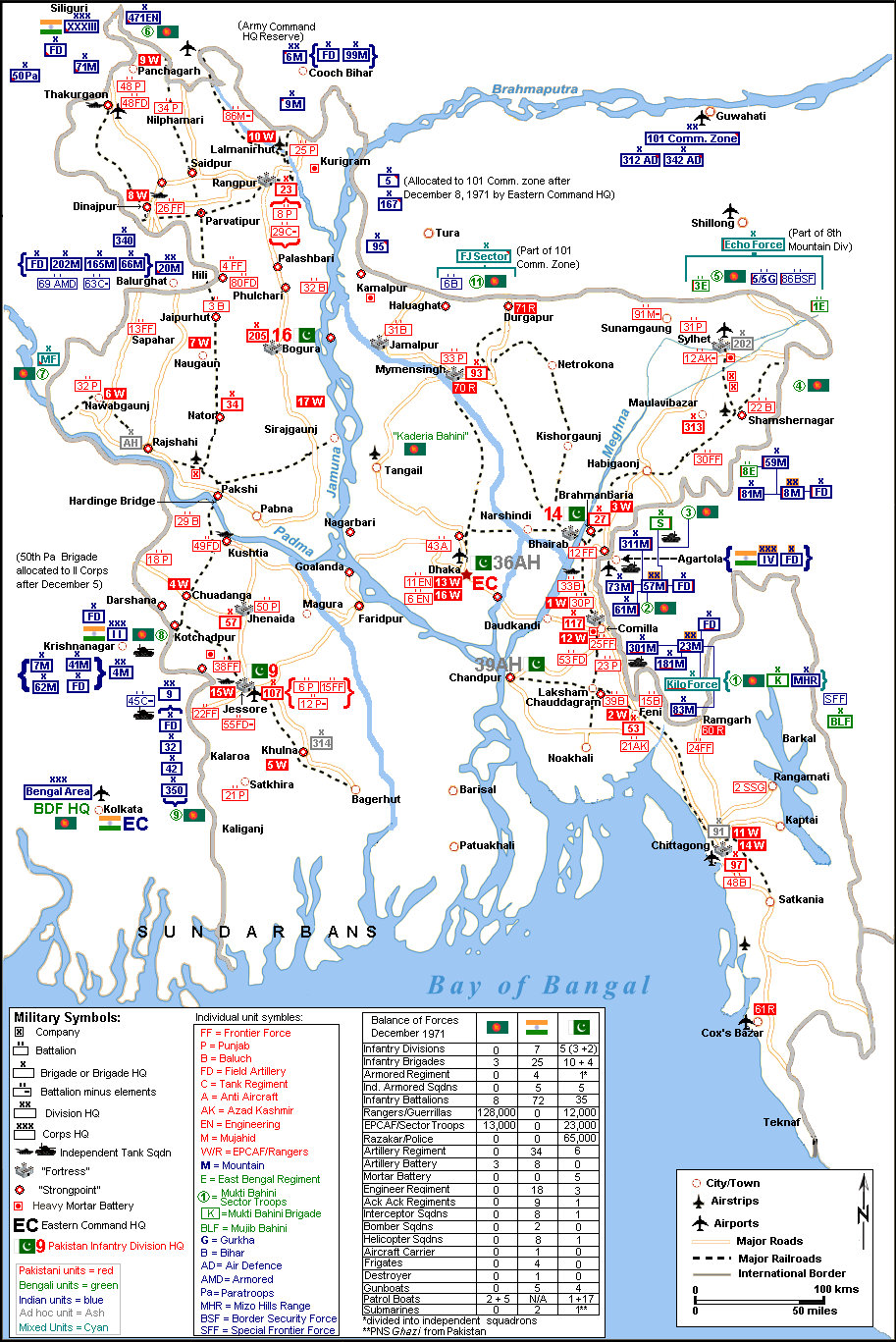
Deployment of troops in the eastern sector during the 1971 war

Indo-Pakistani War of 1965

23 Mountain Composite Regiment (Pack) commanded by Lieutenant Colonel H S Sihota was deployed in Jammu and Kashmir under 15 Corps. The Battle of OP Hill (NL1053) took place on 2 and 3 November 1965, after the ceasefire came into effect on 23 September 1965. OP Hill was a tactical Border Observation Post in the Bhimber-Gali-Mendhar Sector, 20 km south west of Poonch. This Observation Post (OP) was stealthily occupied by the Pakistani troops on 2 August 1965 and was being used by the Pakistanis to direct accurate artillery fire and to facilitate infiltration. To avoid isolation of Balnoi from Mendhar and Krishna Ghati and to safeguard Mendhar-Baloni and Mendhar-Poonch roads, the capture of OP Hill was of vital importance.

Following a failed battalion level offensive by 2 Garhwal on 6 and 7 October 1965, a full-fledged brigade attack was mounted on 2 November 1965. 120 Infantry Brigade was tasked to evict the enemy from this strategic location. After a tough battle lasting 2 days, the enemy was dislodged, with the regiment providing accurate artillery fire facilitating the capture and also using two guns in direct firing role. For its actions, 23 Mountain Composite Regiment along with 5 Sikh Light Infantry, 2 Dogra, 7 Sikh and 169 Mountain Regiment were awarded the battle honour OP Hill. The regiment won one Vir Chakra, five mentioned in despatches and one Chief of Army Staff Commendation Card. Major Jagdish Singh of Patiala Mountain Battery was awarded the Vir Chakra.

Indo-Pakistani War of 1971

The regiment was deployed under 57 Mountain Division of 4 Corps in the eastern sector during the war. It was equipped with 75/24 Pack Howitzers. It was commanded by Lieutenant Colonel Jagjit Singh. The regiment was involved in multiple operations involving 61 Mountain Brigade, which was detached from 57 Mountain Division to 23 Mountain Division. The regiment won one Vir Chakra, one Vishisht Seva Medal, one Sena Medal and one mentioned in despatches. Captain Uday Parshuram Sathe was awarded the Vir Chakra for his gallant actions.

Counter insurgency operations

The regiment has taken part in anti-terrorist operations in Jammu and Kashmir between 2008 and 2011.

== Honours and achievements ==
Italian East Africa, with provinces and provincial capitals, between May 7, 1936 (Annexation of Ethiopia) and August 1940 (when Italy invaded and annexed British Somaliland)

Eritrean Campaign 1941

- The honour title Ad Teclesan was conferred on 1 (Jammu and Kashmir) Mountain Battery (presently 76 (Jammu and Kashmir) Battery) during the Second World War. The battery equipped with 3.7 inch howitzers arrived in Sudan in November 1940. It then joined to become part of 5th Infantry Division during the campaign against the Italians in Eritrea (Italian East Africa). It took part in the final attack in the battle of Keren on 25 March 1941 as part of 10th Indian Infantry Brigade. The battery knocked down multiple Italian machine guns with direct hits facilitating the advance. Keren was occupied on 27 March. The battery, which was the only mountain battery in the battle, almost continuously fired from the morning of 25 March to the evening of 27 March. It then moved forward with the 29th Indian Infantry Brigade in the advance to capital city of Asmara. The battery's artillery fire proved decisive on 30 and 31 March 1941 on the Ad Teclesan position, the last Italian position covering the capital. The effectiveness of the battery in the face of heavy enemy fire and the repulse of a counterattack carried out by an Italian machine gun battalion earned the battery its honour title.
- The regiment earned its second honour title OP Hill during the Indo-Pakistan war of 1965.
- The famous Chinese Bell at Artillery Centre, Nasik Road was brought by the regiment from the Royal Palace at Beijing.
- The regiment has won a total of one Distinguished Service Order, six Military Crosses, three Indian Distinguished Service Medals, three Vir Chakras, one Sena Medal, 16 mentioned in despatches, three Chief of Army Staff Commendation Cards and five GOC-in-C Commendation Cards.
- During the 1971 war, Captain (later General and COAS) Deepak Kapoor served in the unit, before being attached to HQ 61 Mountain Brigade as a GSO3. He later commanded 74 Medium Regiment.
- Lieutenant General Jagdish Singh PVSM, VrC who had served in the regiment in the 1965 war went on to become Colonel Commandant and Director-General of the Regiment of Artillery. He was also Director Financial Planning and Director General Discipline.

== Regimental batteries ==
=== 74 (Gwalior) Battery ===
The Gwalior artillery was formed in Morar around 1865. It consisted on one battery each of Thakurs, Brahmins and Gujjars. The unit was organised as a mountain battery in 1926 and equipped with 2.75-inch guns. The battery traces its history to 1738, when it was raised as a bullock artillery battery of the Sindhia's army.

It saw action in Chitral in 1940. It joined 20th Mountain Regiment in April 1941 at Quetta and moved to Wana later that year, where it stayed till the end of the war. It returned to Gwalior state in February 1946. Post independence, the battery saw action in the Indo-Pakistani War of 1947–1948 and three personnel were mentioned in despatches. Among its commanders was Major (later Colonel) Prithipal Singh Gill, who had unique distinction of having served in all three services.

=== 75 (Patiala) Battery ===
Though initially a saluting battery in Patiala, in December 1942, it was moved to Ambala and turned into a mountain battery. After training, it joined the 31st Mountain Regiment in Kohat. It returned to the state in February 1946. The battery was among the first gunners to be flown in during the Indo-Pakistani War of 1947–1948 and was under 161 Infantry Brigade. It also saw action during Operation Eraze. Personnel from the battery were awarded eight mentioned in despatches. Major (later Lieutenant General) J F R Jacob commanded the battery shortly after independence.

=== 76 (Jammu and Kashmir) Battery ===
An artillery unit with mountain guns in the Princely State of Kashmir and Jammu is likely to have been in existence as early as 1848 during the Second Anglo-Sikh War. In 1889, the Kashmir artillery and infantry were the first to become Imperial Service Troops. The artillery was converted to No. 1 and No. 2 Kashmir Mountain Batteries in 1891 and 1892 respectively and were equipped with 7-pounder mountain guns. These guns were replaced with 2.5 inch screw guns in 1902, 10-pounder mountain guns in 1916, 2.75-inch guns in 1923 and 3.7-inch howitzers in 1939. The battery was handed over to the Indian Army in October 1942, where it became 30th (Jammu) Mountain Battery, Indian Artillery.

After the Second World War, the battery moved to Nowshera in November 1945. The battery was disbanded in Nowshera on 30 June 1946. The Dogra personnel of the battery were absorbed in a field battery of Royal Indian Artillery and the mules were taken over by the 5th (Bombay) Mountain Battery (now part of 57 Field Regiment). The Muslim personnel were absorbed by the 26th Jacob's Mountain Battery, which is now part of the 1st (SP) Medium Regiment (Frontier Force) of the Pakistan Army. 1 Jammu and Kashmir Mountain Battery was re-raised on 22 January 1948. The battery saw action during the Indo-Pakistani War of 1947–1948, where it provided effective artillery support to 77 Parachute Brigade during the Zoji La operations. Captain Risal Singh was awarded the Vir Chakra and four were mentioned in despatches.

The battery took part in the following operations and events –

- Hunza–Nagar Campaign, 1891
- Relief of Chitral, 1895
- Tirah campaign, 1897-8
- Delhi Coronation Durbar, 1903
- East African campaign (World War I) 1916-18
- East Persia Cordon, 1919–20
- Eritrea (World War II), 1940
- Syrian campaign, 1941
- Operations in Datta Khel, 1942
- Indo-Pakistani War of 1947–1948

== See also ==
- List of artillery regiments of Indian Army
