= List of mountain artillery =

Mountain artillery, which includes pack howitzers, mountain howitzers and mountain guns, is designed to accompany mountain infantry forces. Usually lightweight and designed to be broken down to be portable by pack animals or even soldiers, they often are in limited calibres with low muzzle energy. Correspondingly, range and anti-armor capabilities are limited. However, they can deliver useful firepower in locations that may be inaccessible to heavier support forces.

Caliber (mm)	Weapon name	Country of origin	Period
42	M1875 mountain gun	United States	Spanish–American War / Philippine–American War
63.5	RML 2.5 inch Mountain Gun	United Kingdom	Second Boer War
65	Canon de 65 Montagne mle 1906	Greece / France	World War I / World War II
65	Cannone da 65/17 modello 13	Italy	World War I / World War II
66	7 cm Gebirgsgeschütz M 75	Austria-Hungary	World War I
70	7 cm Gebirgsgeschütz M 99	Austria-Hungary	World War I
70	Cannone da 70/15	Italy	World War I
70	BL 10 pounder Mountain Gun	United Kingdom	World War I
70	BL 2.75 inch Mountain Gun	United Kingdom	World War I
70	Canon de Montagne de 70mm SA	France	World War I / World War II
75	Type 31 75 mm Mountain Gun	Japan	Russo-Japanese War
75	75 mm Schneider-Danglis 06/09	Greece / France	Balkan Wars / World War I
75	QF 2.95 inch Mountain Gun	United Kingdom / United States	World War I
75	7.5 cm Gebirgskanone L/13 C/80	German Empire	World War I
75	7.5 cm GebirgsKanone 06	German Empire	Balkan Wars / World War I / World War II
75	7.5 cm GebirgsKanone 13	German Empire	World War I
75	Ehrhardt 7.5 cm Model 1904	German Empire	World War I
75	Ehrhardt Model 1911	German Empire	World War I
75	7.5 cm M. 15 mountain gun (Škoda)	Austria-Hungary	World War I
75	Škoda 75 mm Model 1928	Czechoslovakia	World War II
75	Škoda 75 mm Model 1936	Czechoslovakia	World War II
75	Škoda 75 mm Model 1939	Czechoslovakia	World War II
75	Canon de 75 M mle 1919 Schneider	France	World War II
75	Canon de 75 M mle 1928	France	World War II
75	Kongsberg M.27	Norway	World War II
75	75 mm Pack Howitzer M1 / M116	United States	World War II
75	Obice da 75/18 Modello 34, 35	Italy	World War II
75	Bofors 75 mm Mountain Gun	Sweden	World War II
75	Bofors 75 mm Model 1934	Sweden	World War II
75	Type 41 75 mm Mountain Gun	Japan	2nd Sino-Japanese War
75	Type 94 75 mm Mountain Gun	Japan	2nd Sino-Japanese War
75	leGebIG 18	Nazi Germany	World War II
75	7.5 cm Gebirgsgeschütz 36	Nazi Germany	World War II
76	Canon de 76 M mle 1909 Schneider	France	World War I
76	76 mm mountain gun M48	Yugoslavia	Cold War
76.2	RML 7 pounder Mountain Gun	United Kingdom	Anglo-Zulu War / Second Boer War
76.2	76-mm mountain gun M1904	Russia	World War I
76.2	76 mm mountain gun M1909	Russia / Soviet Union	World War I / World War II
76.2	76-mm mountain gun M1938	Soviet Union	World War II
76.2	76 mm mountain gun M1958 (2A2)	Soviet Union	Cold War
80	De Bange 80 mm cannon	France	1877- World War I
87.6	Ordnance QF 25-pounder Short	Australia	World War II
94	3.7-inch mountain howitzer	United Kingdom	World War I / World War II
100	10 cm Gebirgshaubitze M 99	Austria-Hungary	World War I
100	10 cm Gebirgshaubitze M 8	Austria-Hungary	World War I
100	10 cm M. 16 mountain howitzer (Škoda)	Austria-Hungary	World War I
100	10 cm M. 16/19 mountain howitzer (Škoda)	Czechoslovakia	World War II
105	10.5 cm Gebirgshaubitze L/12	German Empire	World War I
105	10.5 cm Gebirgshaubitze 40	Nazi Germany	World War II
105	Canon Court de 105 M mle 1909 Schneider mountain gun	France	World War II
105	Canon Court de 105 M mle 1919 Schneider mountain gun	France	World War II
105	Canon Court de 105 M mle 1928 Schneider mountain gun	France	World War II
105	Skoda 105 mm Model 1939	Czechoslovakia	World War II
105	OTO Melara Mod 56	Italy	Cold War
105	Type 99 10 cm Mountain Gun	Japan	2nd Sino-Japanese War
150	Skoda 150 mm Model 1918	Austria-Hungary	Interwar
