= QF 2.95-inch mountain gun =

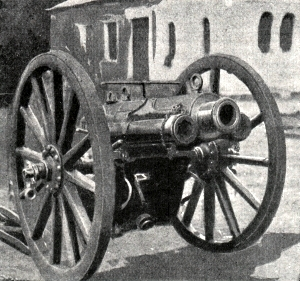
- British QF 2.95-inch mountain gun, Cameroons and Togoland campaign, WWI
- Type: Mountain gun
- Place of origin: United Kingdom

Service history
- In service: 1897 – World War II
- Used by: British Empire; United States • Philippines
- Wars: World War I, World War II

Production history
- Manufacturer: Vickers

Specifications
- Mass: 236 lb (107 kg) gun 830 lb (380 kg) total
- Barrel length: 31.6 in (800 mm) bore; 35.85 in (0.911 m) total
- Width: 32 in (810 mm)
- Height: 26 in (660 mm), barrel axis 36 inches, wheel
- Shell: Fixed QF round. 12.5 lb Common shell; 18 lb Double common shell; 12.5 lb Shrapnel
- Calibre: 75 mm (2.95 in)
- Recoil: 14 in (360 mm); short recoil hydro-spring
- Carriage: Wheeled, box trail, assembly
- Elevation: -10° - 27°
- Traverse: 0°
- Rate of fire: 14 rounds per minute
- Muzzle velocity: 920 ft/s (280 m/s)
- Maximum firing range: 4,825 yd (4,412 m)

The QF 2.95-inch mountain gun was the designation given by the British to a Vickers 75 mm calibre gun. It was originally produced for the Egyptian Army. It was taken into British service in the late 19th century to provide the 'movable armament' at some coaling stations. Also known as "The Millimetre Gun", it was used by the West African Frontier Force in several theatres in Africa during World War I. It was also used by the United States and the Commonwealth of the Philippines.

== Service history ==
The weapon could be broken down and carried by 4 horses or mules, or in British use in Africa by men. According to the U.S. patent 742973A, the separable gun-carriage was designed by Trevor Dawson and George Thomas Buckham.

=== British service ===
The weapon was not adopted by the British Army or the Indian Army, which used the BL 10 pounder Mountain Gun and later the BL 2.75-inch Mountain Gun, but it was used from 1900 by the defence forces of some British African colonies as part of the Royal West African Frontier Force (WAFF). The officers and most NCOs were British, and the gunners, gun carriers and some NCOs were African. As part of the British Empire these units became part of the British war effort in World War I.

Thirty guns were originally supplied to West Africa (Sierra Leone, Gold Coast and Nigeria). Guns involved in the West Africa campaign were used by the Sierra Leone Company Royal Garrison Artillery (6 guns), Gold Coast Battery WAFF (6 guns), 1st and 2nd Nigerian Battery WAFF (6 guns each).

The guns seem to have been fielded in small numbers as stockade breakers during the War of the Golden Stool, as The Ashanti Campaign of 1900 mentions their presence and details their correct tactical usage as follows: "Vickers, Sons, & Maxim's 75-millimetre mountain gun will breach any stockade in from three to six rounds; it is therefore most essential for this gun to be kept well up in front, and as soon as the scouts have located a frontal stockade, the gun should be mounted, run up to the front, and take up a position where either the top or bottom of the stockade can be seen. While fire is being opened with the gun, a company should be deployed to either flank, to a sufficient depth in the bush to outflank the ends of the stockade."

Guns of the Gold Coast Battery fired the first British Empire artillery rounds of World War I, in the attack on Khra in Togoland on 22 August 1914.

The gun was also used in the East Africa campaign, originally a section of the Gold Coast Battery, and from December 1916 the 1st Nigerian Battery.

In one action, Corporal Awudo Kano and five Nigerian gunners stayed by their gun during the British attack near Melong in Kamerun, 4 March 1915. Their officer was wounded and the infantry forced to retire, but though isolated they refused to abandon the officer or their guns, and continued firing until relieved.

=== US service ===
The US purchased 12 guns in 1899 and used them in the Philippine–American War (otherwise known as the Philippine Insurrection). By 30 June 1904 another 120 guns were purchased. Carriages and pack saddles were manufactured at Watertown and Rock Island.

When Brigadier General John Pershing entered Mexico in March 1916 in pursuit of the Mexican revolutionary and bandit, Francisco “Pancho” Villa, two field artillery batteries consisting of eight 2.95-inch howitzers were among his forces

It was also used in World War II by US and Philippine forces defending against the Japanese invasion. Approximately 50 were issued to the Filipino Army artillery regiments. The US Army Philippine Division had one battalion of the 23rd Artillery (Philippine Scouts) equipped with the 2.95 in mountain gun.

== Ammunition ==
=== British ammunition ===
The British "Treatise on Ammunition" of 1915 stated that available rounds were Shrapnel (203 bullets), Case shot (330 bullets), Star shell and the Double common shell of 18 lb (exploding charge of 14 oz "P" mixture – gunpowder).

British Double Common round	British Shrapnel round	No. 65A Fuze

=== US ammunition ===
According to the US manual of 1916 the 18 lb (8.2 kg) "Double explosive" shell was no longer in US use.

US Cartridge case	US HE shells	US Shrapnel shell

== Gallery ==
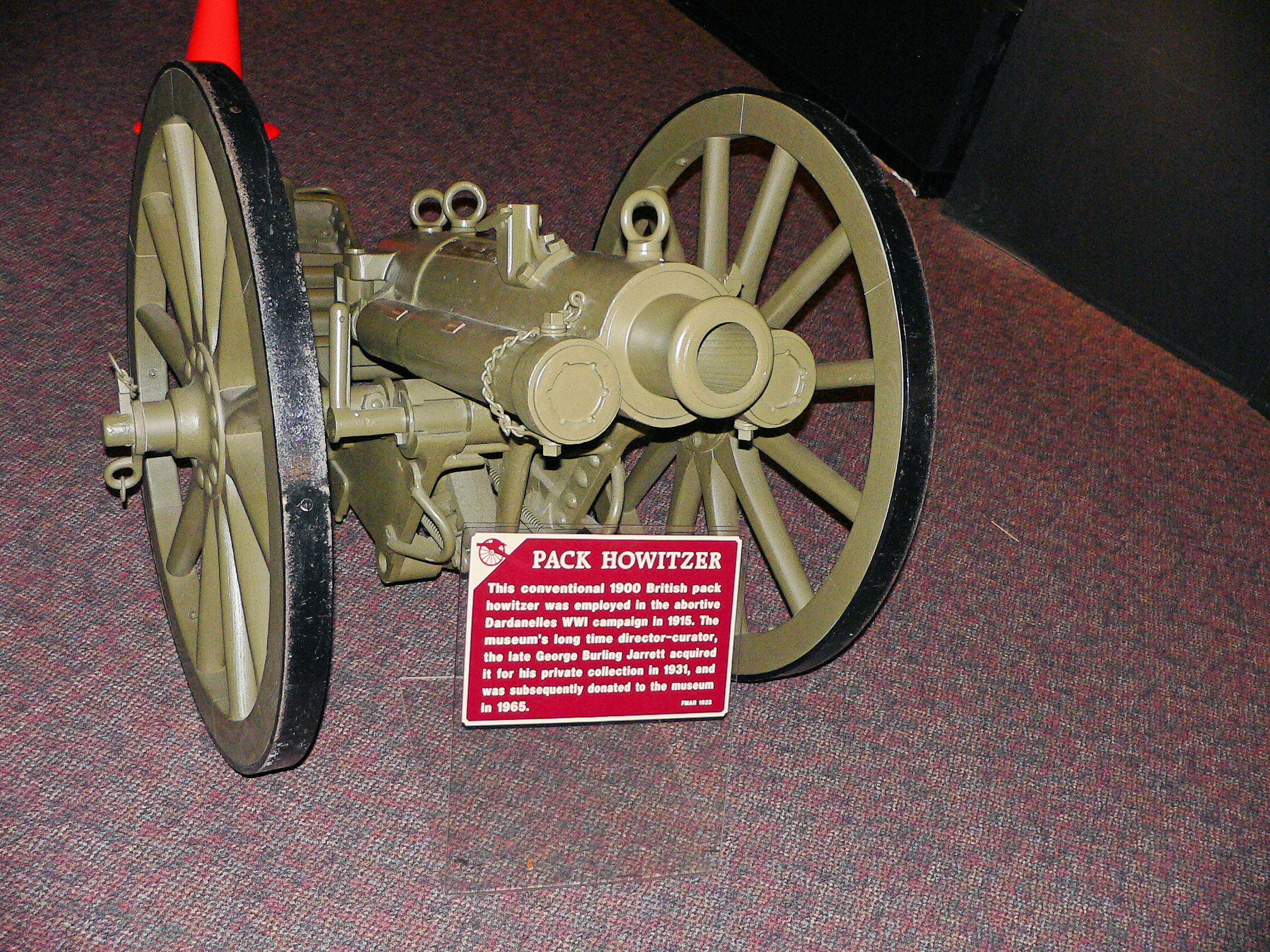
Front view of British example on display at US Army Ordnance Museum

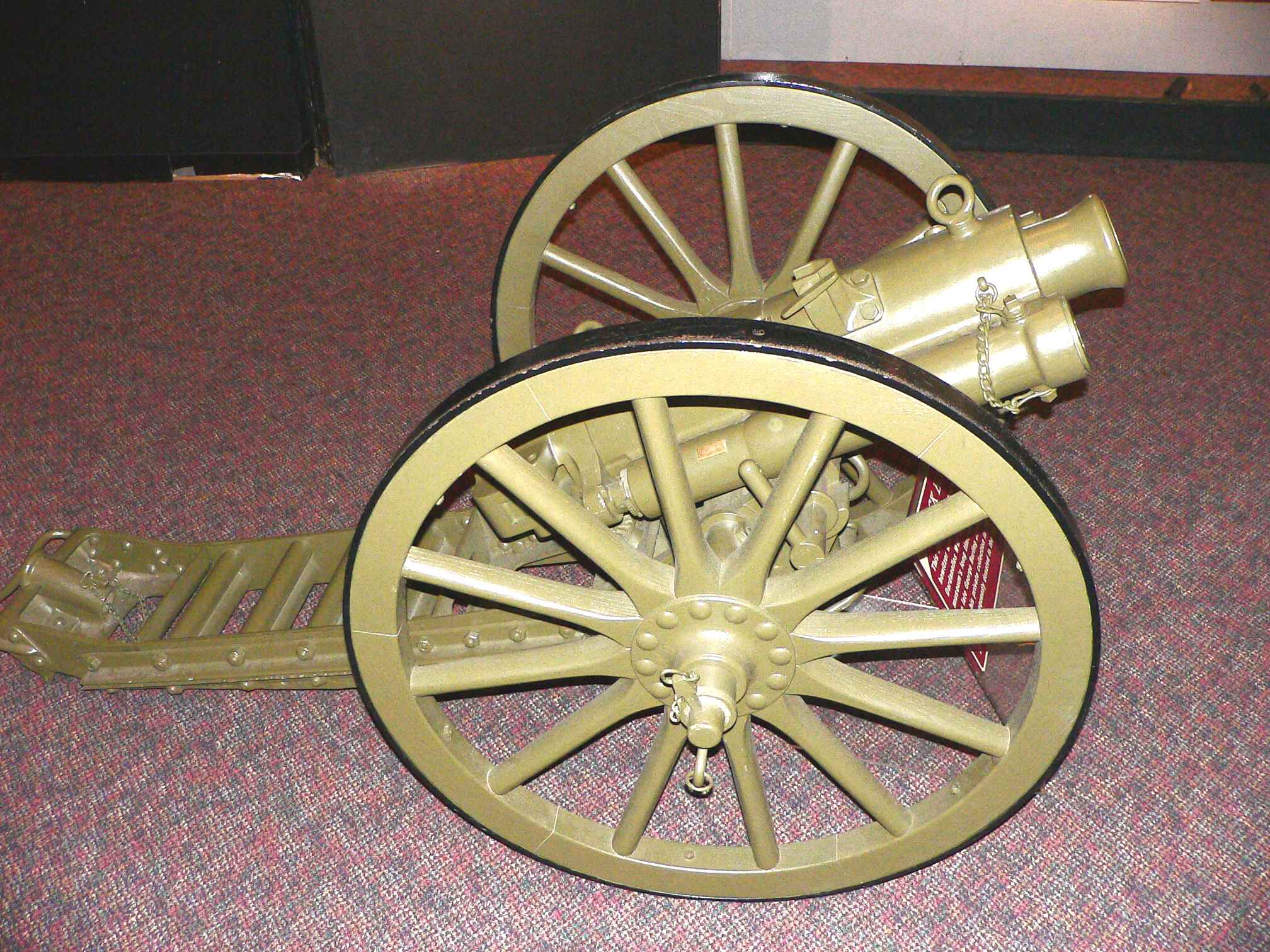
Side view of British example on display at US Army Ordnance Museum

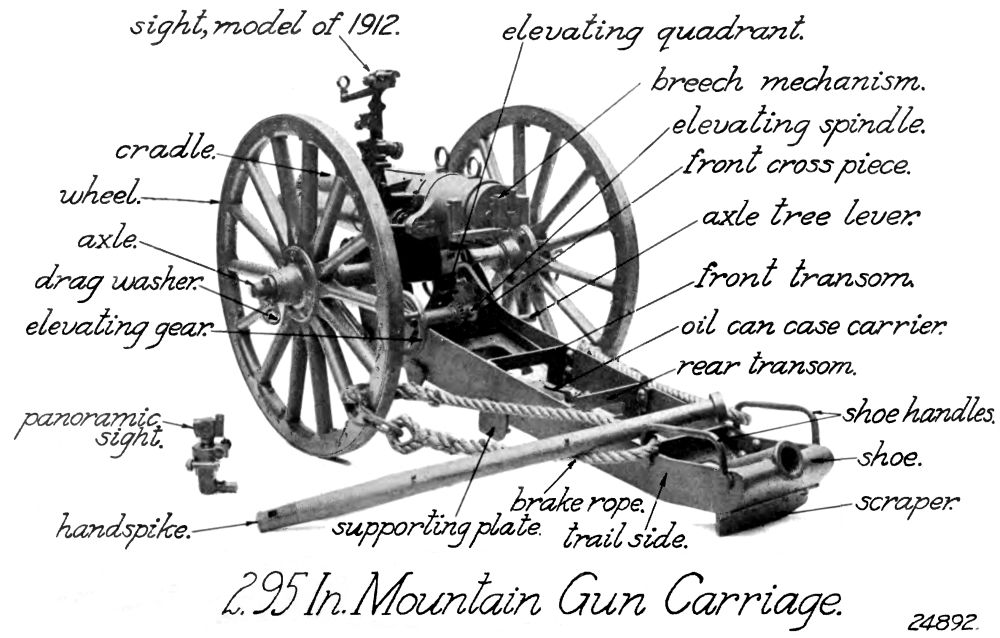
gun & carriage diagram

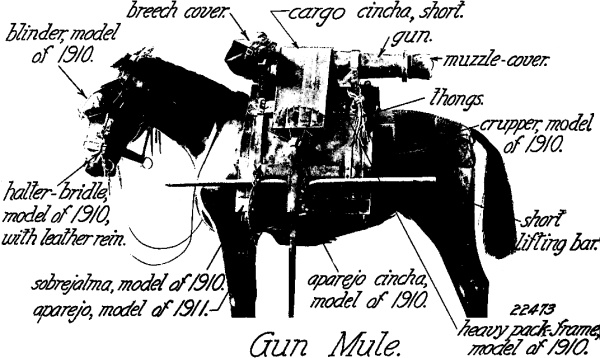
transportation of gun barrel by mule in US use

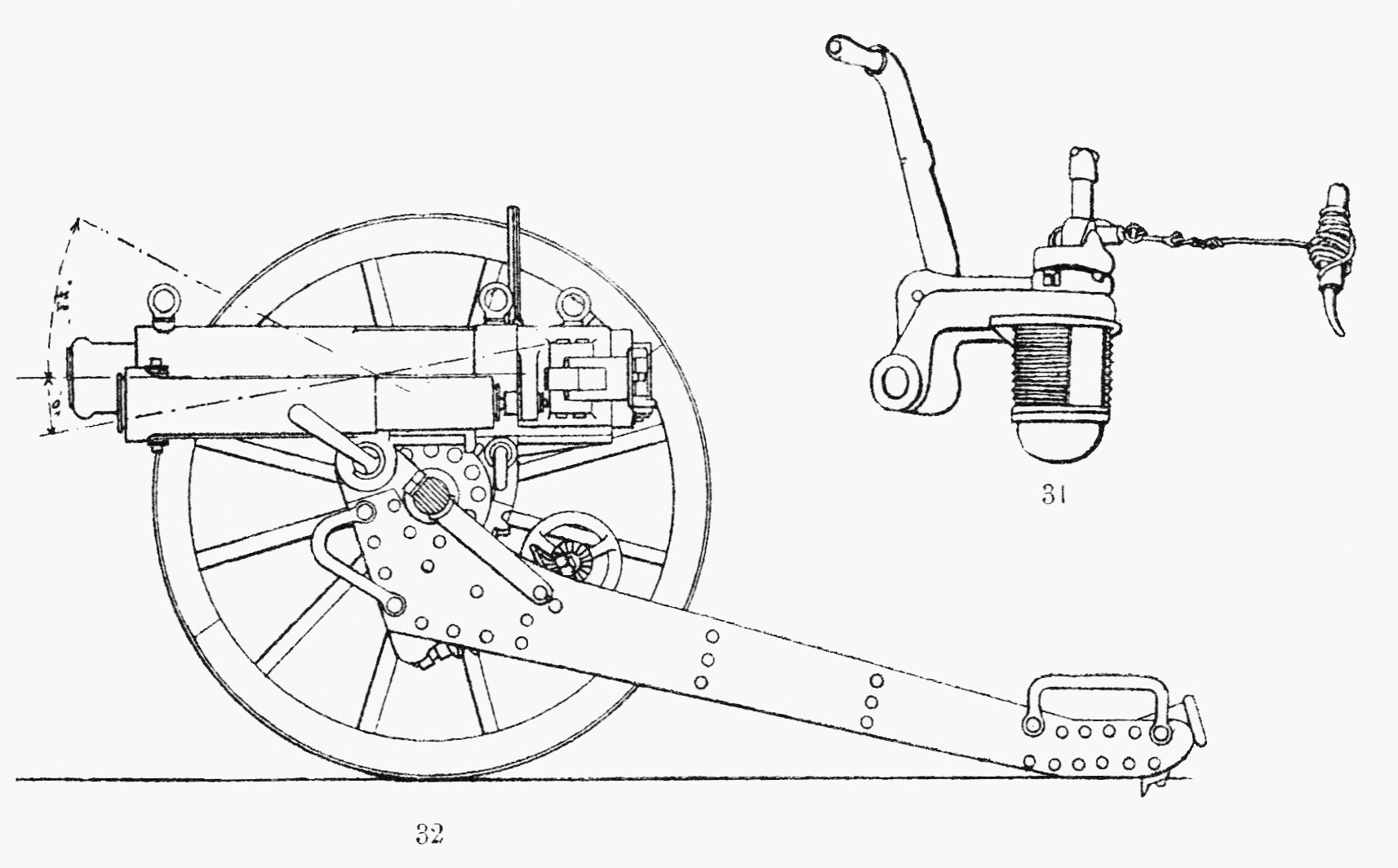
Illustration from Brockhaus and Efron Encyclopedic Dictionary

== See also ==
- List of mountain artillery
- West Africa Campaign (World War I)

== Surviving examples ==
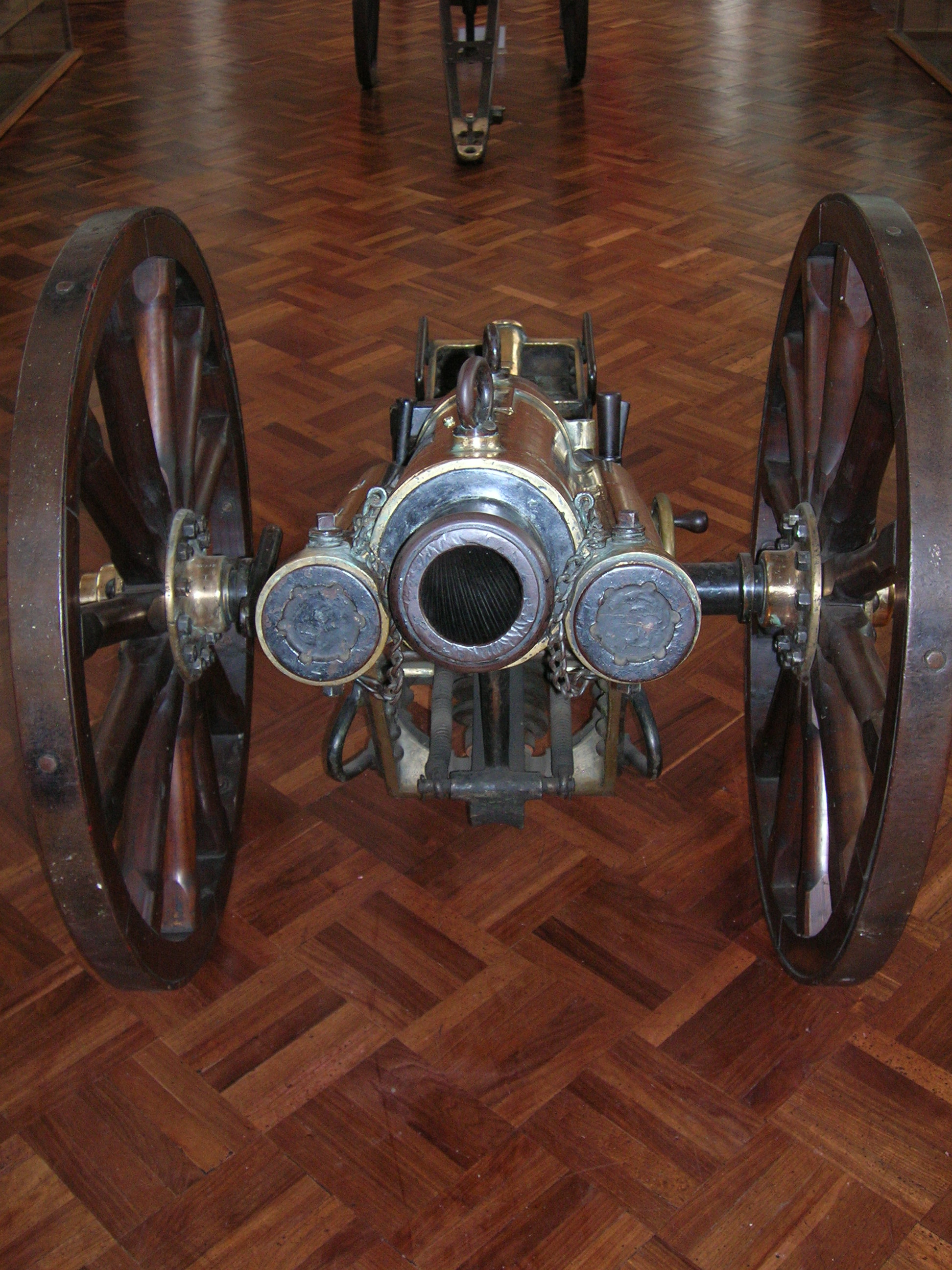
At the Military Museum in Bogotá, Colombia

- A British example is on display at US Army Ordnance Museum, Aberdeen Proving Ground, Maryland, United States
- HM Royal Armouries Fort Nelson, Fareham, Hampshire, UK
- At the Military Museum in Bogotá, Colombia
- U.S. Army Artillery Museum, Fort Sill, Oklahoma, United States

== Bibliography ==
- Dale Clarke, British Artillery 1914–1919. Field Army Artillery. Osprey Publishing, Oxford UK, 2004] ISBN 978-1-84176-688-1
- Major-General Sir John Headlam, The History of the Royal Artillery : From the Indian Mutiny to the Great War, Volume II (1899–1914). Woolwich [England] : Royal Artillery Institution, 1937. Facsimile reprint by Naval and Military Press 2004. ISBN 978-1-84574-043-6
- General Sir Martin Farndale, History of the Royal Regiment of Artillery : Forgotten Fronts and the Home Base 1914–18. London: Royal Artillery Institution, 1988. ISBN 978-1-870114-05-9
- I.V. Hogg & L.F. Thurston, British Artillery Weapons & Ammunition 1914–1918. London: Ian Allan, 1972. ISBN 978-0-7110-0381-1
- US Army Ordnance Dept, Handbook of the 2.95-inch Mountain Gun Matériel and Pack Outfit. 1912, updated 1916
- Louis Morton, "The Fall of the Philippines". United States Army Center of Military History, 1953. ISBN 978-1-410216960
