= 65mm =

65mm may refer to:

- Cannone da 65/17 modello 13, an Italian artillery piece.
- Canon de 65 M(montagne) modele 1906, a French mountain artillery piece, also used by the Germans under the name "6.5 cm Gebirgskanone 221(f)"
- 70 mm film
