= Canon Court de 105 M(montagne) modele 1909 Schneider =

Canon Court de 105M(montagne) modèle 1909 Schneider
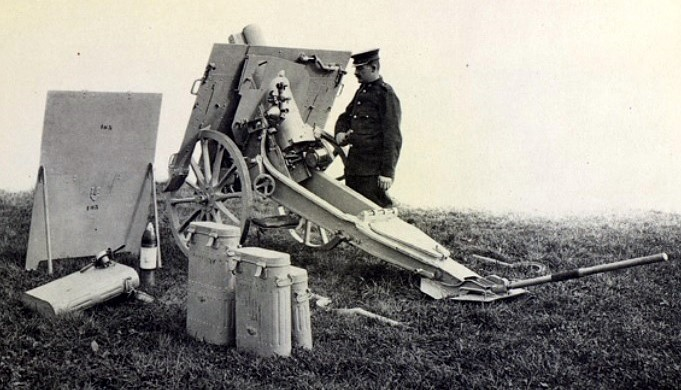
- A mle 1909 at maximum elevation.
- Type: Mountain gun
- Place of origin: France

Service history
- Used by: See § Users
- Wars: World War I; World War II

Production history
- Manufacturer: Schneider et Cie
- Produced: 1909

Specifications
- Mass: Combat: 730 kg (1,609 lbs); Travel: 750 kg (1,653 lbs)
- Barrel length: 1.1 m (3 ft 7 in) L/10.5
- Shell weight: 12 kg (26.4 lbs)
- Caliber: 105 mm (4.1 in)
- Breech: horizontal Sliding-block
- Carriage: Split trail
- Elevation: 0° to 60°
- Traverse: 5°
- Muzzle velocity: 300 m/s (984 ft/s)
- Effective firing range: 6,000 m (6,561 yds)

The Canon Court de 105 M(montagne) modèle 1909 Schneider (105 mm mle.1909) was a French mountain gun, manufactured by Schneider et Cie. According to Kennblätter fremden Geräts, Germany used the former French gun as the 10.5 cm GebH 343(f). The gun could be towed by a horse or mule.

According to Russian sources the 105 M Mle 1909 was evaluated in the autumn of 1915, and sent to the Putilov Works in 1916 to be modified for further testings and in order to meet Russian specifications, but ultimately it was never accepted into service and the gun remained in storage until the late 1980s before it was scrapped.

== Users ==
- France
- Nazi Germany

== Gallery ==
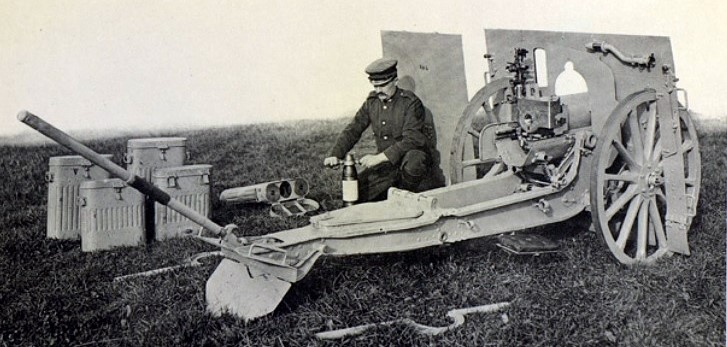
A gunner setting fuses.

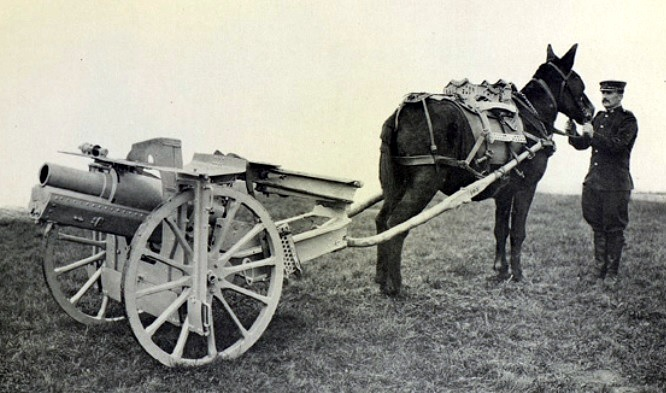
Configured for towing

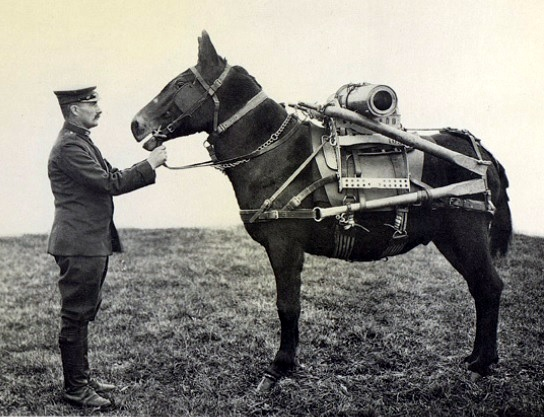
Barrel load

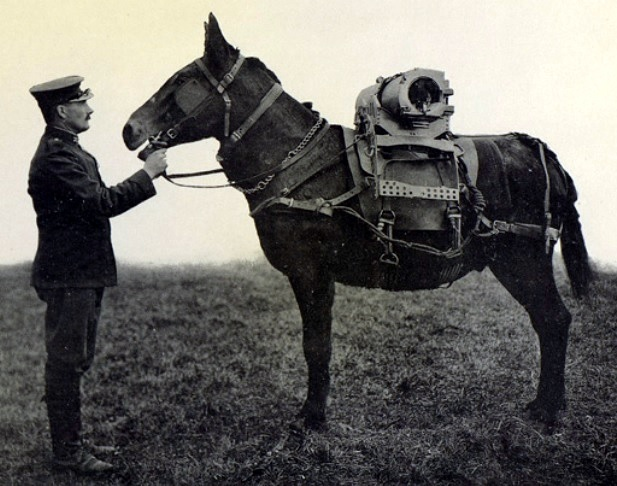
Breech load

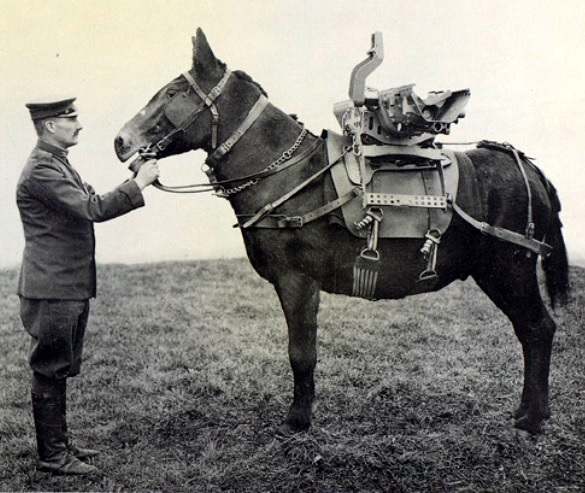
Recoil mechanism load

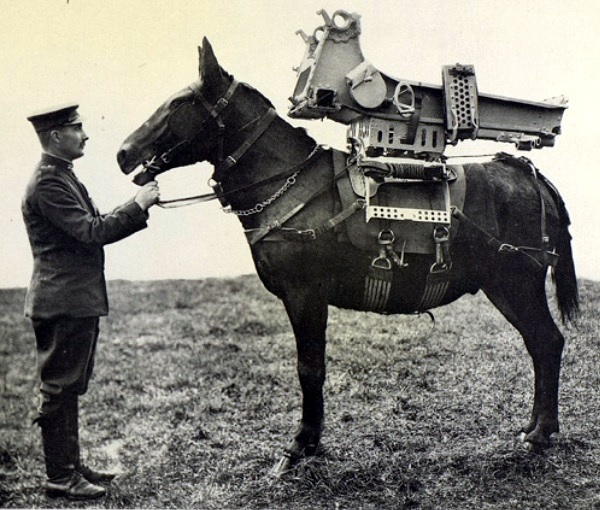
Carriage load

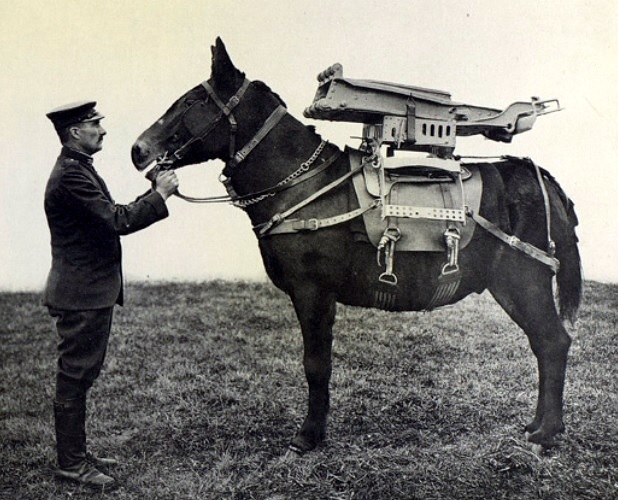
Carriage tail load

== See also ==
- Mountain artillery
- List of mountain artillery
