= 7.5 cm Gebirgskanone L/17 M.08 =

- Type: mountain gun
- Place of origin: Germany

Service history
- In service: 1908–1917
- Used by: German Empire; Portugal
- Wars: World War I

Production history
- Designer: Rheinmetall
- Manufacturer: Rheinmetall
- No. built: 12
- Variants: Horse-drawn

Specifications
- Mass: 529 kg (1,166 lb)
- Barrel length: 1.27 m (4 ft 2 in)
- Shell: 5.3 kilograms (12 lb)
- Caliber: 75 millimetres (3.0 in)
- Carriage: Pole trail
- Elevation: -7° to +30° (short trail), -7° to +38.5° (long trail)
- Traverse: 2.5°
- Muzzle velocity: 300 m/s (980 ft/s)
- Maximum firing range: 5,750 m (6,290 yd)

The 7.5 cm Gebirgskanone L/17 M.08 was a mountain gun, originally issued to the Schutztruppe in German South-West Africa.

An improvement on the Ehrhardt 7.5 cm Model 1904, the M.08 featured the same variable recoil system with a light, tubular trail and an optional shield (3.5mm at first, later 3mm). The reduction in shield thickness from the 3.5mm of the 1904 model saved 22 pounds of weight, but also meant that it could only deflect a 7.92mm S bullet at 350 yards instead of the 600 yards of the thicker shield. The gun and trail could be broken down into 5 pieces (and the shield into 7 pieces) for carry back pack animals. Twelve guns were sent to German South West Africa where they were grouped into 3 batteries with 4 guns each, replacing older 6cm and 7cm guns. They were also supplied to Portuguese colonial forces in Angola in 1906 and the Royal Netherlands East Indies Army. In 1914, during the Battle of Naulila, both Portuguese and German guns squared off with one another and both were reported to have good performance.

All of the Schutztruppe guns were surrendered to the South African Union Defense Force in July 1915 at Khur Ab and taken back to South Africa as war trophies. The best six guns were selected for use by the Defense Force and used until being withdrawn in 1917 due to poor condition. All 12 guns survived, but most are in poor condition.

== Current Locations ==
- South African National Museum of Military History, Saxonwold, Johannesburg
- Bloemfontein Free State Division, South Africa
- Bundeswehr Museum of German Defense Technology, Koblenz, Germany
- Union Buildings, Pretoria
- Solomon Mahlangu Regiment Museum at The View, Parktown mansions, Johannesburg
- Imperial War Museum, London
- Nomoya Masilela Museum, Bethal
- Memorable Order of Tin Hats Museum of Militaria and Moth Sanctuary, Durban
- Ermelo, South Africa War Memorial
