= 169 Medium Regiment (India) =

Indian Army artillery unit

169 Medium Regiment (OP Hill)
- Active: 1963 – present
- Country: India
- Allegiance: India
- Branch: Indian Army
- Type: Artillery
- Size: Regiment
- Mottos: SARVATRA, IZZAT-O-IQBAL “Everywhere with Honour and Glory”.
- Colors: "Red & Navy Blue"
- Decorations: Shaurya Chakra 2 Sena Medal 17; Mention in Despatches 3 COAS Commendation Card 45; VCOAS Commendation Card 4 GOC-in-C Commendation Card 64
- Battle honours: OP Hill

Insignia
- Abbreviation: 169 Med Regt

169 Medium Regiment (OP Hill) is part of the Regiment of Artillery of the Indian Army.

== Formation ==
The regiment was raised as 169 Field Regiment in Naushera on 1 November 1963 under the command of Lieutenant Colonel HS Dhaliwal. The class composition of this unit is ‘Maratha’ with the war cry ‘Chhatrapati Shivaji Maharaj Ki Jai’. The regiment is presently a medium regiment.

== Operations ==
Indo-Pakistani War of 1965

The Battle of OP Hill (NL1053) took place after the ceasefire came into effect on 23 September 1965. OP Hill was a Border Observation Post in the Bhimber-Gali-Mendhar Sector, 20 km south west of Poonch. This Observation Post (OP) was being used by the Pakistanis to direct accurate artillery fire. To avoid isolation of Balnoi from Mendhar and Krishna Ghati, capture of OP Hill was imperative.

120 Infantry Brigade was tasked to evict the enemy from this strategic location. Following a failed battalion level offensive by 2 Garhwal on 6 and 7 October 1965, a full-fledged brigade attack was mounted on 2 November 1965. After a grim battle lasting 2 days, the enemy was dislodged. For its actions, the 169 Mountain Regiment along with 5 Sikh Light Infantry, 2 Dogra, 7 Sikh and 23 Mountain Composite Regiment were awarded the battle honour OP Hill.

Counter Insurgency Operations

169 Field Regiment was inducted in the Kashmir Valley in July 1992 when militancy was at its peak. In the atmosphere as was prevailing then, the unit adapted itself to face the gauntlet thrown by the terrorists within an impressive timeframe. It carried out multifarious operations including cordon and search, raids, ambushes, road opening duties, protection of a sensitive army petroleum depot and higher headquarters, as also neutralization of militants in its area of responsibility. The unit was able to achieve commendable results in its drive against the terrorists. In one of its numerous successful operations, the unit apprehended Mohammed Sheikh Yaqoob, the self-styled Divisional Commander of Al-Jehad for Anantnag and Pulwama districts. The arrest created a vacuum in the ranks of Al-Jehad, which became a defunct group. The unit was instrumental in apprehension of 128 local terrorists who were in the process of crossing over to Pakistan in August 1993, for training in terrorist camps in the Pakistani-administered Kashmir. The unit had earned the J & K Governor's Silver Salver in 1995. The Regiment received the COAS unit citation for Operation Rakshak in 1996.

During its counter-insurgency operations in Assam, the Shaurya Chakra was awarded to Major Gautam Segan and Major Gurtej Singh Grewal in 2001.
Along with other medals and other honours, it was also awarded the Unit Appreciation by Army Commander, Eastern Command in 2003.

United Nations

The Regiment was the first Indian Artillery unit to be nominated on a UN Mission. The Regiment took part in the United Nations Organization Stabilization Mission (MONUSCO) in the Democratic Republic of the Congo in 2008-2009 and United Nations Disengagement Observer Force (UNDOF) in Golan Heights in 2009–2010. The Regiment was awarded the Force Commander's Unit Appreciation in 2010 during its tenure in Golan Heights.

== Achievements ==
- The Regiment had the honour of participating in the annual Republic Day parade in 1990 with their Indian Field Guns.

== See also ==
- List of artillery regiments of Indian Army
