= Ehrhardt 7.5 cm Model 1904 =

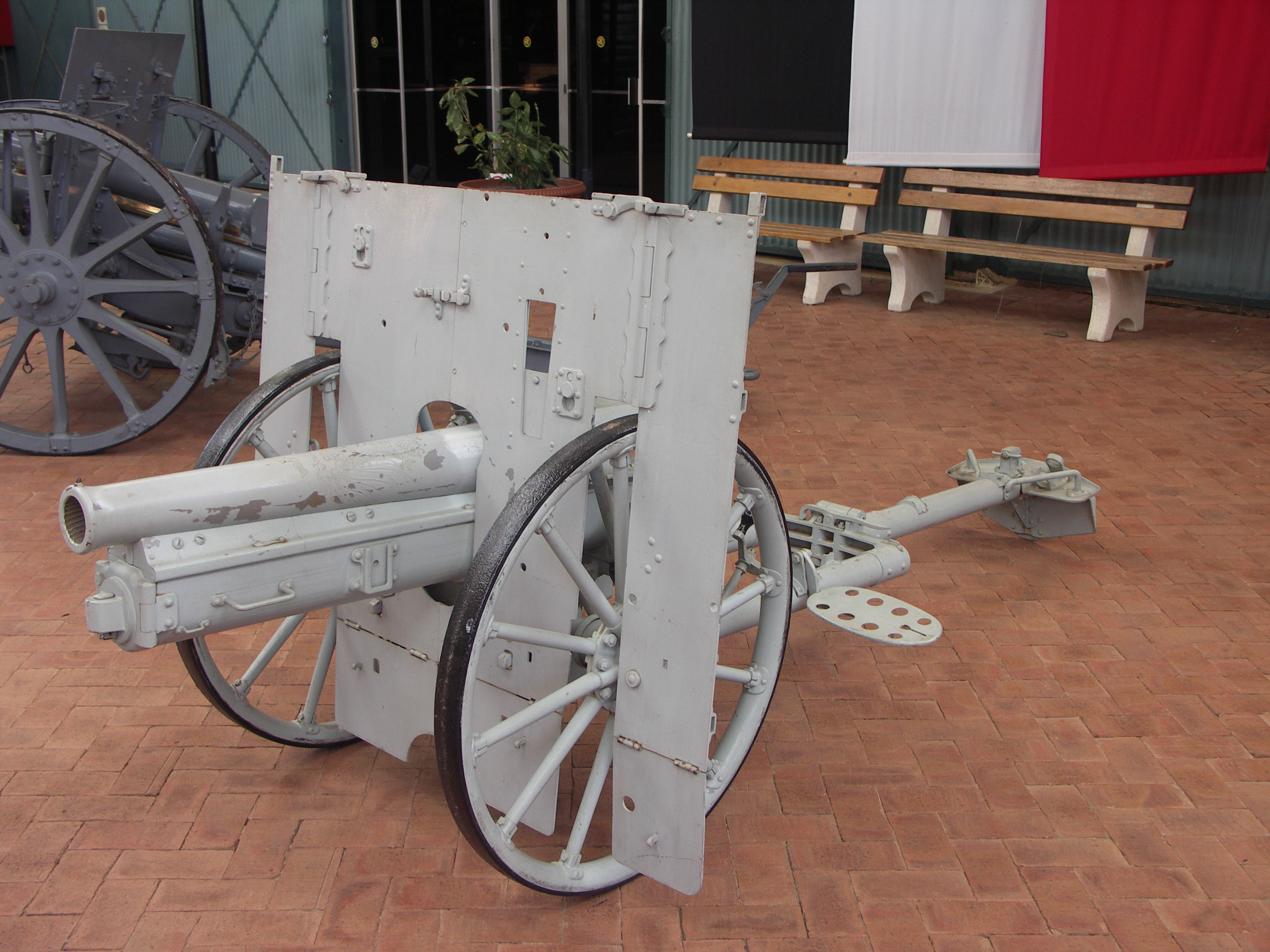
- Type: mountain gun
- Place of origin: Germany

Service history
- In service: 1904–1917
- Used by: German Empire; Portugal
- Wars: World War I

Production history
- Designer: Rheinmetall
- Manufacturer: Rheinmetall
- No. built: 12
- Variants: Horse-drawn

Specifications
- Mass: 529 kg (1,166 lb)
- Barrel length: 1.27 m (4 ft 2 in)
- Shell: 5.3 kilograms (12 lb)
- Caliber: 75 millimetres (3.0 in)
- Carriage: Pole trail
- Elevation: -7° to +38.5°
- Traverse: 2.5°
- Muzzle velocity: 300 m/s (980 ft/s)
- Maximum firing range: 5,750 m (6,290 yd)

The Ehrhardt 7.5 cm Model 1904 mountain guns were originally issued to the Schutztruppe in German South-West Africa.

The 1904 was advanced for its time, and was possibly the first mountain gun that had a variable recoil system (though one source claims this belongs to the 7.5 cm Gebirgskanone L/17 M.08). The standard recoil systems of the time brought the barrel back to its original position after firing, which increased the reloading speed. When used on mountains, however, they tended to drive the breech into the ground or the carriage's trail. Erhardt deduced that if a higher angle of fire was adopted then less recoil would be produced, so created a system where the recoil was determined by the angle of elevation. This, along with the weight of a gunner in a seat on each side of the trails, improved stability.

== See also ==
- Ehrhardt 7.5 cm Model 1901
