= RML 7-pounder mountain gun =

Ordnance RML 7-pounder Mk IV mountain gun
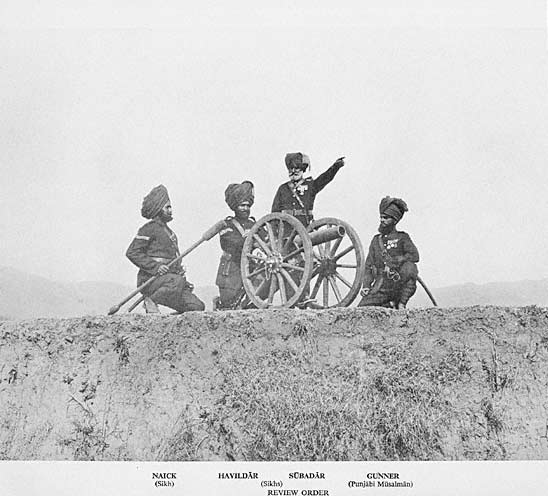
- No. 4 (Hazara) Mountain Battery with RML 7-pounder circa. 1895
- Type: Mountain gun
- Place of origin: United Kingdom

Service history
- In service: 1873–1919
- Used by: British Empire; India
- Wars: Anglo-Zulu War; First Boer War; Second Boer War; Anglo-Aro War; North-West Rebellion

Specifications
- Mass: 200 lb (91 kg) barrel
- Barrel length: 3 ft (0.91 m)
- Shell: 7 lb 11 oz (3.5 kg) (shrapnel); 7 lb 4 oz (3.3 kg) (common); 12 lb 4 oz (5.6 kg) (double)
- Calibre: 3 in (76 mm)
- Traverse: nil
- Muzzle velocity: 968 ft/s (295 m/s)
- Maximum firing range: 3,000 yd (2,700 m)

The Ordnance RML 7-pounder Mk IV "Steel Gun" was a British rifled muzzle-loading mountain gun. 7-pounder referred to the approximate weight of the shell it fired.

== History ==
Development began in 1864 to replace the RBL 6-pounder 2.5-inch (64 mm) gun of 3 long hundredweight (340 lb; 150 kg), which had proved too heavy for a mountain gun. Several Mks of 7-pounder RML of 2 long hundredweight (220 lb; 100 kg) were tried in 1865 by boring out and rifling old SBML bronze guns, but were still too heavy.

Several Mks of new steel barrels (the first British all-steel gun, hence the name "Steel Gun") were then produced of 190 lb (86 kg) and 150 lb (68 kg) but were not considered powerful enough.

Mk IV of 200 lb (91 kg) with a longer bore was settled on for production in 1873.

It was superseded by the RML 2.5-inch Mountain Gun from 1879.

== Combat use ==
It could be assembled and a round loaded in 20 seconds. Its common shell was considered ineffective. To give it a high angle capability, a double shell was produced of increased length and containing a larger bursting charge. This was fired with a reduced charge, but the low muzzle velocity did not always arm the fuze, or prevent the over-long projectile from somersaulting. Shell rotation was effected by studs on the body of the shell. Elevation was by quoin or wedge and by screw.

=== Anglo-Zulu War 1879 ===
Britain deployed several guns mounted on Colonial (or "Kaffraria") carriages: light field gun type carriages with larger wider-spaced wheels suited for being horse-drawn across long grass. Two of these guns deployed as field guns of the N/5th Brigade, Royal Field Artillery were lost in the disastrous Battle of Isandlwana.

=== Second Anglo-Afghan War ===
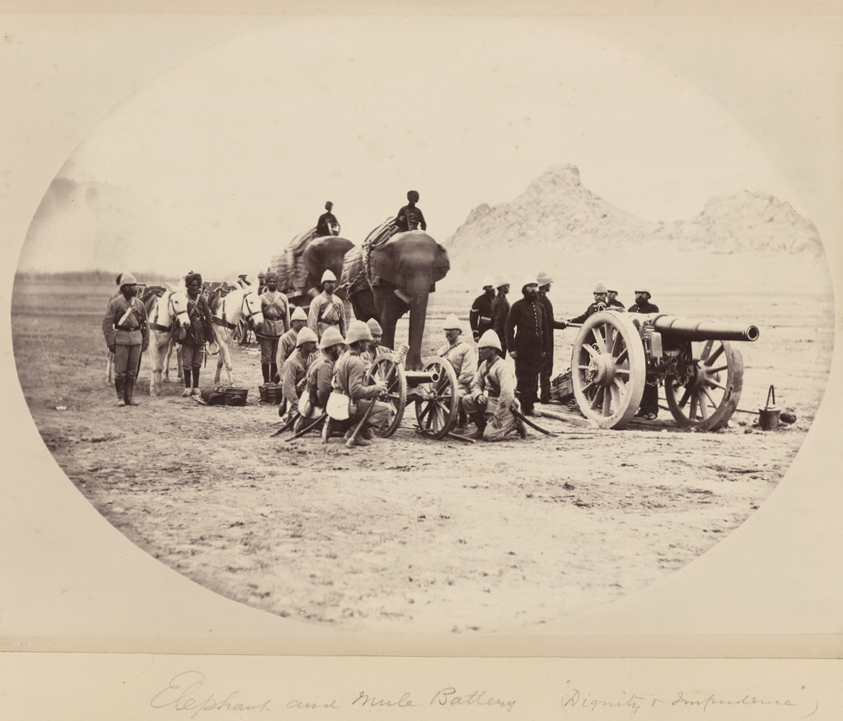
Titled "Dignity & Impudence" for stereotypic personality traits of elephants and mules respectively, this photograph by John Burke (photographer) shows an elephant and mule battery during the Second Anglo-Afghan War. The mule team would have hauled supplies or towed the small field gun, while the elephants towed the larger gun. The gun appears to be a Rifled Muzzle Loader (RML) 7-pounder mountain gun. The men in the photograph are a mix of British soldiers and Indian sepoys. The group kneeling around the smaller, muzzle-loaded field gun is preparing to fire after the soldier at front left has used the ramrod to jam the charge down into the gun. The gun at right, towed by elephants, appears to be a Rifled breech loader (RBL) 40-pounder Armstrong (RBL 40-pounder Armstrong gun)

An RML 7-pounder Mountain Gun appears to be present in a photograph by John Burke (photographer) from the Second Anglo-Afghan War (November 1878 – September 1880). The war began when Great Britain, fearful of what it saw as growing Russian influence in Afghanistan, invaded the country from British India. The first phase of the war ended in May 1879 with the Treaty of Gandamak, which permitted the Afghans to maintain internal sovereignty but forced them to cede control over their foreign policy to the British. Fighting resumed in September 1879, after an anti-British uprising in Kabul, and finally concluded in September 1880 with the decisive Battle of Kandahar.

=== First Boer War 1880–1881 ===
Britain deployed 4 guns mounted on standard small mountain carriages during the war.

=== War of the Golden Stool 1900 ===
The West African Frontier Force fielded a number of guns in the War of the Golden Stool, their use being fairly heavily referenced by Willcocks, Armitage and Montanaro in their books on the campaign. Bartlett also references the Central Africa Regiment having a battery of 7-pounder guns attached to A Company in 1898, with the Central Africa Regiment taking part in the war.

=== Second Boer War 1899–1902 ===
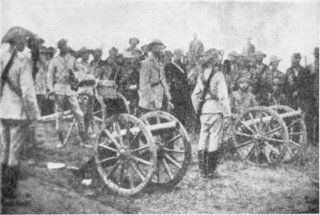
Boers with guns on mountain carriages captured at Kraaipan at the beginning of the war

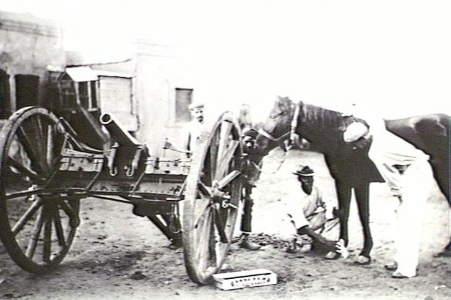
Gun on field carriage at Mafeking

The gun was employed mounted on armoured trains and used by local militia forces early in the war.

It was also employed mounted on normal field carriages with larger wheels which increased mobility in the long grass and allowed it to be towed by horses.

=== Anglo-Aro War ===
Column No. 4 of The British assembled Aro Field Force deployed one 7-pounder gun during the battles in and around Arochukwu.

== See also ==
- Battle of Laing's Nek
- List of mountain artillery

== Surviving examples ==
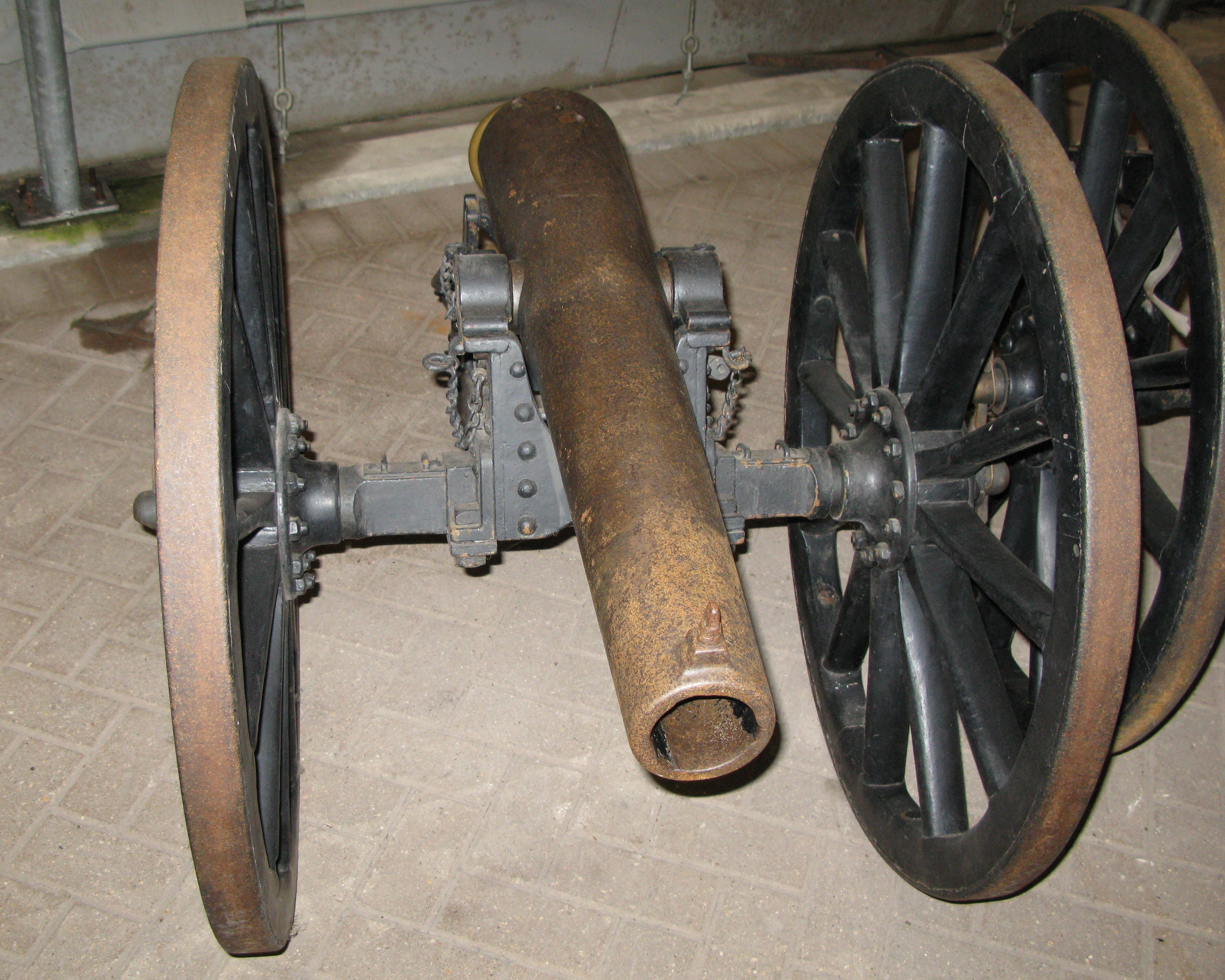
An example from 1885, at Royal Armoury, Fort Nelson, UK

Today, several examples of the guns still exist around the world :

- at the Regional Military Training Center in Darulaman Garrison, Kabul. The garrison is near the palaces, and south of the Bala Hissar where the British had their headquarters during the Anglo-Afghan wars.
- A gun at Royal Armoury, Fort Nelson, UK
- Royal Artillery Museum, London
- South African National Museum of Military History, Johannesburg, South Africa

== Bibliography ==
- Major Darrell D Hall, "Guns in South Africa 1899-1902" in The South African Military History Society Military History Journal – Vol 2 No 1, June 1971
- Major Darrell D. Hall, "Field Artillery of the British Army 1860–1960. Part I, 1860 – 1900" in The South African Military History Society. Military History Journal – Vol 2 No 4, December 1972 (web page is incorrectly titled 1900–1914)
- W. L. Ruffell, The Gun – Rifled Ordnance: Mountain Artillery. RML 7-pounder
