= Canon de 65 M (montagne) modele 1906 =

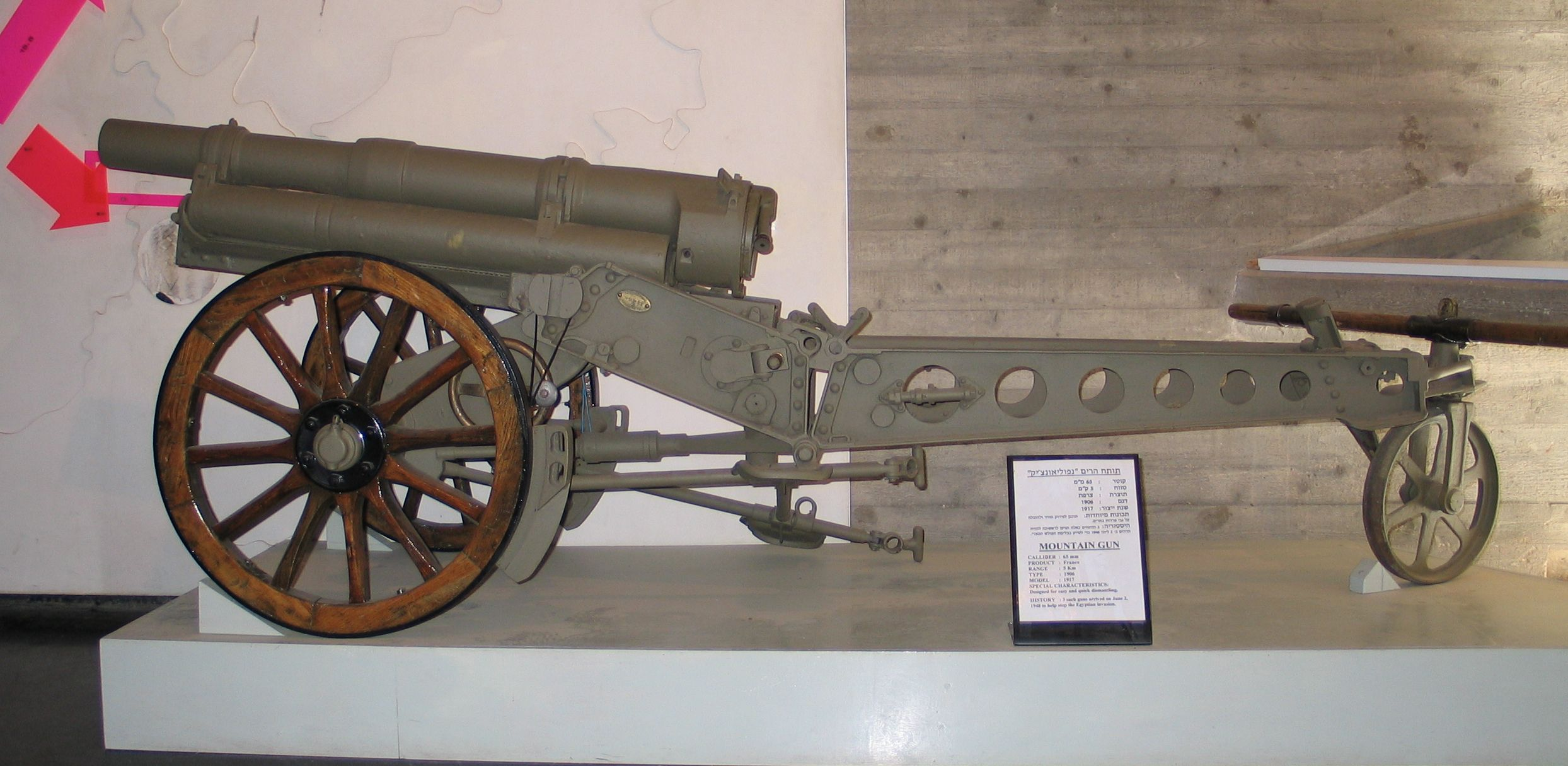
- 65 mm mle 1906 in Yad Mordechai, Israel.
- Type: Mountain artillery
- Place of origin: France

Service history
- Used by: See § Users
- Wars: World War I; World War II; Polish–Soviet War; Greco-Turkish War; 1948 Arab–Israeli War

Production history
- Designer: Colonel Ducrest
- Manufacturer: Schneider

Specifications
- Mass: 400 kg (882 lbs)
- Barrel length: 1.3 m (4 ft 3 in) L/20.5
- Shell: Fixed QF 65 × 167 mm R
- Shell weight: 4.4 kg (10 lbs)
- Caliber: 65 mm (2.5 in)
- Breech: Nordenfelt eccentric screw
- Recoil: Hydro-spring
- Carriage: Box trail
- Elevation: −9° to +35°
- Traverse: 6°
- Rate of fire: 18 rpm
- Muzzle velocity: 330 m/s (1,082 ft/s)
- Effective firing range: 6.5 km (4 mi)

The Canon de 65 M modele 1906 where M stands for "montagne", or briefly 65 mm Mle 1906 where "mle" stands for "modèle", was a French mountain gun which entered service with the régiments d'artillerie de montagne in 1906 and was one of the first soft-recoil guns in service. The carriage of the Mle 1906 was hinged and could be broken down into four mule loads for transport. By 1939, the weapon was generally used as an infantry support gun. After 1940, the Germans used the guns as the 6,5 cm GebK 221(f). The gun was also used by Israel in 1948 Arab–Israeli War as Napoleonchik, and by Albania, Poland and Greece.

== Combat history ==
=== France ===
During World War I the French Armée d’Orient used the Mle 1906 against the forces of the Central Powers in the mountains of Macedonia. There were 72 Mle 1906 guns in service in the Balkans theatre during the allied breakout from the Salonica bridgehead on September 15–29, 1918. The initial success of this allied offensive led Bulgaria to capitulate on October 9, 1918, later in October 1918 Serbia was liberated and lastly Austria-Hungary capitulated in November 1918 when faced with invasion from Italian forces from the south.

Still in service with the French Army in 1939-1940, a few were taken over by the Wehrmacht, as 6,5 cm Gebirgskanone 221 (f).

=== Israel ===
The Canon de 65 M (Montagne) Modèle 1906 was used by the Israel Defence Forces in the 1948 Arab–Israeli War, and was nicknamed Napoleonchik by the Israelis due to its old look.

The first use of two of these cannons, lacking sights, was made in the Battle of Degania in northern Israel, which was also the first time the Israeli side employed field artillery. Subsequent uses were made in numerous major operations in the war, including Operation Bin Nun and Operation Pleshet.

== Users ==
- Albania
- France
- Nazi Germany
- Greece
- Israel
- Poland

== Gallery ==
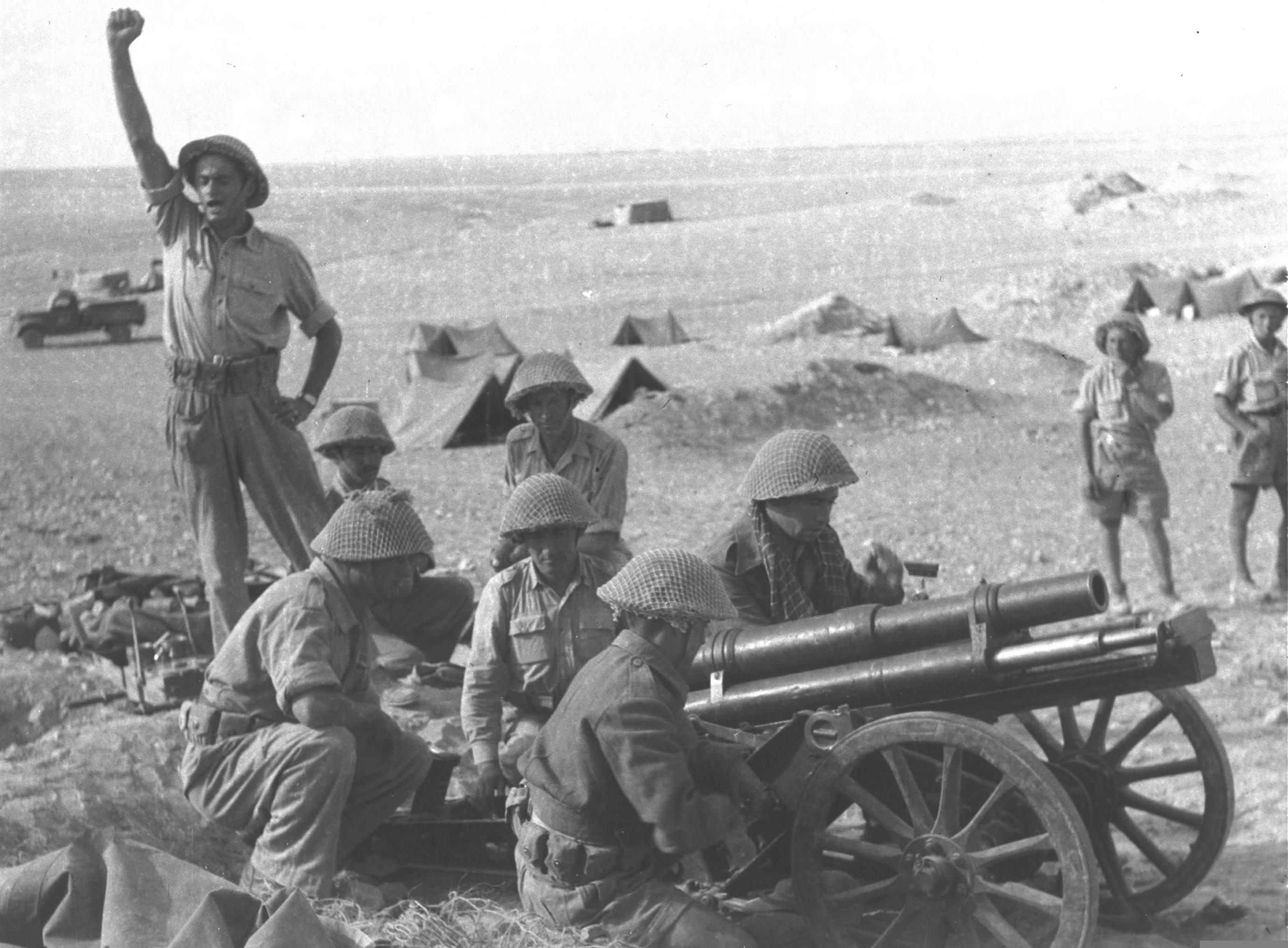

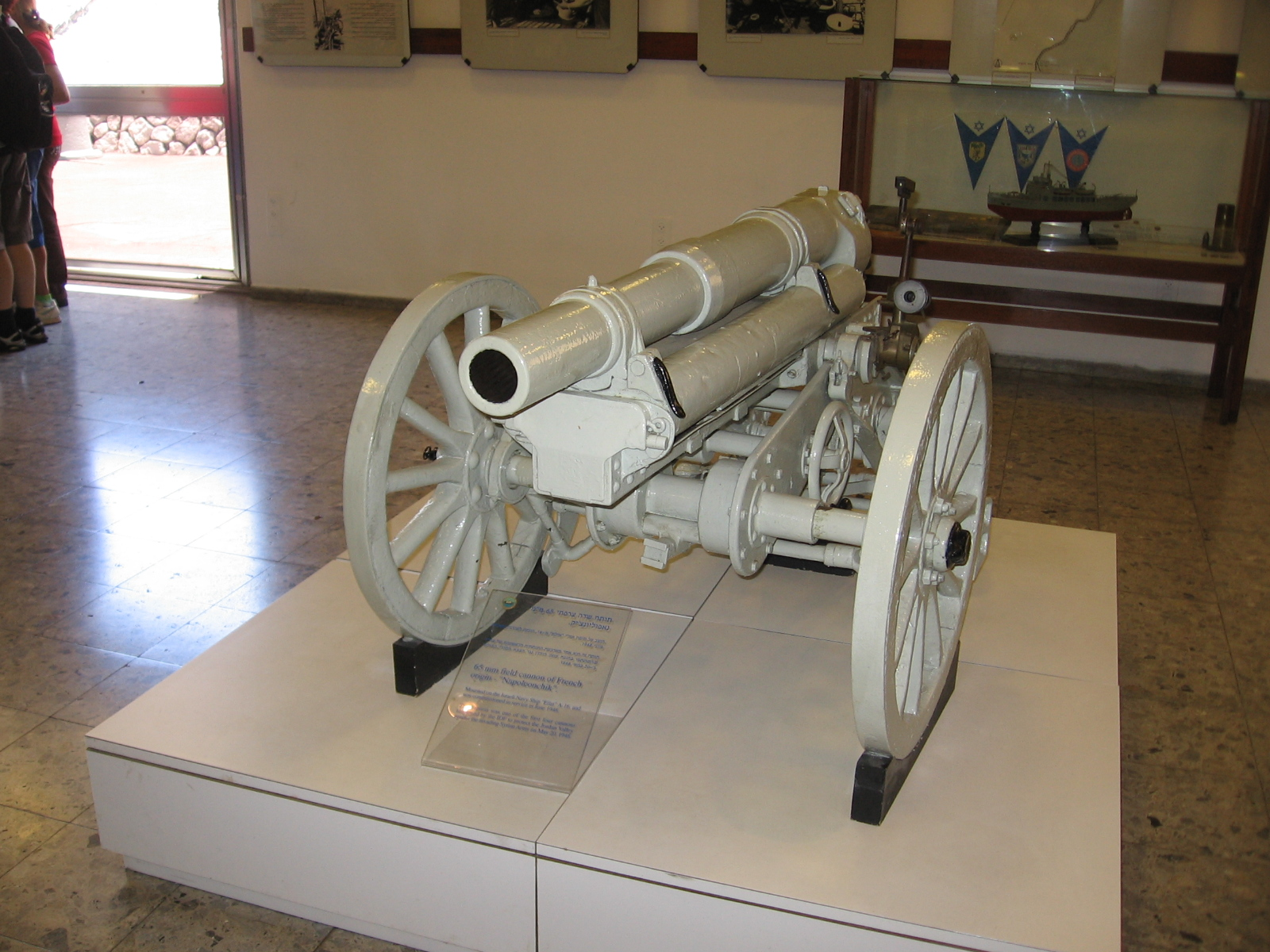

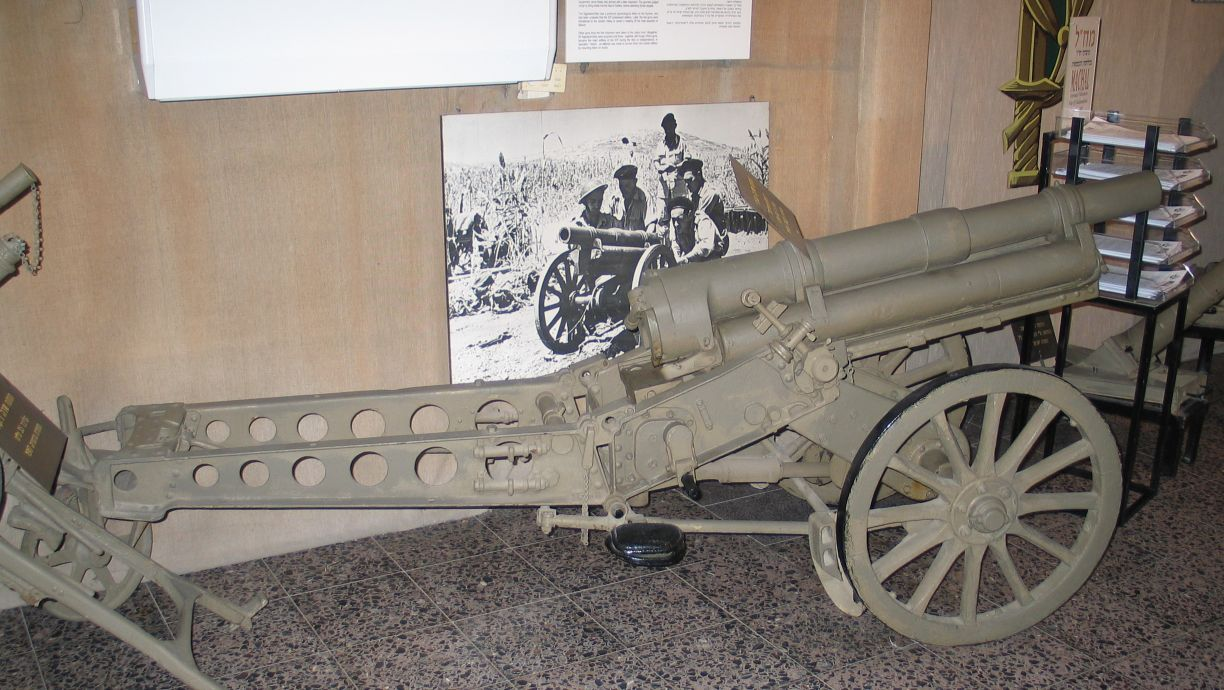

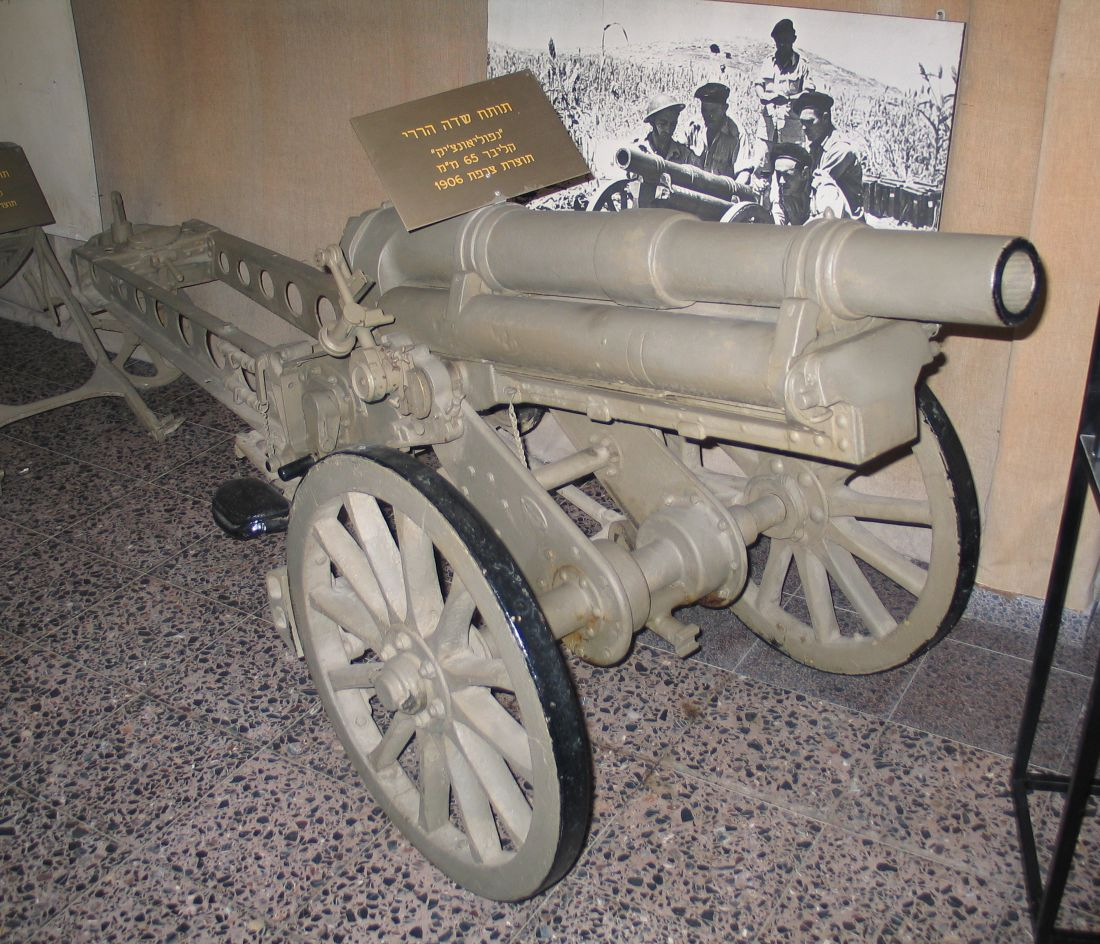

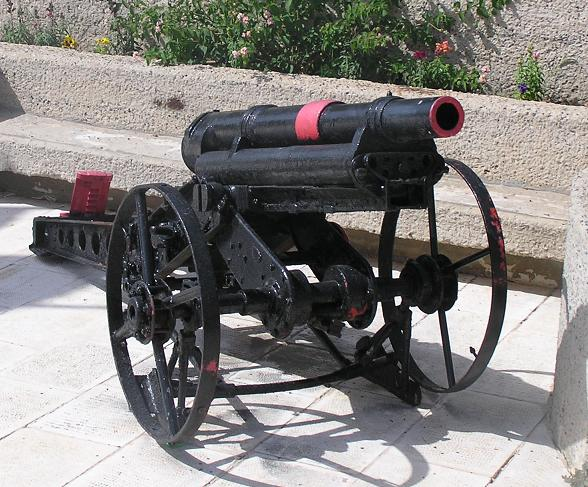

== See also ==
=== Weapons of comparable role, performance and era ===
- BL 10-pounder Mountain Gun approximate British equivalent
- QF 2.95-inch Mountain Gun approximate British equivalent firing slightly larger shell
