= RML 2.5-inch mountain gun =

Ordnance RML 2.5-inch mountain gun
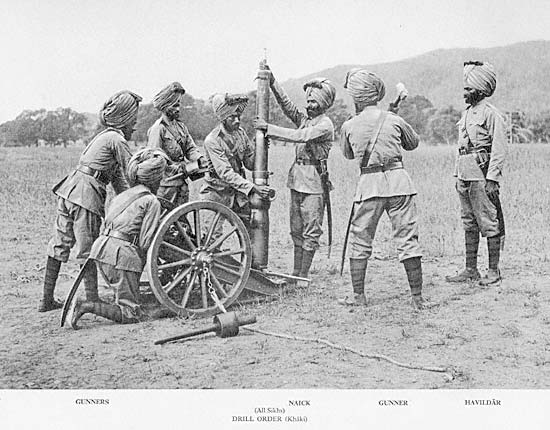
- Sikh gunners assembling the gun, circa. 1895
- Type: Mountain gun
- Place of origin: United Kingdom

Service history
- In service: 1879–1918
- Used by: British Empire; British Raj; Romania
- Wars: Second Boer War; World War I

Production history
- Designer: Colonel le Mesurier, RA
- Designed: 1877
- Manufacturer: Royal Gun Factory

Specifications
- Mass: 800 pounds (363 kg) total
- Length: 69 inches (1,750 mm)
- Barrel length: 66 inches (1,680 mm)
- Shell: 7 pounds 6 ounces (3.35 kg) (Shrapnel); 8 pounds 2 ounces (3.69 kg) (Ring)
- Calibre: 2.5 inches (63.5 mm)
- Action: RML
- Muzzle velocity: 1,436 feet per second (438 m/s)
- Maximum firing range: 3,300 yards (3,018 m) (shrapnel); 4,000 yards (3,658 m) (ring)

The Ordnance RML 2.5-inch mountain gun was a British rifled muzzle-loading mountain gun of the late 19th century designed to be broken down into four loads for carrying by man or mule. It was primarily used by the Indian Army.

== History ==
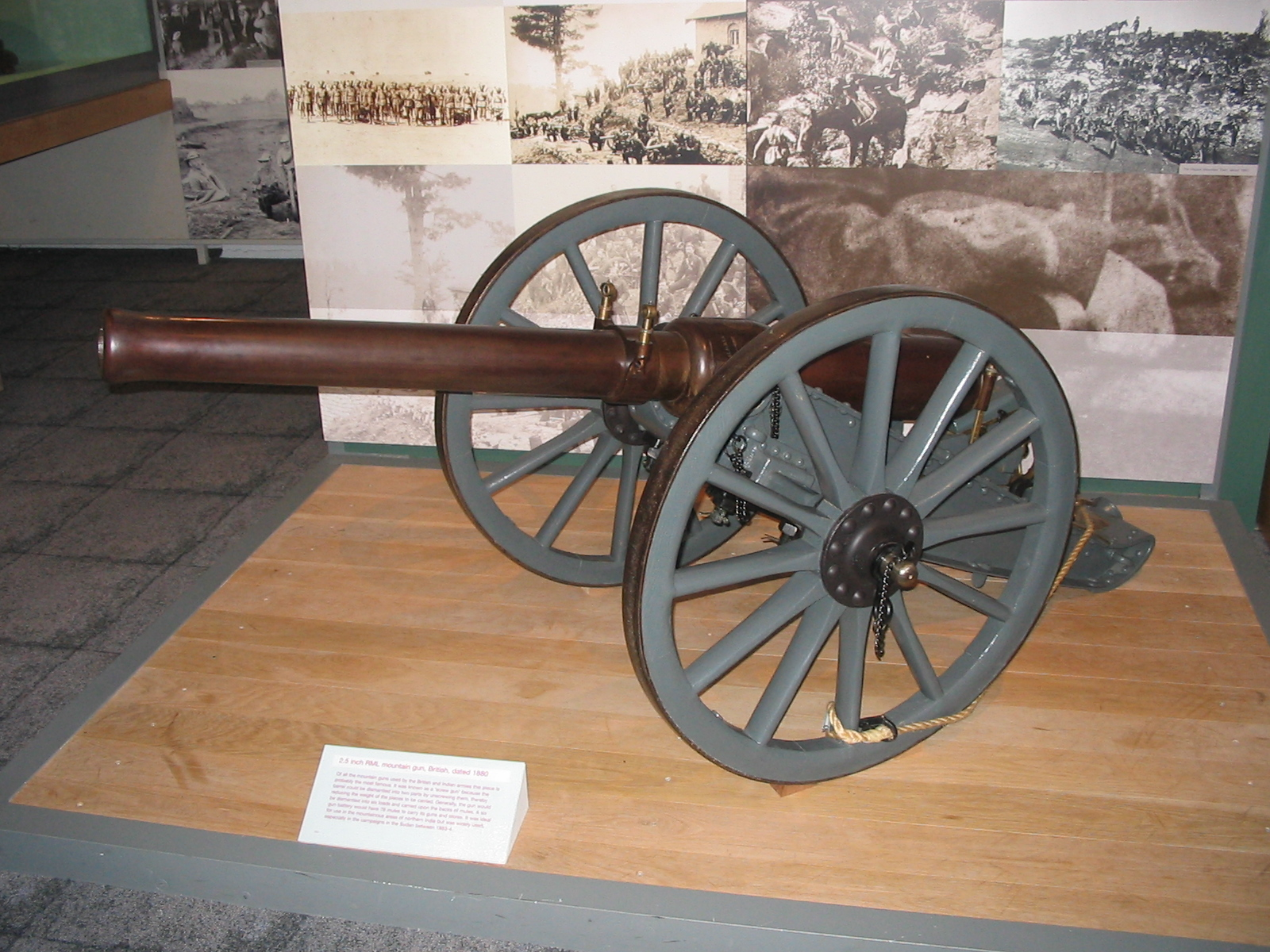
On display at Royal Artillery Museum London.

It was intended as a more powerful successor to the RML 7-pounder mountain gun. Some writers refer to the 2.5-inch gun as a "7-pounder" because it also fired a shell of approximately 7 pounds, but its official nomenclature was 2.5-inch RML.

In 1877 Colonel Frederick Le Mesurier of the Royal Artillery proposed a gun in 2 parts which would be screwed together. The Elswick Ordnance Company made 12 Mk I guns based on his design and they were trialled in Afghanistan in 1879. Trials were successful and Mk II with some internal differences made by the Royal Gun Factory entered service.

The gun was a rifled muzzle-loader. Gun and carriage were designed to be broken down into 4 parts (barrel, breech, 2 wheels) so they could be transported by pack animals (2 mules each: each mule with a left load and a right load, which must balance) or men. The barrel and breech were screwed together for action, hence the name "screw gun".

=== Second Boer War ===
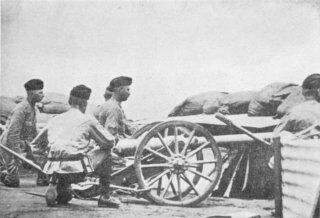
Siege of Kimberley, 1899–1900

The gun was used in the Second Boer War (1899–1902) on its standard mountain gun carriage, and also with the Natal Field Battery at Elandslaagte and Diamond Fields Artillery at Kimberley on field carriages which had larger wheels and gave greater mobility.

A major defect in the war was that the gun's cartridges still used gunpowder as a propellant, although smokeless cordite had been introduced in 1892. The gunpowder generated a white cloud on firing, and as the gun could only be aimed using a direct line of sight, this made the gunners easy targets for Boer marksmen as the gun lacked a shield.

It proved to be ineffectual and outclassed by Boer ordnance and was replaced by the BL 10-pounder mountain gun from 1901.

=== World War I ===
Either 4 or 6 guns (sources appear imprecise) were returned to service from Southern African garrisons in 1916 and were employed by the Nyasaland-Rhodesian Field Force in the campaign in German East Africa. Writers who refer to "7-pounders" in World War I are in fact referring to this 2.5-inch (64 mm) gun.

Romania bought 36 of these guns in 1883–1884, being designated in the local military nomenclature as "63 mm Armstrong mountain guns model 1883". They were the first guns designed for mountain warfare in Romanian use. Despite being obsolete, they were still used during World War I, with updated shells, due to the lack of sufficient numbers of more modern mountain guns in Romanian Army service as well as the fact that during the 1916-1917 campaigns a large section of the front was in mountainous terrain. By the beginning of 1918, only 16 remained in service

== Surviving examples ==
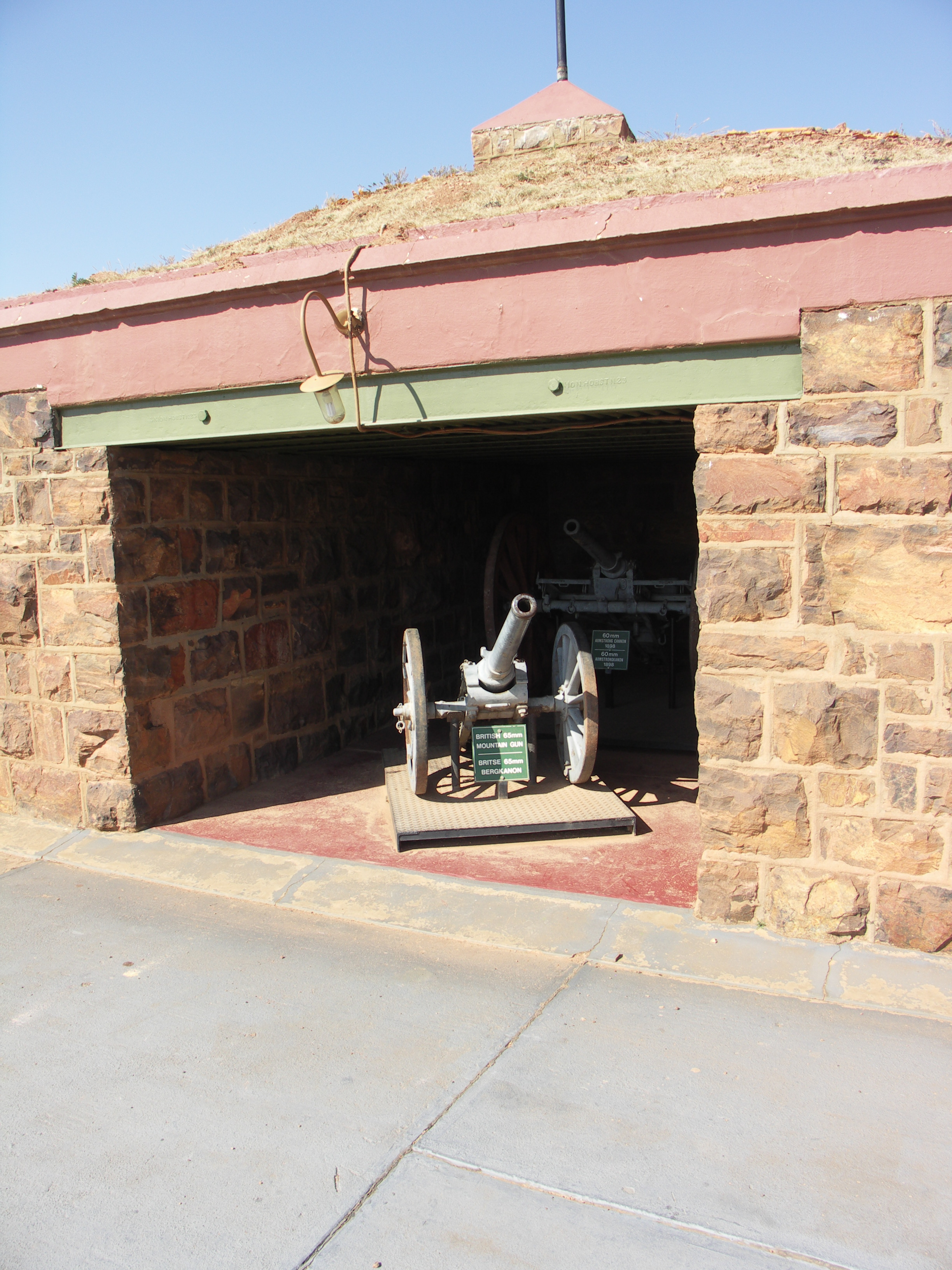
At Fort Klapperkop, Pretoria

- The restored gun is displayed at Firepower, the Royal Artillery Museum. Woolwich London
- Two guns are displayed at Fort Charles, Port Royal, Jamaica
- Two 2.5-inch (64 mm) RMLs on Field carriages and one on a Mountain carriage, at Fort Klapperkop Military Museum, Pretoria, South Africa.
- One gun at the National Military Museum, Romania, Bucharest
- Two guns guarding Avram Iancu's tomb in Țebea, Romania
- Two guns displayed outside Peleș Castle, Romania

== In literature ==
- It was actively described in Rudyard Kipling's poem "Screw-Guns".

== See also ==
- List of mountain artillery

== Bibliography ==
- General Sir Martin Farndale, "History of the Royal Regiment of Artillery. The Forgotten Fronts and the Home Base, 1914-18". London : The Royal Artillery Institution, 1988 ISBN 1-870114-05-1
- Major Darrell D Hall, "Guns in South Africa 1899-1902" in The South African Military History Society Military History Journal – Vol 2 No 1, June 1971
- W. L. Ruffell, The Screw Gun
