= BL 2.75-inch mountain gun =

Ordnance BL 2.75 inch mountain gun
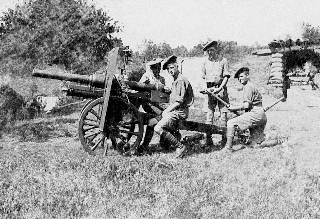
- Men of the 4th (Highland) Mountain Brigade with 2.75 inches (70 mm) mountain gun, Kamberli, Salonika front, June 1918.
- Type: Mountain artillery
- Place of origin: United Kingdom

Service history
- In service: 1914–1919
- Used by: United Kingdom of Great Britain and Ireland; British Raj
- Wars: World War I

Production history
- Designed: 1911
- No. built: 183

Specifications
- Mass: 586 kg (1,292 lb)
- Barrel length: 72.5 inch (1.84 m)
- Shell: BL (bagged charge)
- Shell weight: 5.67 kg (12.5 lb)
- Caliber: 2.75 inches 69.85 mm
- Breech: Interrupted screw
- Recoil: Hydro-spring, constant, 38 in (970 mm)
- Carriage: Two wheeled, pole trail
- Elevation: -15° + 22°
- Traverse: 4° L & R
- Muzzle velocity: 1,290 ft/s (393 m/s)
- Maximum firing range: 5,600 yd (5,100 m) Shrapnel; 5,800 yd (5,300 m) HE

The Ordnance BL 2.75-inch mountain gun was a screw gun designed for and used by the Indian Mountain Artillery into World War I.

== Description ==
The gun was an improved version of the 1901 BL 10-pounder mountain gun.

The new 1911 version improved on the 1901 gun with a new pole trail, recoil buffer, recuperator and gun shield, and increased shell weight from 10 to 12.5 lb (5.7 kg). It was a screw gun design, where the barrel could be separated into two parts via a screw joint. This allowed for the gun to have a heavier barrel, but still be broken into smaller portions for transport by mule teams. This was important for a weapon designed to be used in mountainous and rough terrain, or where adequate vehicle and horse transport was not readily available. The weapon could be carried by six mules or towed.

== Service history ==
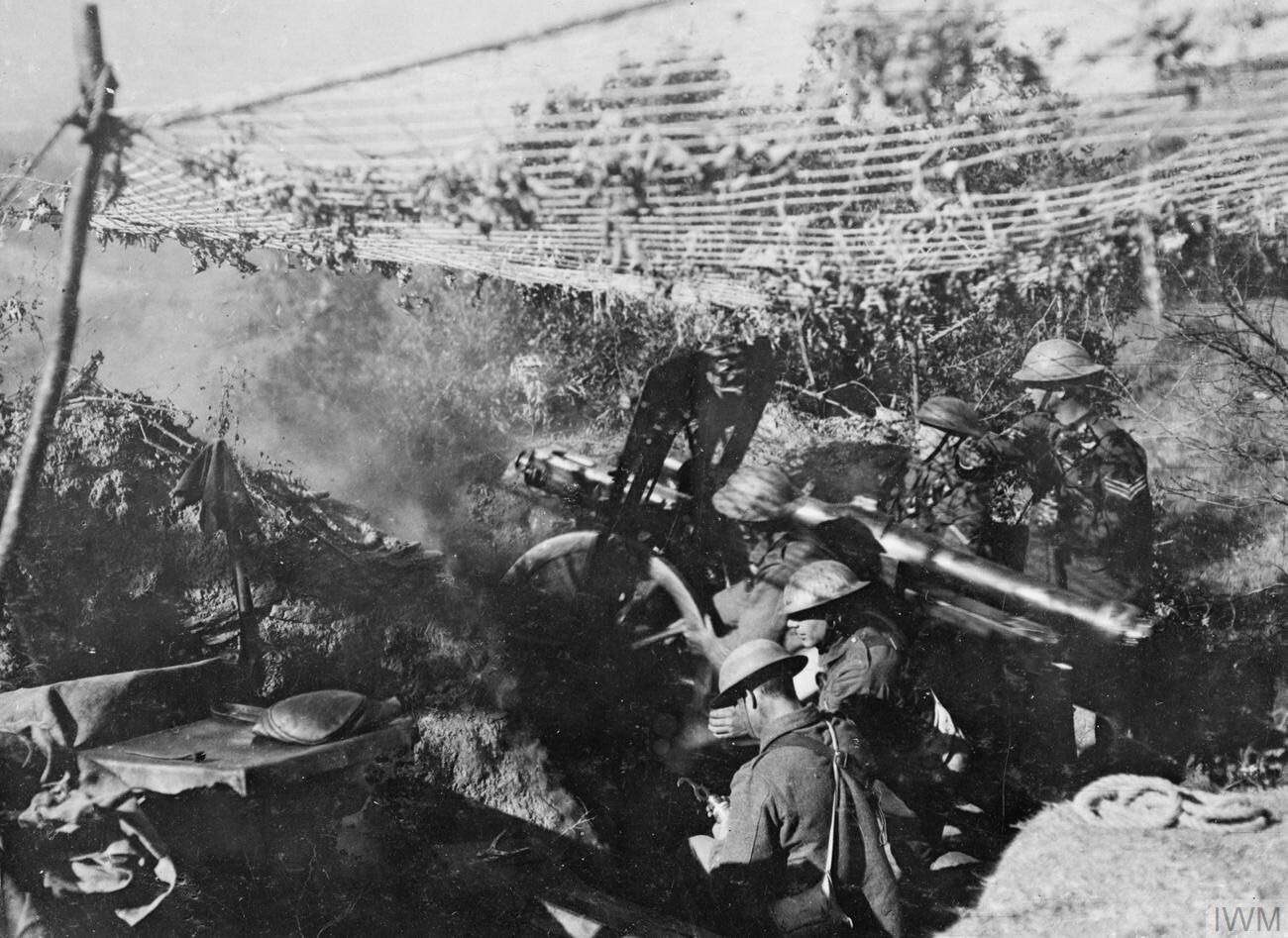
Firing on the Doiran front, Salonika 1917

The gun was adopted in 1911 and began entering service in 1914.

The weapon served primarily with the Indian Mountain Artillery in the northwest portion of British Indian territory (on what is now the border between Pakistan and Afghanistan) and participated in British-led military action in that theatre.

It also served in Mesopotamia and the Salonika front during World War I.

Due to its specialised nature the gun was produced in only limited numbers, with just 183 manufactured during the war.

It was superseded at the end of World War I by the QF 3.7-inch mountain howitzer.

== Ammunition ==
Cordite cartridge	Mk I Shrapnel shell	No. 80 fuze	T friction tube

== Surviving examples ==
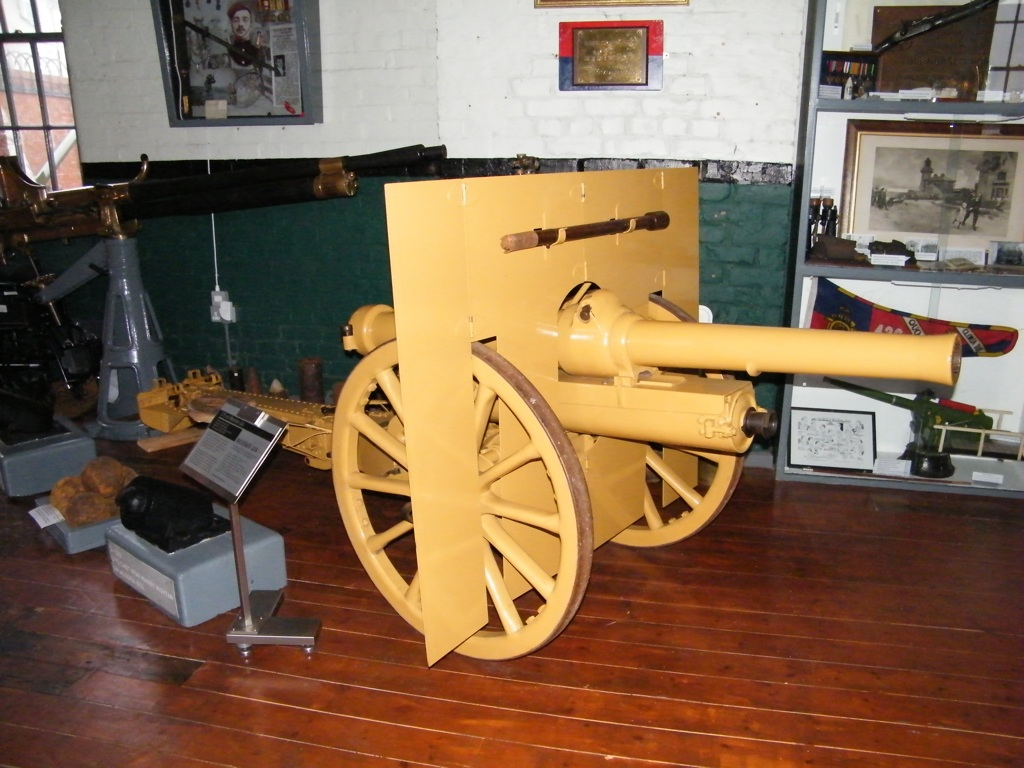
2.75-inch mountain gun on display at the Heugh Battery

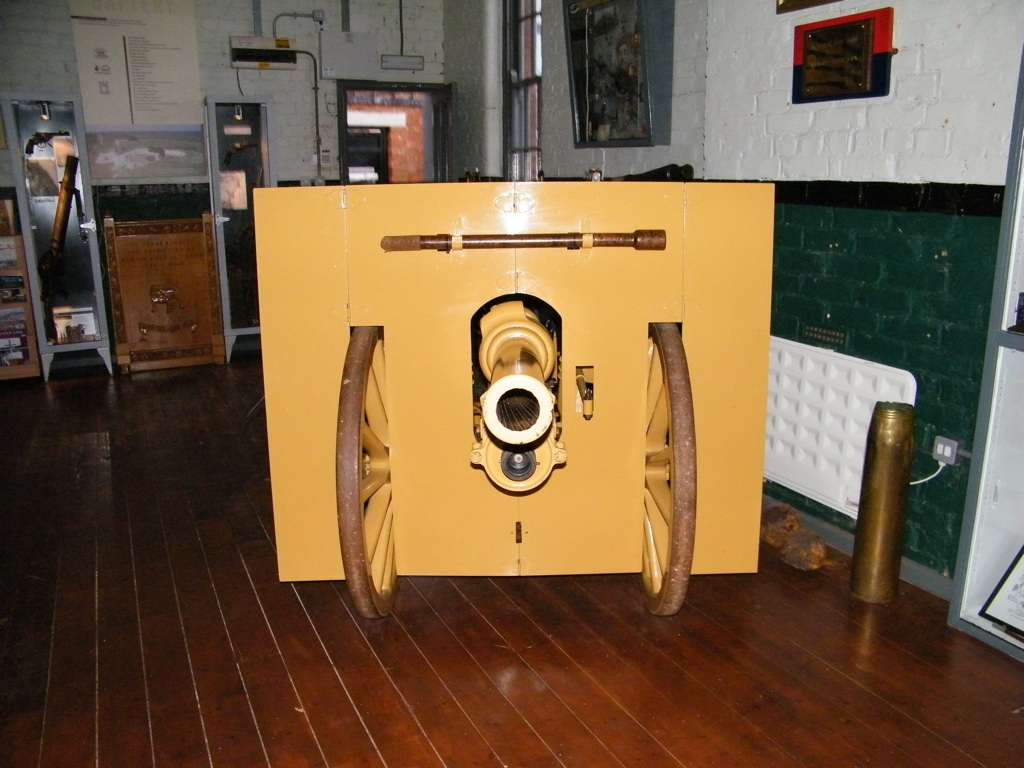
Front view

A 2.75-inch mountain gun is on display at the Heugh Battery Museum, Hartlepool

== See also ==
- List of mountain artillery

== Bibliography ==
- Dale Clarke, British Artillery 1914-1919. Field Army Artillery. Osprey Publishing, Oxford UK, 2004 ISBN 1-84176-688-7
- Hogg, Ian; 2000; Twentieth Century Artillery; Amber Books, Ltd., ISBN 1-58663-299-X
- I.V. Hogg & L.F. Thurston, British Artillery Weapons & Ammunition. London: Ian Allan, 1972
