= BL 10-pounder mountain gun =

Ordnance BL 10-pounder mountain gun
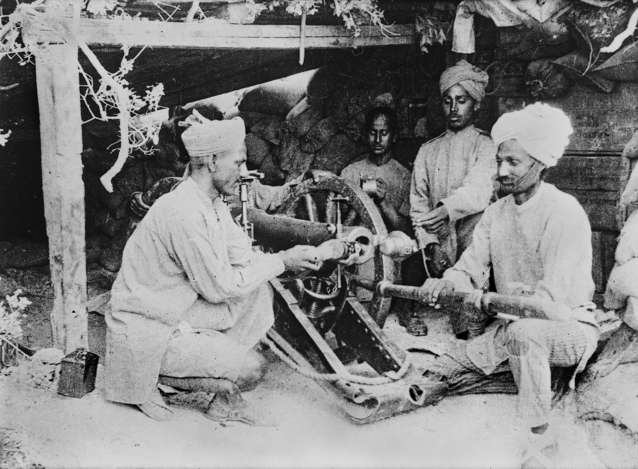
- Indian Army 10 pounder mountain gun and crew, Gallipoli, 1915
- Type: Mountain gun
- Place of origin: United Kingdom

Service history
- In service: 1901–1918
- Used by: United Kingdom of Great Britain and Ireland; British Raj
- Wars: World War I

Production history
- Manufacturer: Woolwich Arsenal, Elswick Ordnance Company (UK)
- Variants: MK I

Specifications
- Mass: Breech: 207 lb (93.9 kg); Barrel: 197 lb (89.36 kg); Total: 874 lb (396.4 kg)
- Barrel length: Bore: 72.4 in (1.8 m); Total: 76.4 in (1.9 m)
- Shell: Shrapnel, Common shell 10 pounds (4.54 kg)
- Calibre: 2.75 inches (69.8 mm)
- Action: Breech Loading with separate shell and charge
- Recoil: None
- Carriage: Wheeled, box trail
- Elevation: -15° – 25°
- Traverse: 0°
- Muzzle velocity: 1,289 ft/s (393 m/s)
- Effective firing range: 3,700 yards (3,383 m) (Time Fuze); 6,000 yards (5,486 m) (Percussion fuze)

The Ordnance BL 10 pounder mountain gun was developed as a BL successor to the RML 2.5 inch screw gun which was outclassed in the Second Boer War.

== History ==
This breech-loading gun was an improvement on the 2.5 inches (63.5 mm) muzzle-loading screw gun but still lacked any recoil absorber or recuperator mechanism. It could be dismantled into 4 loads of approximately 200 pounds (90.7 kg) for transport, typically by mule.

It was originally manufactured without a Gun shield, but these were made and fitted locally during World War I, at Nairobi in 1914 for the East Africa campaign, and at Suez in 1915 for the Gallipoli campaign.

It was eventually replaced by the BL 2.75 inch Mountain Gun from 1914 onwards but was still the main mountain gun in service when World War I began.

== Combat service ==
British mountain guns were operated by men of the Royal Garrison Artillery.

=== World War I ===
Guns of the 26th Mountain Battery of the Indian Army were the first British Empire artillery to open fire in the Middle East in World War I, on 26 January 1915, Qantara (Kantara), against the Turkish advance towards the Suez Canal.

The gun was used notably in the Gallipoli Campaign in 1915 by two Indian Army units, the 21st (Kohat) Mountain Battery (Frontier Force) and 26th (Jacobs) Mountain Battery of the 7th Indian Mountain Brigade with 6 guns each at Anzac, and by the Scottish Territorial Force unit, the 4th Highland (Mountain) Brigade, Royal Garrison Artillery (Argyllshire and Ross & Cromarty Batteries with 4 guns each) at Helles and then Suvla. The 21st Battery was granted the title "Royal" in 1922 for its actions including Gallipoli, unique for an artillery battery.

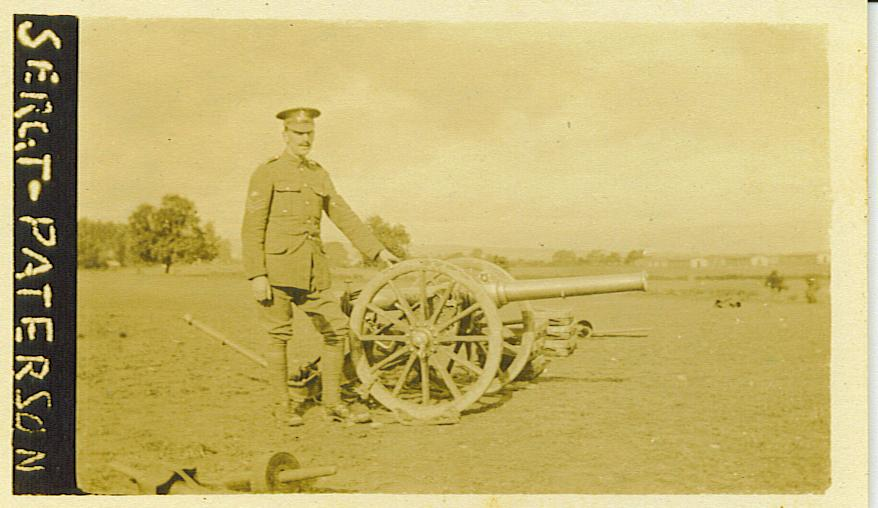
Sgt Paterson, 4th Highland (Mountain) Brigade, circa. 1915.

There is some evidence that the Turkish defenders on Gallipoli were also using the 10 pounder, bought prewar from New Zealand, as the ANZACs discovered 10 pounder shell bodies fired at them made in India which were not from their own guns.

In the East Africa campaign, the following Indian batteries used the 10 pounder with distinction in constant action :-

- 27th Mountain Battery (6 guns), part of the Indian Expeditionary Force C, from 27 August 1914 to 2 January 1918.
- 28th Mountain Battery with 6 guns arrived with Indian Expeditionary Force B from 30 October 1914, returned to India December 1916. 28th Battery's first engagement occurred with the guns tied to the deck of HM Transport ship Bharata, firing in support of the unsuccessful British attempt to capture Tanga on 3 & 4 November 1914. Gunner Mehr Khan was awarded the Indian Distinguished Service Medal and Subadar-Major Nur Allam was awarded the Order of British India for their actions in 28th Battery defending Jasin on 18 January 1915.
- 1st Kashmir (4 guns) arrived 5 December 1916, returned to India 2 February 1918. Between them the 1st and 27th were awarded 2 Order Of British India, 1 Indian Distinguished Service Medal, 7 Meritorious Service Medals, 12 Mentioned in Despatches.
- 24th Hazara Mountain Battery (Frontier Force) served in East Africa from 26 April 1917, taking up the 6 guns left by 28th Battery. A typical extract from their War Diary reads : "Ndundwala 2nd July 1917... one section came into action and fired 87 rounds shrapnel at enemy holding river crossing place at range 750 yards. Forward observer reported three direct hits on his breastworks. Sniping continued" 19 August 1917 : "constructed an emplacement within 150 yards of enemy... tubes which were dated 1901 are very bad and several misfires occurred... during last 15 days fired 548 shrapnel, 35 common and 4 star shells at average range of 1,000 yards". They returned to India in November 1918.
- 22nd (Derajat) Mountain Battery (Frontier Force) arrived in the East Africa campaign on 18 December 1916, when they relieved the 28th Battery which returned to India. They appear to have initially used 10 pounders and re-equipped with 3.7 inches (94.0 mm) howitzers some time later, as Farndale reports they first used their 3.7 inches (94.0 mm) howitzers in action in the attack on German positions at Medo, 11 April 1918. They returned to India in November 1918.

The gun was also used in the Palestine campaign.

== See also ==
- List of mountain artillery

=== Weapons of comparable role, performance and era ===
- Canon de 65 M (montagne) modele 1906 approximate French equivalent

== Surviving examples ==
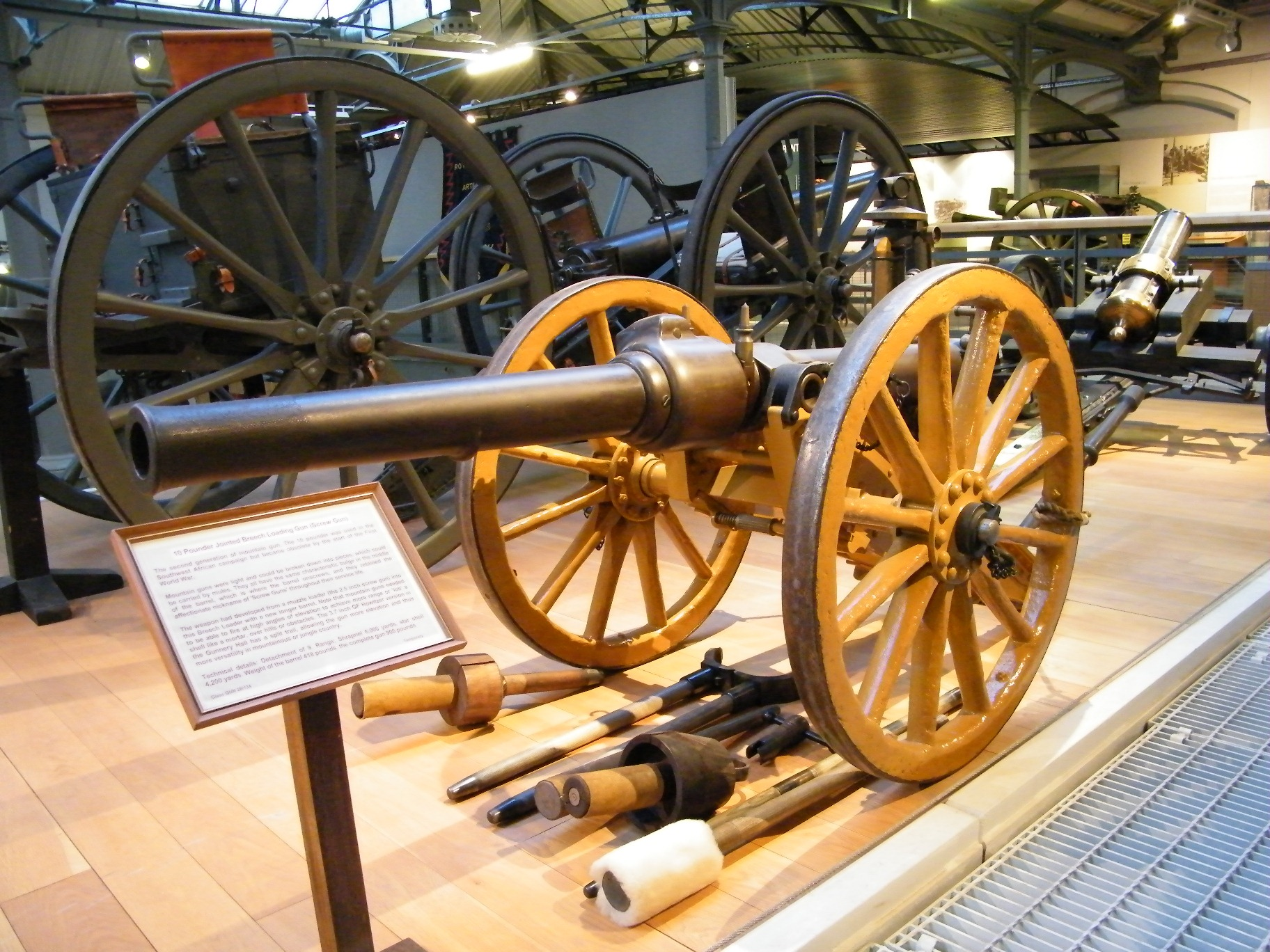
10 Pounder Mountain Gun on display at the Royal Artillery Museum

- A restored gun is on display at the Royal Artillery Museum, Woolwich, London

== Bibliography ==
- Dale Clarke, British Artillery 1914–1919. Field Army Artillery. Osprey Publishing, Oxford UK, 2004 ISBN 1-84176-688-7
- General Sir Martin Farndale, "History of the Royal Regiment of Artillery. The Forgotten Fronts and the Home Base, 1914–18". London : The Royal Artillery Institution, 1988. ISBN 1-870114-05-1
- I.V. Hogg & L.F. Thurston, British Artillery Weapons & Ammunition 1914–1918. London:Ian Allan, 1972. ISBN 978-0-7110-0381-1
- 1970s Command Magazine SCREW GUN article with rare photos and art work
