= RML 9-pounder 8 and 6 cwt guns =

RML 9-pounder 8 cwt gun
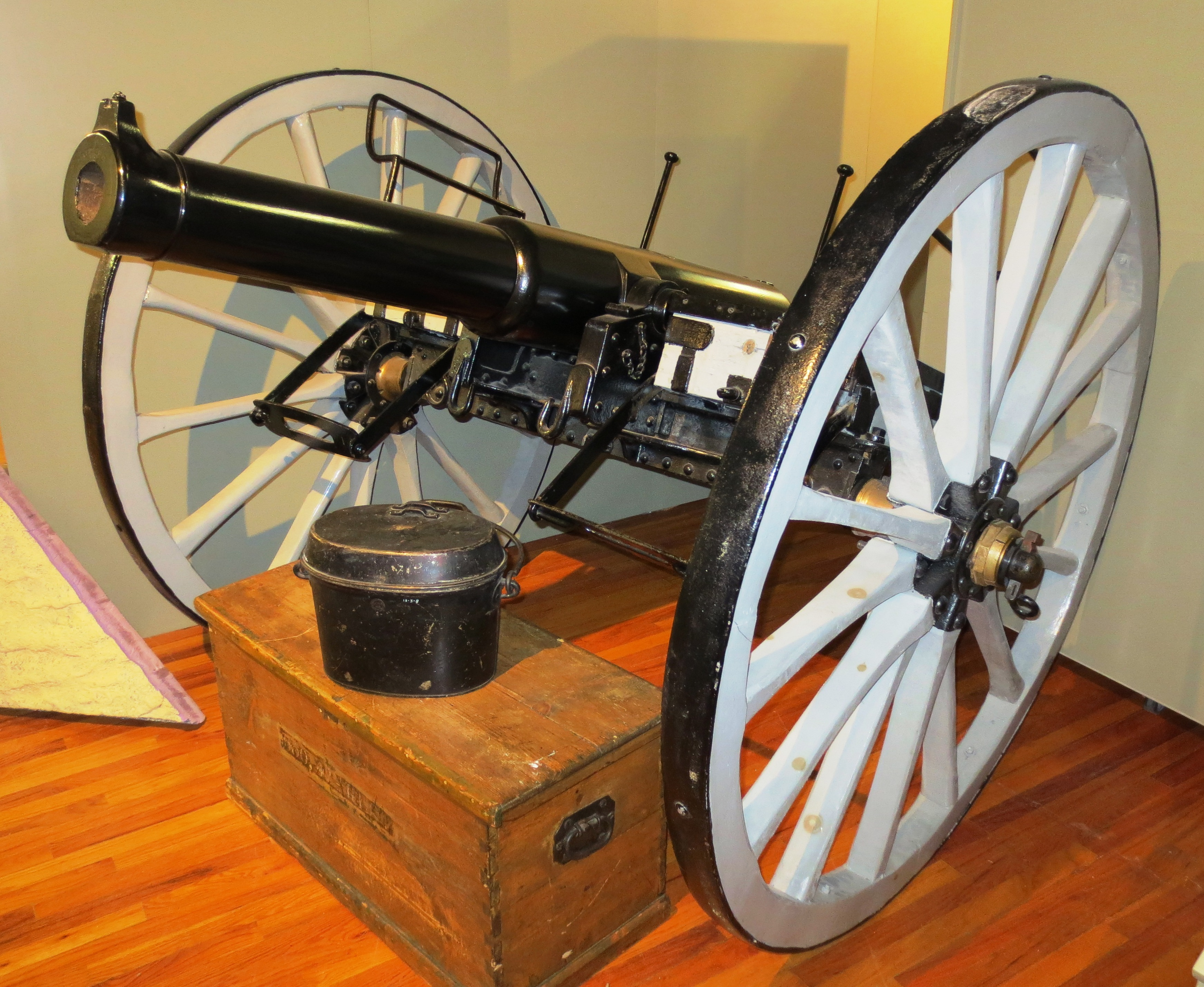
- RML 9-pounder 8 cwt Field Gun, at CFB Gagetown, New Brunswick.
- Type: Field gun
- Place of origin: United Kingdom

Service history
- In service: 1871–1895
- Used by: British Empire; Sultanate of Zanzibar

Production history
- Designer: Woolwich Arsenal
- Manufacturer: Woolwich Arsenal
- Variants: 9 pdr 8 cwt Mark I (Land Service); 8 cwt Mark II (Naval Service); 6 cwt Mark I (N.S.); 6 cwt Mark II (L.S.); 6 cwt. Mark III (N.S.); 6 cwt Mark IV (N.S.)

Specifications
- Mass: 8-long-hundredweight (400 kg) or 6-long-hundredweight (300 kg)
- Length: including limber 20 ft 5.5 in (6.236 m) (Mk I); 20 ft 7.5 in (6.287 m) (Mk II)
- Width: 5 ft 2 in (1.57 m)
- Height: 5 ft (1.5 m)
- Shell: 9.1 pounds (4.1 kg) (common shell); 9.8 pounds (4.4 kg) (shrapnel)
- Calibre: 3 in (76 mm)
- Action: RML
- Breech: none – muzzle-loading
- Muzzle velocity: 1,330 feet per second (405 m/s)
- Effective firing range: 3,500 yards (3,200 m)

The RML 9-pounder 8 cwt gun and the RML 9-pounder 6 cwt gun were British Rifled, Muzzle Loading (RML) field, horse and naval artillery guns manufactured in England in the 19th century. They fired a projectile weighing approximately 9 pounds (4.1 kg). "8 cwt" and "6 cwt" refers to the weight of the gun to differentiate it from other 9-pounder guns.

== Service history ==
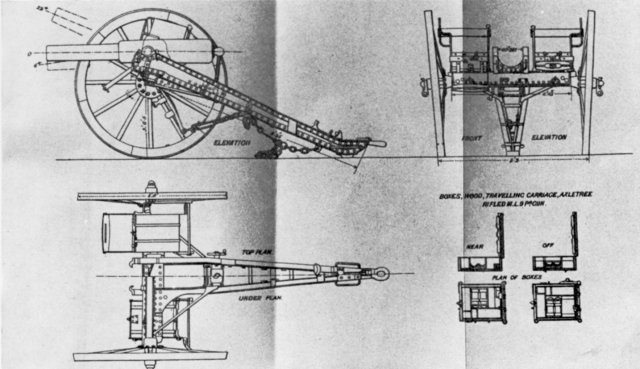
An 1871 diagram showing the gun and carriage of the RML 9-pounder 8 cwt field gun.

The 9-pounder 8 cwt Rifled Muzzle Loader was the field gun selected by the Royal Artillery in 1871 to replace the more sophisticated RBL 12 pounder 8 cwt Armstrong gun, which had acquired a reputation for unreliability. The gun was rifled using the system developed by William Palliser, in which studs protruding from the side of the shell engaged with three spiral grooves in the barrel. In 1874, a 6 cwt version was introduced for horse artillery and was later adopted for field artillery use, replacing the 8 cwt version. All variants used the same ammunition, which took the form of shrapnel shell, case shot and common shell.

The 9-pounder remained in front-line service with the Royal Artillery until 1878 when the RML 13 pounder 8 cwt gun was introduced. It remained in use with colonial forces until 1895 and saw action in the Anglo-Zulu War of 1879, the First Boer War of 1881 and the Anglo-Egyptian War in 1882. A number were issued to British Artillery Volunteer units, with the 1st Ayrshire and Galloway Artillery Volunteers being issued with some guns as late as 1901.

== Variants ==
- 9-pounder 8 cwt Mark I (Land Service): Introduced into the Royal Artillery in 1871. It was later withdrawn and modified for sea service.
- 9-pounder 8 cwt Mark II (Naval Service): Introduced in 1873 by the Royal Navy.
- 9-pounder 6 cwt Mark I (N.S.): A few were made for experimental trials but they proved to be too short; some were issued to the Royal Indian Navy. In 1873, forty five were completed for use as boat guns.
- 9-pounder 6 cwt Mark II (L.S.): A new design in 1874 for the Royal Horse Artillery, it was longer than the 8 cwt gun but had the same carriage.
- 9-pounder 6 cwt Mark III (N.S.): Introduced in 1879, a modified Mark II for naval service.
- 9-pounder 6 cwt Mark IV (N.S.): Similar to the Mark III with a steel jacket instead of wrought iron previously used, and with a strengthened cascabel.

== Surviving examples ==
- Royal Artillery Museum (the collection is currently in storage awaiting relocation to a new site)
- Fort Nelson, Hampshire, Royal Armouries Collection
- Southsea Castle, Hampshire, England
- North Battleford Museum, Saskatchewan
- CFB Petawawa, Ontario
- New Brunswick Military History Museum, CFB Gagetown, New Brunswick
- Fort Hughes (New Brunswick), New Brunswick
- Royal Kennebecasis Yacht Club, New Brunswick
- Fort Anne, Nova Scotia
- Fort St Catherine, Bermuda
- Australian Army Artillery Museum, Manly, New South Wales
- Fort Lytton Military Museum, Brisbane, Queensland, Australia – gun and ammunition
- Notre-Dame-des-Neiges cemetery, Montréal
- Telangana State Archaeology Museum, Hyderabad, India

== See also ==
- List of field guns
