= RML 13-pounder 8 cwt =

RML 13-pounder 8 cwt gun
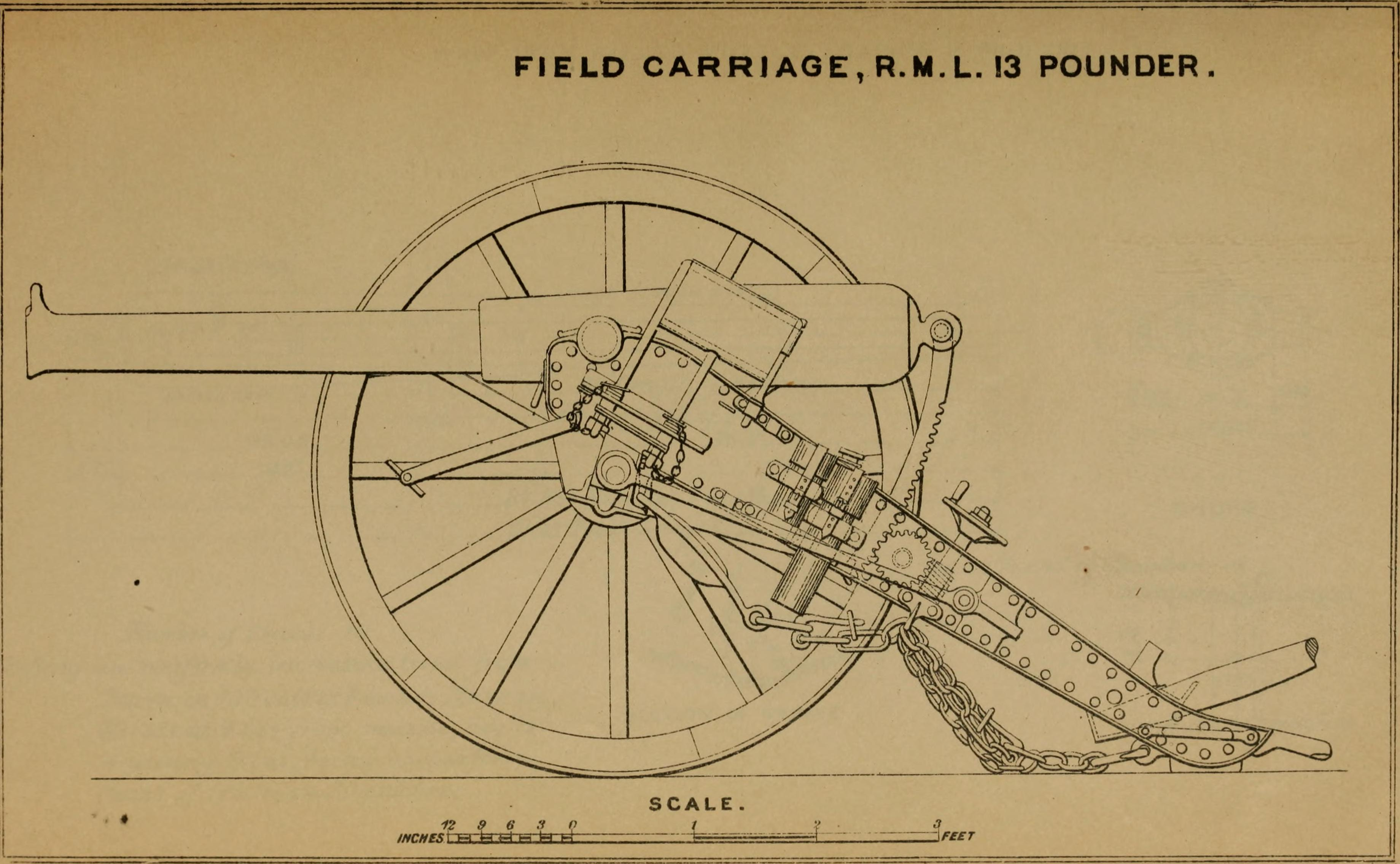
- RML 13-pounder 8 cwt Field Gun diagram, 1882
- Type: Field gun
- Place of origin: United Kingdom

Service history
- In service: 1879–1902
- Used by: British Empire
- Wars: Anglo-Egyptian War

Production history
- Designer: Woolwich Arsenal
- Manufacturer: Woolwich Arsenal
- Produced: 1879–1902
- Variants: 13 pdr 8 cwt Mark I and II (Land Service) only

Specifications
- Mass: 8-long-hundredweight (400 kg)
- Length: 7 ft 3 ins
- Crew: 9
- Shell weight: 13 pounds (5.9 kg) (common shell); 13 pounds (5.9 kg) (shrapnel)
- Calibre: 3 inches
- Action: RML
- Breech: none – muzzle-loading
- Carriage: Horse drawn
- Rate of fire: One round per minute
- Muzzle velocity: 1,330 feet per second (405 m/s)
- Effective firing range: 3,500 yards (3,200 m)
- Sights: Centre sighted

The RML 13-pounder 8 cwt gun was a British Rifled, Muzzle Loading (RML) field artillery gun manufactured in England in the 19th century, which fired a projectile weighing approximately 13 pounds (5.9 kg). "8 cwt" refers to the weight of the gun.

== Design and manufacture ==
The 13-pounder was the last Rifled Muzzle Loading field gun to be produced, with production starting in 1879. Unlike the 9 and 16 Pounder RML guns, the 13-pounder had a much greater muzzle length. They could be finished as muzzle loaders or breech loaders, however they were all ordered to be finished as muzzle loaders. Their construction consisted of an 'A' tube of toughened steel, over which was shrunk a 'B' tube of wrought iron. The gun was rifled using a polygroove system, comprising 10 grooves on the Maitland system.

The gun was fitted with a set of sights on the centre of the barrel. This enabled the gun to be sighted for indirect, or direct fire. A flat surface was machined on top of the barrel for a clinometer to be used, enabling the gun to be levelled, or to provide an alternate method of indirect sighting.

== Operation ==
The 13-pounder was normally deployed in batteries of six or four guns. Each gun was pulled by a team of six horses. It had a crew of nine men – five crew who could be mounted on seats on the limber and gun, three drivers and a gun commander (number one) mounted separately.

In addition to each gun, a limbered ammunition trailer was also horse drawn. When deployed as Field Artillery it was designed to move at the same speed as infantry, or when deployed as Horse Artillery being used where greater speed was required.

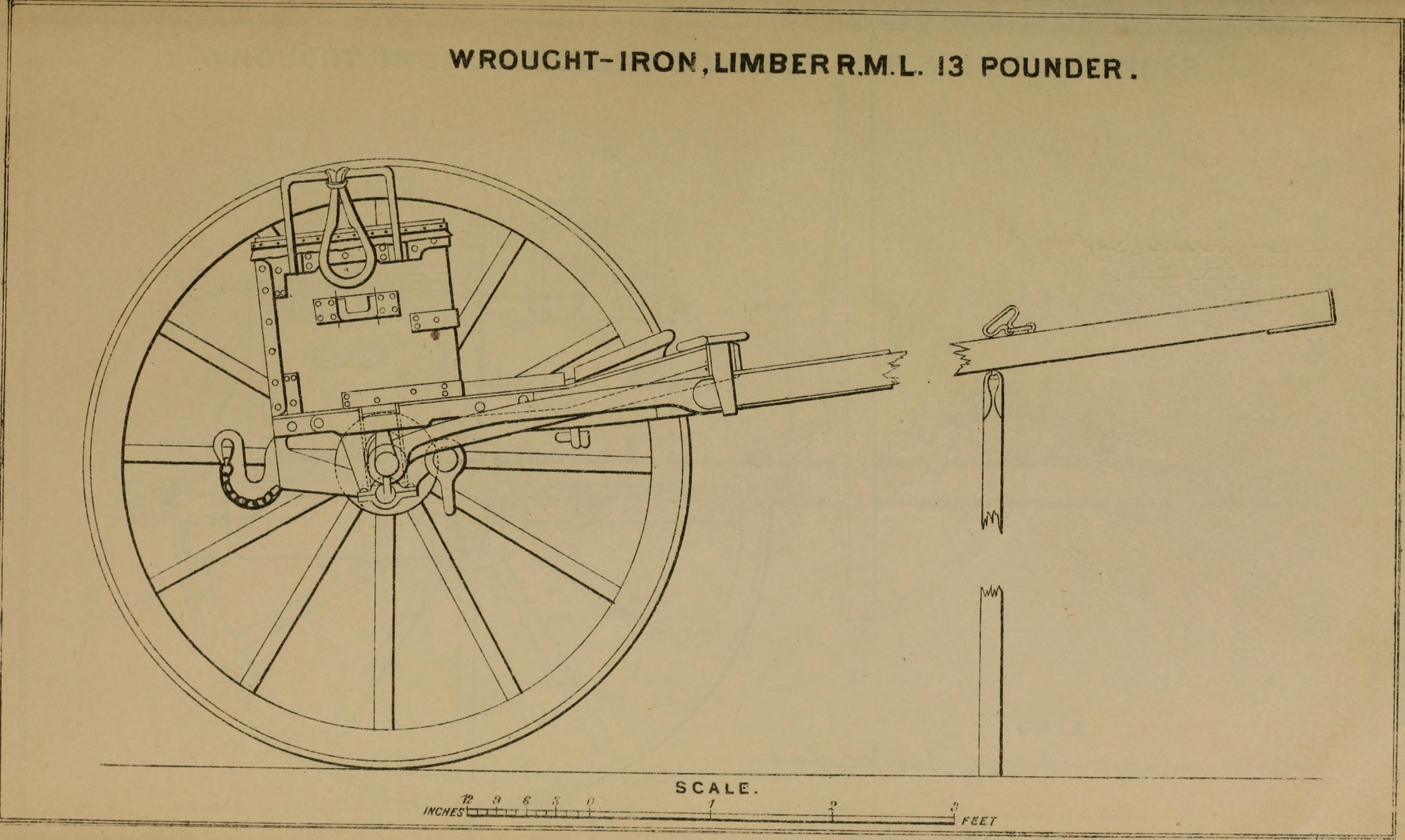
Limber, illustration from the Report of the British naval and military operations in Egypt, 1882 (1883)

Guns were fired using a silk bag containing a black powder propellant. They used three types of ammunition – Common shell (for use against buildings or fortifications), shrapnel shell (for use against infantry or cavalry) and case shot (for close range use against 'soft' targets.) Ignition was through a copper-lined vent at the breech end of the gun. A copper friction tube would be inserted and a lanyard attached. When the lanyard was pulled the tube would ignite, firing the gun. A number of different fuzes could be used enabling shells to either burst at a pre-determined time (and range), or on impact. A typical rate of fire was one round per minute.

== Service history ==
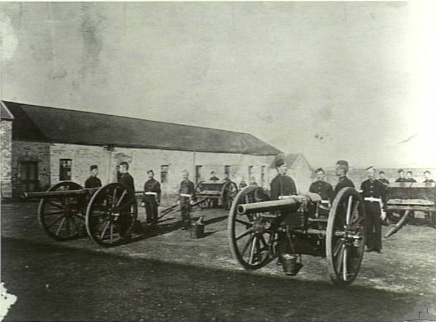
The Southern Tasmania Volunteer Artillery at drill with RML 13-pounders in Hobart, 1890.

The 13-pounder saw action in the Anglo-Egyptian War of 1882, where four Batteries were deployed, two with the Royal Horse Artillery and two as Field Artillery. It remained in front-line service with the Royal Artillery until the late 1880s when replaced by the 15 pounder Breech-Loading gun.

Some were re-issued to the 3rd Middlesex Artillery Volunteers as Batteries of Position from 1889 and some remained in use until around 1902, when they were succeeded by more modern breech loading guns. In 1896 three guns were held by the South Australian Volunteer Artillery.

== Surviving examples ==
A surviving example with carriage is displayed at Fort Rodd Hill, British Columbia. Another example in Canada, and the only one located in a building, is located at the Bay Street Armoury, the museum of 5th (British Columbia) Field Artillery Regiment.

Another two surviving examples are on the Armed Forces of Malta's Headquarters barracks parade ground. Formerly on display above the main entrance to the Royal Army Ordnance Corps' HQ in Floriana Malta, they were then taken on charge by the AFM Luqa officers' mess when the RAOC shut up shop in Malta as part of the forces drawdown. Placed on display in Luqa barracks, they slowly deteriorated and were removed in 1994. After more than a decade languishing in the officers' mess kitchen yard, the two were restored by Air Defence Battery personnel in 2005 with the assistance of the curator of "Firepower", the Royal Artillery museum, who provided plans and manuals. When the restoration was finished, the two guns were placed on the Luqa barracks parade ground where they remain to this day.

== See also ==
- List of field guns

== Bibliography ==
- Captain John F Owen R.A., "Treatise on the Construction and Manufacture of Ordnance in the British Service", Prepared in the Royal Gun Factory, London, 1877, pages 177–178, 292.
- Text Book of Gunnery, 1902. LONDON : PRINTED FOR HIS MAJESTY'S STATIONERY OFFICE, BY HARRISON AND SONS, ST. MARTIN'S LANE
