= RBL 12-pounder 8 cwt Armstrong gun =

RBL 12 pounder 8 cwt gun
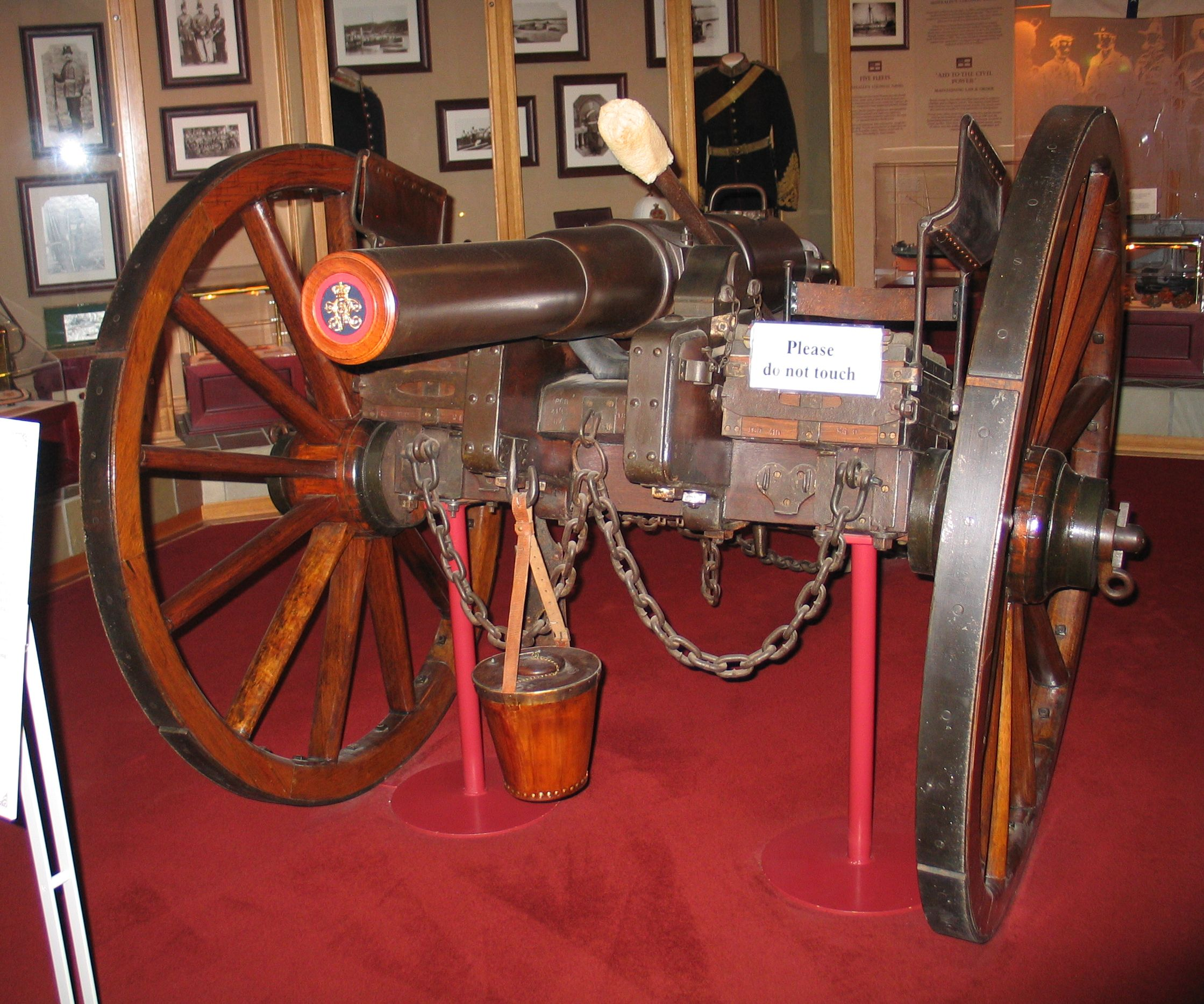
- At the Australian War Memorial, Canberra
- Type: Field gun
- Place of origin: United Kingdom

Service history
- In service: 1859–19??
- Used by: British Empire
- Wars: New Zealand Wars; Second Opium War

Production history
- Designer: W.G. Armstrong Co.
- Manufacturer: Royal Gun Factory
- Unit cost: £79 - £170

Specifications
- Barrel length: First model: total 84-inch, bore 73.375-inch New model: total 72-inch, bore 61.375-inch (20.46 calibres)
- Crew: 9
- Shell: 10 lb 11 oz Shrapnel; 11 lb 4 oz common shell 10 lb 8 oz Segment; 10 lb 9 oz case
- Calibre: 3-inch (76.2 mm)
- Breech: Armstrong screw with vertical sliding vent-piece (block)
- Muzzle velocity: 1,239 feet per second (378 m/s)
- Effective firing range: 3,400 yards (3,100 m)

The Armstrong Breech Loading 12 pounder 8 cwt, later known as RBL 12 pounder 8 cwt, was an early modern 3-inch rifled breech-loading field gun of 1859.

== Design ==
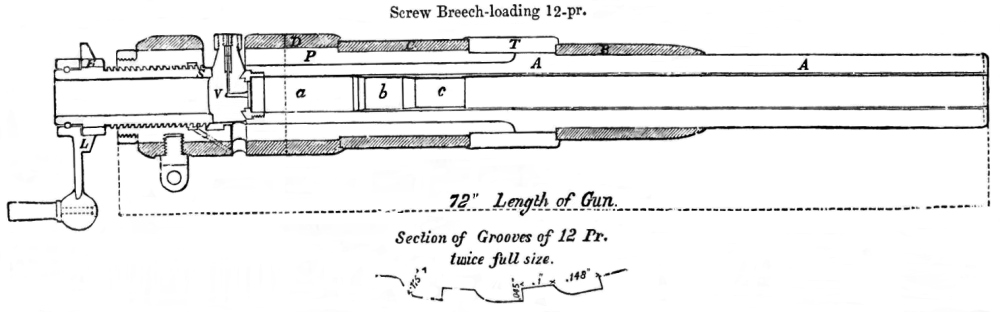
"New pattern" 72-inch barrel and breech

The gun incorporated some advanced features for its day. It was one of the first breech-loaders: shell and gunpowder propellant were loaded through the gunner's end of the barrel, rather than through the muzzle as in previous guns, allowing a higher rate of fire. The shells were coated with lead, which engaged spiral grooves cut inside the barrel ("rifling") and caused the shell to spin rapidly in flight and hence imparted far greater accuracy and range than previous guns. The lead coating effectively sealed the gap between shell and barrel and eliminated the wastage of propellant gases, previously known as "windage", and hence only half the amount of gunpowder propellant as previous was required.

The barrel was of wrought iron, "built up" of a tube with additional layers heated and then shrunk over it as they cooled. The result was a "pre-stressed" barrel: the interior of the barrel was under compression from the layers shrunk over it, so that the heat and pressure of firing did not stretch it. Hence the barrel was smaller and lighter than previous guns.

== United Kingdom service ==
The gun was the British army's first rifled breechloading field gun, superseding the SBML 9 pounder 13 cwt of 1801. The gun as originally adopted had a barrel 84 inches long, with a bore of 73.375 inches. The Royal Navy adopted a version with a 72-inch barrel, with a bore of 61.375 inches, by simply cutting 12 inches off the end, and from 1863 the shorter length was incorporated into a common version for both land and sea use.

The new technology involved required higher standards of gun maintenance and gunner training than the British army was prepared to provide and as a result the gun had a reputation in service for unreliability. In 1871 Britain reverted to muzzle-loading guns, such as the RML 9 pounder 8 cwt, which were cheaper and fired much cheaper ammunition.

== Colony of Victoria service ==
The Colony of Victoria (today the State of Victoria, in Australia), sold 6 Armstrong 12-pounders to New Zealand for use in the Māori wars, for a sum of 3,592 pounds 1s 8d with equipment and ammunition. They travelled from Melbourne on 7 November 1863 on the troopship Himalaya, and arrived in Auckland on 11 November 1863.

The Victorian Government purchased 6 more guns in 1864 to equip its horse artillery; one of these is restored and displayed at the Australian War Memorial in Canberra. A second restored piece is displayed at the Sunbury War Memorial and another is at the Deniliquin RSL.

== New Zealand Wars ==
"C" Battery, 4th Brigade Royal Artillery, with six guns, served in New Zealand under Captain H.A. Mercer, in March 1861 in the final stages of the First Taranaki War. Captain Mercer again led this battery in the Second Taranaki War until he died leading an unsuccessful attack on a Maori redoubt at Rangiriri in November 1863. In January 1864 "I" battery, equipped with the "new pattern" of 24-calibres, arrived in New Zealand with another six guns. The guns from Victoria were employed from January 1864 onwards to reinforce "C" and "I" batteries. At the end of the war these guns apparently remained in New Zealand where they were used to equip the militia.

== Ammunition ==
Mk III Common shell	Mk I Segment shell

== Surviving examples ==
- Australian War Memorial, Canberra
- Te Awamutu Museum, Te Awamutu, New Zealand
- Royal Artillery Museum, Woolwich, London
- Fort Henry National Historic Site, Kingston Ontario, Canada
- Uruguayan Army Military Museum, Montevideo-Uruguay.

== See also ==
- List of field guns
- Armstrong gun

== Bibliography ==
- Treatise on the construction and manufacture of ordnance in the British service. War Office, UK, 1877
- Text Book of Gunnery, 1902. LONDON: PRINTED FOR HIS MAJESTY'S STATIONERY OFFICE, BY HARRISON AND SONS, ST. MARTIN'S LANE
- W.L. Ruffell, The RBL Armstrong 12-pr Field Gun
- W.L. Ruffell, The Armstrong Gun. Part 5: British revert to Muzzle Loading
- Major Darrell D. Hall, "Field Artillery of the British Army 1860–1960. Part I, 1860 – 1900" in The South African Military History Society. Military History Journal – Vol 2 No 4, December 1972
- Alexander Lyman Holley, "A treatise on Ordnance and Armor" published by D Van Nostrand, New York, 1865
