= Glossary of British ordnance terms =

This article explains terms used for the British Armed Forces' ordnance (weapons) and ammunition. The terms may have different meanings depending on their usage in another country's military.

== BD ==
Between decks: applies to a naval gun mounting in which part of the rotating mass is below the deck, and part of it is above the deck. This allows for a lower profile for a turret, meaning that the turrets need not be superfiring (i.e. they can be mounted on the same deck and not obstruct each other at high angles of elevation).

== BL ==
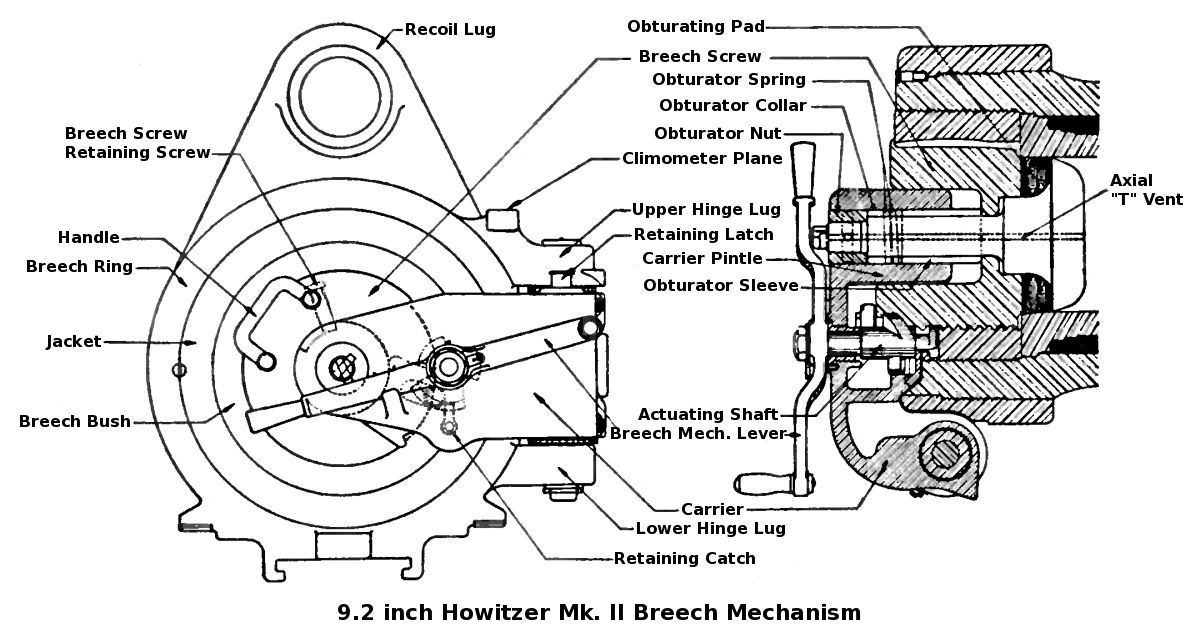
Breech mechanism of BL 9.2-inch howitzer Mk II, showing position of obturating pad at far right

The term BL, in its general sense, stood for breech loading, and contrasted with muzzle loading. The shell was loaded via the breech (i.e. the gunner's end of the barrel, which opened) followed by the propellant charge, and the breech mechanism was closed to seal the chamber.

Breech loading, in its formal British ordnance sense, served to identify the gun as the type of rifled breechloading gun for which the powder charge was loaded in a silk or cloth bag and the breech mechanism was responsible for "obturation" i.e. sealing the chamber to prevent escape of the propellant gases. The term BL was first used to refer to the Armstrong breechloaders, introduced in 1859. Following the discontinuation of Armstrong breechloaders and the period of British rifled muzzle-loaders RML, British breechloaders were re-introduced in 1880. At this point the term rifled breech-loaders RBL was retrospectively introduced to refer to the Armstrong breechloaders, which had a totally different breech mechanism, and since then the term breech-loaders BL has applied exclusively to the type of breechloader introduced from 1880 onwards, using an interrupted-screw breeches.

Early British Elswick breechloaders in the 1880s used a steel "cup" obturation method. This was quickly superseded in guns designed by the Royal Gun Factory by the French de Bange method, the basic principle of which is still in use today. In British service this became a Crossley pad with an interrupted thread screw block e.g. a Welin screw. The shell was loaded via the breech, followed by the propellant charge in a cloth bag. A single-use "vent sealing tube", a type of primer not dissimilar in appearance to a blank rifle round, was inserted into the breech for firing the gun.

While originally, the term "BL" contrasted with "ML", or "muzzleloader" guns, after muzzleloaders were discontinued, the term came to distinguish between traditional, non-obturating guns with fabric propellant bags and separately loaded shells, and quick-firing QF guns which used self-sealing brass cartridge cases, and which usually had the propellant and projectile fixed together as a unit for faster handling and loading. For instance, Britain before World War I had both QF and BL 6-inch (152 mm) guns. Both were "breech loading" in the general sense, but in the formal nomenclature it separated 6-inch (152 mm) guns with breeches designed for charges in brass cartridge cases for quick-firing QF from those designed for cloth bag charges for breech-loaders BL.

Shells designed for one type were not necessarily suitable for use in the other type; for instance, a BL shell relied upon the tight fit of its driving band in the gun bore to prevent it slipping back when the gun was elevated, but a QF shell could rely upon the cartridge case, either fixed or separate, to prevent it slipping back. This presented difficulties for BL guns at high angles. A special cartridge was developed for BL 9.2-inch (234 mm) guns on HA mountings, with provision for a wooden (beech) stick to be inserted through the centre to prevent the shell slipping back on elevation.

Although fixed ammunition allows for a rapid rate of fire in small to medium guns, BL is a better choice for heavy calibre guns; propellant was loaded in a number of small fabric bags, because a single bag holding the full charge would be far too big and bulky for the handlers to lift. Using fabric allows for the charge to be broken into small, easily handled units, while it would be difficult to design a system by which multiple small metallic-cased charges were loaded and fired at the same time. Using multiple small fabric bags also allows the gunners to use a reduced charge if need be.

== BLC ==
The term "BLC" stood for "BL converted" and referred to a breech and breech mechanism modified from an early long-screw three- or four-motion to modern short-screw single-motion. An example is the conversion of the BL 15-pounder to BLC 15-pounder.

== C.R.H. ==
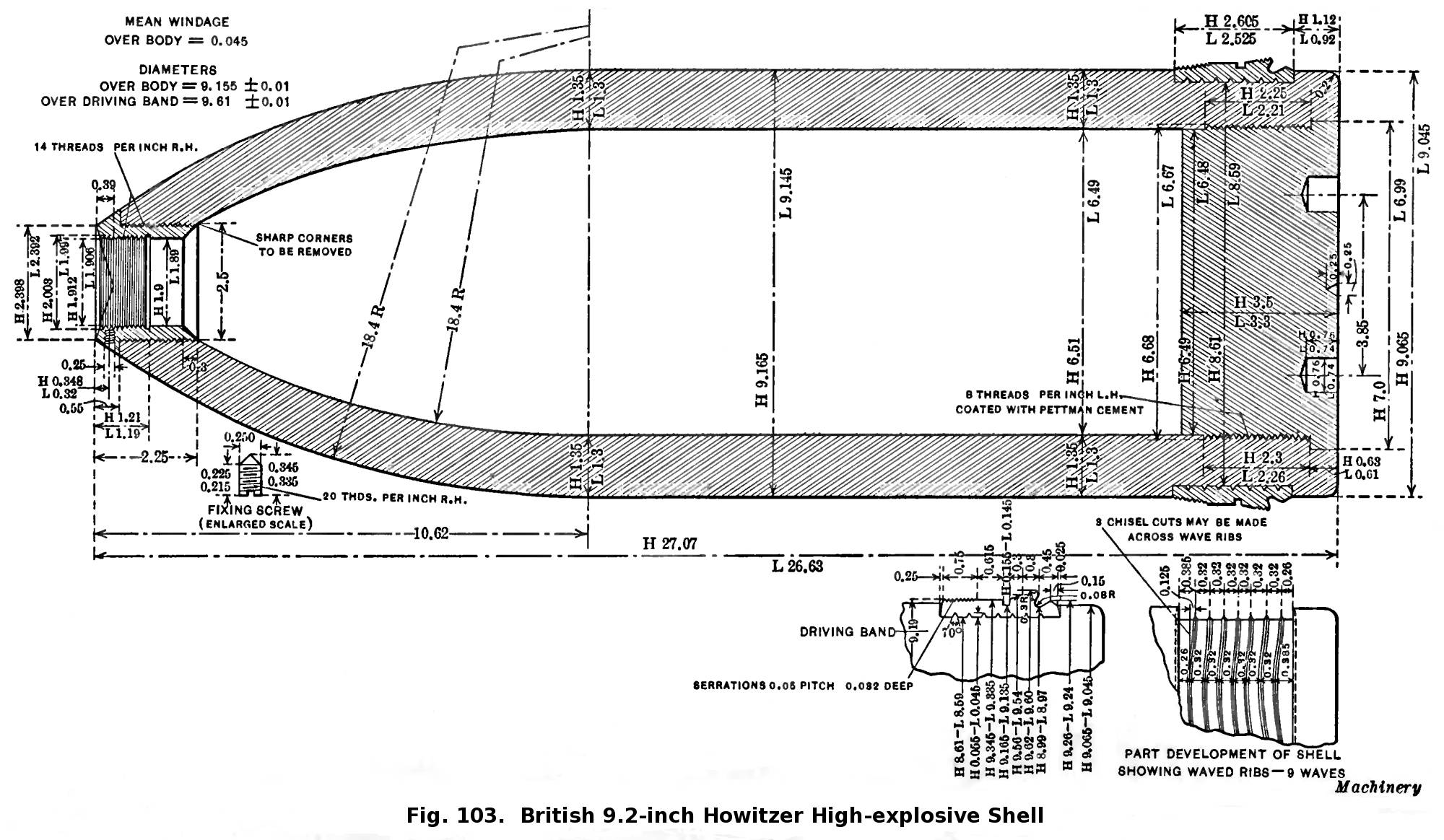
2 C.R.H. BL 9.2-inch howitzer shell, 1916. See "18.4 R" pointing to curve of nose

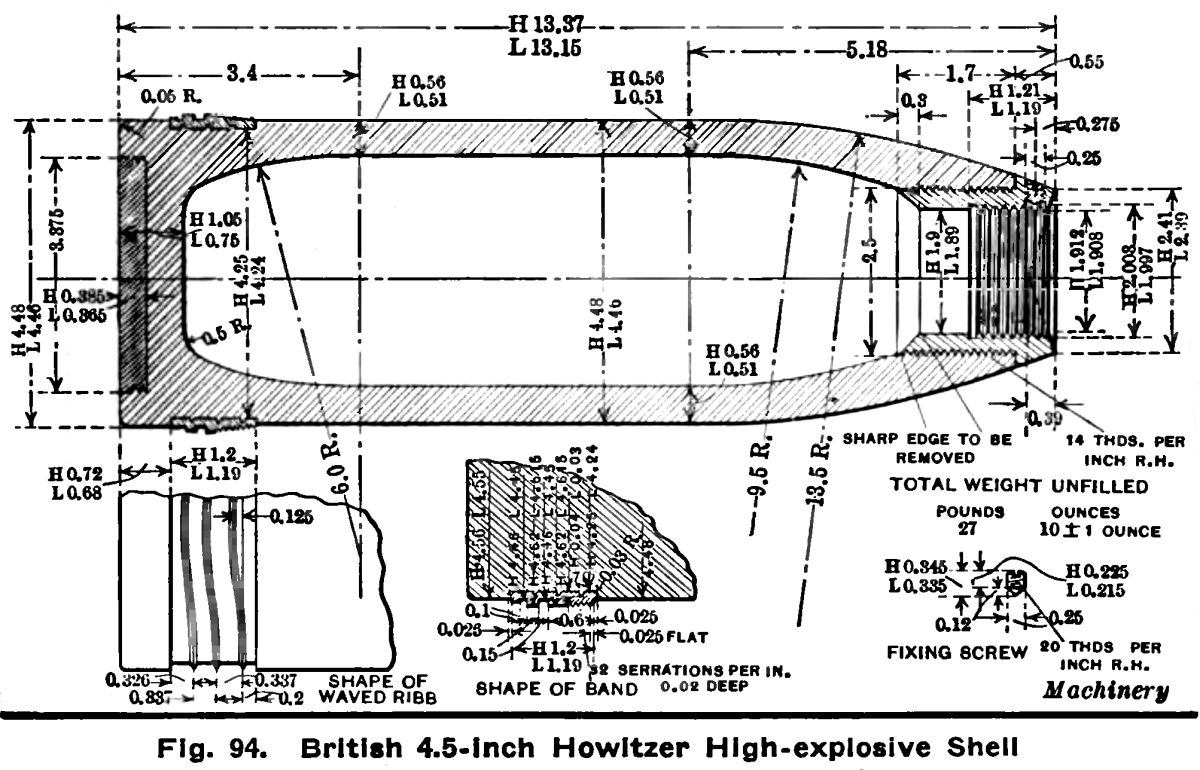
3 C.R.H. QF 4.5-inch howitzer shell, 1916. See "13.5 R" pointing to curve of nose

Calibre radius head: the radius of a circle with the curve of the shell's nose on its circumference, expressed in terms of the shell's calibre. The longer and more pointed (and hence streamlined) the shell's nose, the higher the C.R.H. Typical C.R.H. for British shells leading up to World War I was two: e.g. the curve of the nose of a two C.R.H. 6-inch (152 mm) shell was equivalent to the curve of a circle with a radius of 12 inches (300 mm). Shells of four C.R.H. were soon developed in World War I, identified by an A following the shell mark number, B for six, and so on. For modern streamlined shells post-World War I, two numbers were necessary to more correctly denote a shell's C.R.H. characteristics. For instance, the World War I 6-inch 26 cwt howitzer shell was two C.R.H., and the World War II Mk 2D shell was referred to as "5/10 C.R.H.".

== Cartridge ==
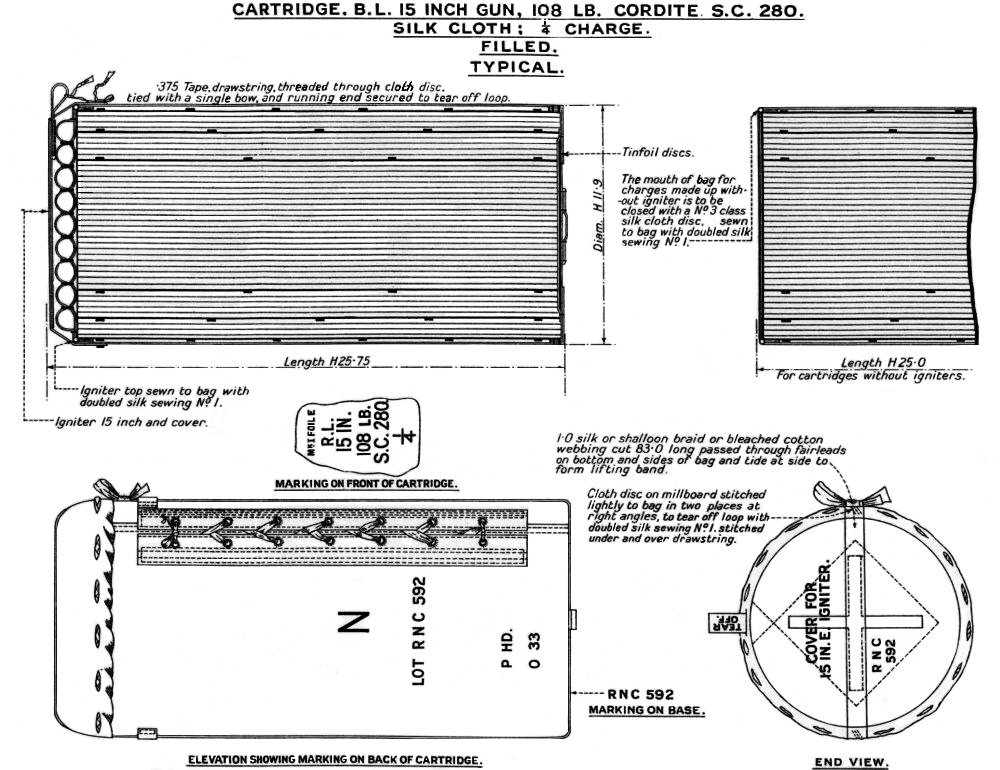
Cartridge in cloth bag consisting of 108 lb cordite SC 280 1/4 charge for BL 15-inch naval gun, WWII. Four of these cartridges were loaded together to make up the full service charge.

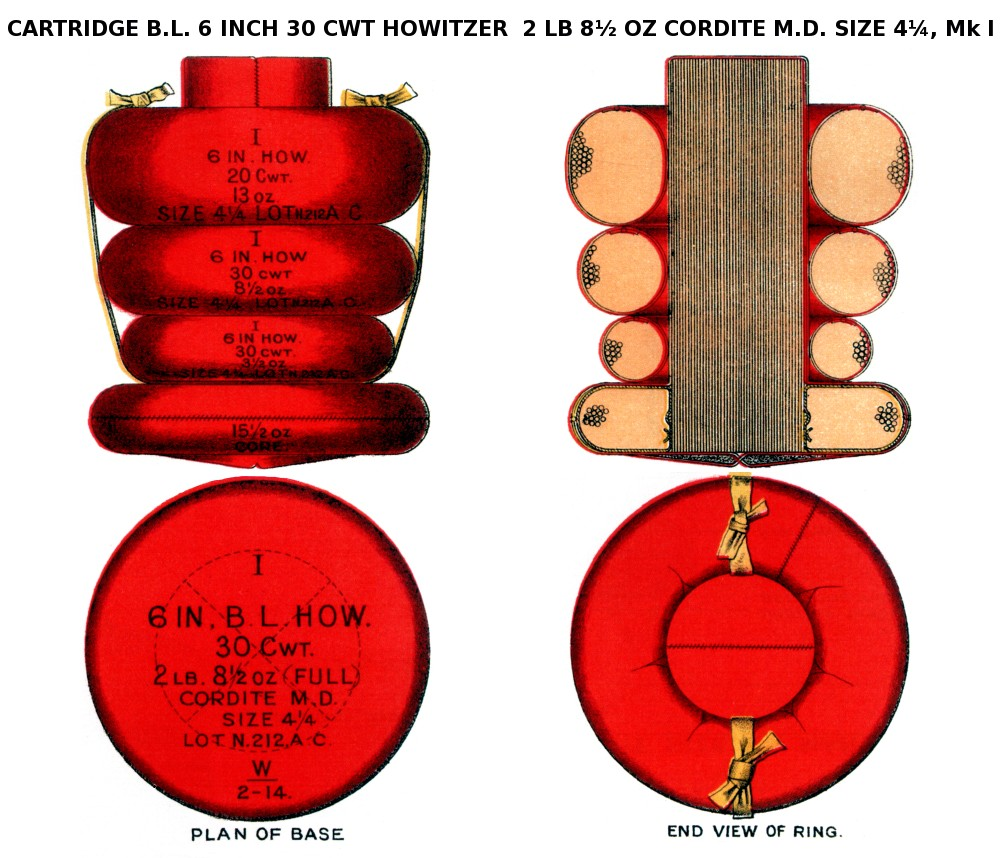
Cartridge in cloth bag for a BL 6-inch 30 cwt howitzer

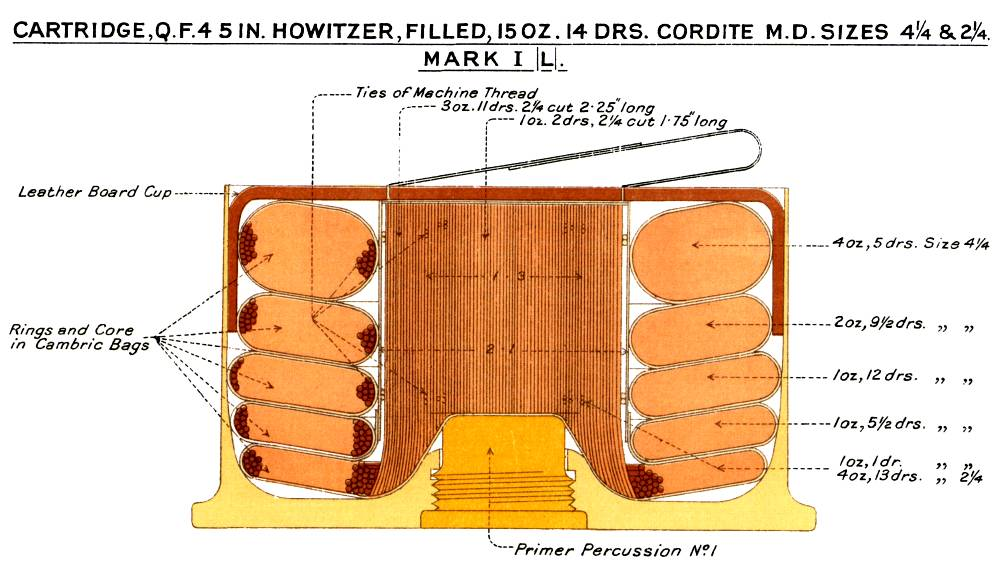
Cartridge in brass case for a QF 4.5-inch howitzer

"Cartridge" in British ammunition terminology typically refers to the physical object containing the propellant that a gunner loads.

For small arms and fixed QF artillery ammunition, e.g., the .303 or 18-pounder respectively, this denoted the complete round, that is, the cartridge case, percussion cap or primer, propellant charge and projectile. In this use it is synonymous with "round".

For separate QF artillery, cartridge referred to the cartridge case, its primer, propellant charge, and the disposable lid and fastener of the case.

In BL artillery terminology, cartridge referred to the propellant unit only – there was no case. British cartridges contained gunpowder until about 1892, and thereafter sticks of cordite bound together with an igniter pad, if necessary, in a cloth bag, usually silk. The "stick" nature of cordite gave the cartridges a degree of rigidity and hence they retained a tubular shape and could be handled and loaded as a solid unit even without a case. With BL, cordite is contained in one or more cloth bags joined together. The complete unit is termed a cartridge. The empty bag was termed an "empty cartridge". Heavy naval guns may require up to four separate cartridges to be loaded, each consisting of a 1/4 charge, to make up the full service charge.

Howitzer cartridges, both BL and separate QF, contained a central core of cordite surrounded by several stacked ring-shaped bags of cordite. To obtain the appropriate "charge" for the required range and angle of elevation, the gunner discarded one or more rings before loading.

See charge for how Ordnance QF 25-pounder charges varied in World War II.

== Cartridge case ==
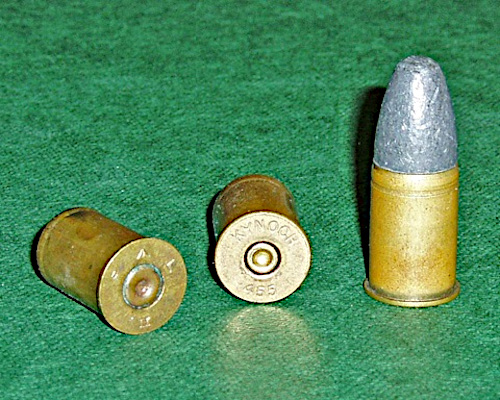
Cartridge cases and complete round for the .455 Webley

The case, usually brass, holding the propellant charge. Used with small arms and QF artillery ammunition. The QF cases in 1915 could be cleaned and then reloaded up to a maximum of six firings with Cordite charges, with the record detailing the "life of the case" marked on the base. The limitation on the number of firings was due to the case expanding on firing, having to be "rectified" by turning metal off the lower part, which restored the correct dimensions but progressively weakened the case.

== Charge ==
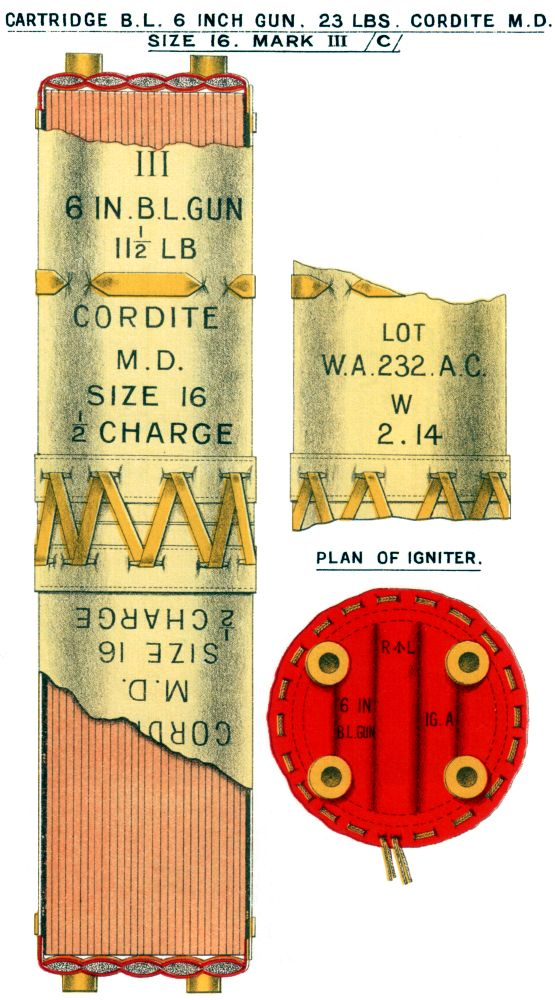
BL 6-inch gun cartridge of two half charges laced together to provide a full charge

Charge was a concept or category label rather than a specific item. It can be described as "the standard amount of propellant specified to carry out a particular purpose":

- Full service charge: the full amount of propellant intended for use in action at maximum range, for the usual shell. If a gun had e.g. a "heavy" and a "light" shell, there would be a separate charge associated with the heavy and light shells.
- Reduced service charge: for practice or firing star shells (which were lighter than the normal shell).
- Proof charge: a charge giving 25% greater chamber pressure than the full service charge, intended only for the "proof" or testing of a gun.
- Blank charge: intended for firing without a projectile, usually a reduced charge.
- Battering charge: a specially large charge for use with "Palliser" projectiles, which were an early British armour-piercing projectile of the mid-to-late 19th century.

For practical purposes, specific cartridges were specified for use to obtain the required charge. A gunner dealt with cartridges and would know that he could load (e.g.) cartridge X or Y for a full service charge for his gun, and cartridge Z to fire a star shell. Cartridges were sometimes made up of fractions of charges e.g. a 6-inch (152 mm) gun cartridge may be made up of two half charges or one two-fifths and one three-fifths laced together. A gun normally fired all rounds using the full charge, and varied the range by elevating or depressing the barrel.

A howitzer gunner's job was more complicated because the range table would specify different "charges", or fractions of the full service charge, for different ranges and angles of shell descent. The standard cartridge for his gun, which as a whole made up the full service charge, would consist of a central "mushroom" cordite core and several smaller cordite rings in bags stacked around the core like doughnuts, all tied together. It was designed so that one or more rings could be quickly removed and discarded before loading, hence providing progressively smaller charges. E.g. if the gunner on a QF 4.5-inch howitzer was ordered to load charge four, he would know he had to remove the top ring from the cartridge, leaving four rings; for charge three he would remove two rings. Discarded rings were burned after the action. This was the standard procedure for howitzers up to and including World War II.

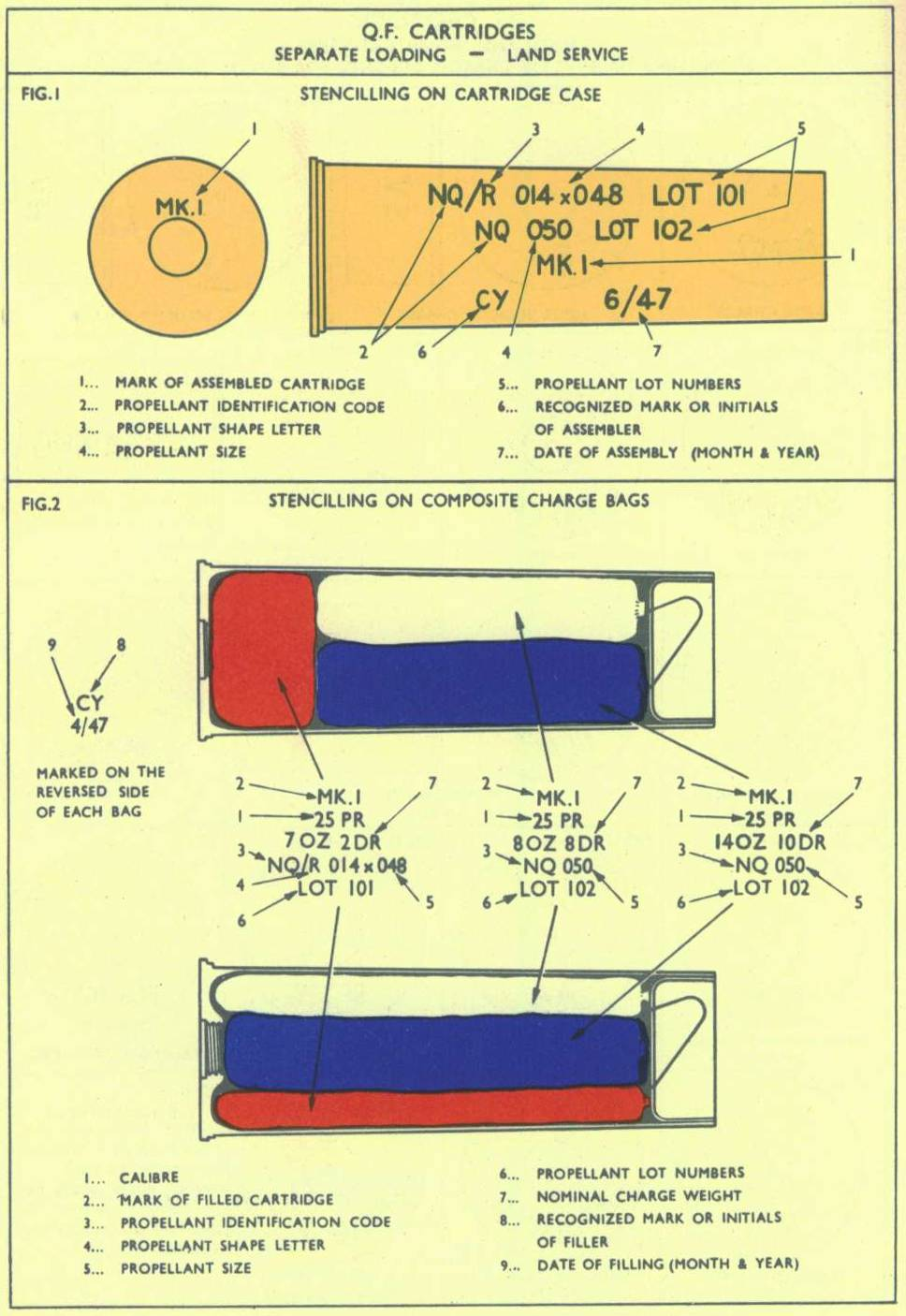
Charge bags arranged in QF 25 pounder cartridge case

In World War II a different system was introduced for varying charges for the QF 25 pounder gun-howitzer, which used separate-loading QF ammunition. A separate 2.7-pound (1.2 kg) "super charge" cartridge was available for firing the 20-pound (9.1 kg) high-velocity anti-tank AP shot, and an additional 4.5-ounce (130 g) "super charge increment" could be added to that for even higher velocity. The cartridge for firing the standard 25-pound (11 kg) shell came ready-loaded with a red bag at the bottom containing the basic charge (charge one), together with white and blue bags laid lengthwise, as in a conventional gun charge, to make up the full service charge (charge three). The blue and white bags could be removed to provide progressively reduced charges (charge two and charge one). From 1944 one or two 4-ounce (110 g) "intermediate charge increments" could be added to the standard charge (replacing the blue bag) for high-angle fire and to provide greater control over angle of shell descent.

For small arms or fixed QF ammunition, where the charge could not be varied by the gunner, the term charge was used to identify the Cordite propellant within the cartridge case, and the round as a whole was referred to as a full or reduced charge. E.g. an 18-pounder star round consisted of a cartridge case containing a reduced charge, and an attached star shell.

== Common lyddite ==
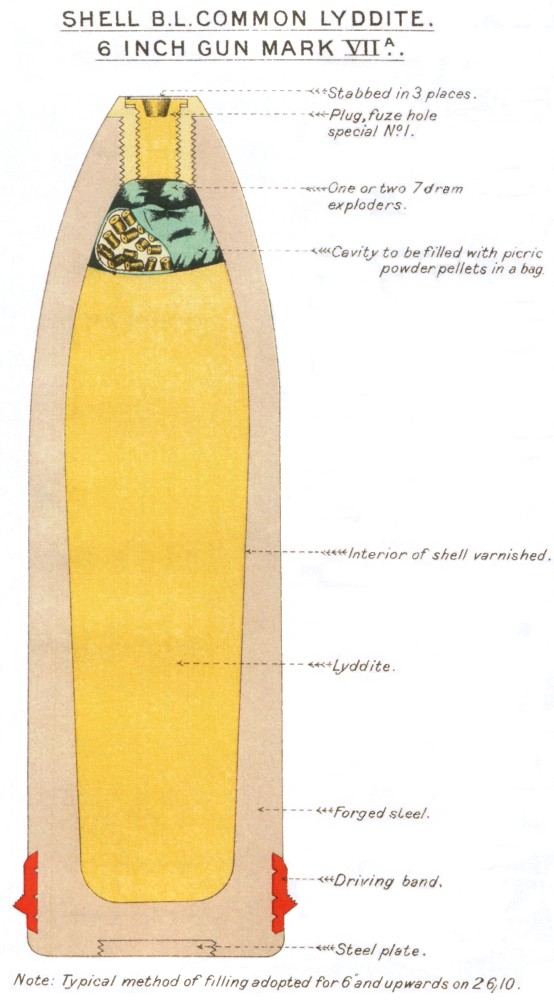
Later design common lyddite 6-inch naval shell, four C.R.H., showing shell wall thicker at base and exploders between nose fuze and lyddite filling

British explosive shells filled with Lyddite were initially designated "common lyddite" and beginning in 1896 were the first British generation of modern "high explosive" shells. Lyddite is picric acid fused at 280 °F (138 °C) and allowed to solidify, producing a much denser dark-yellow form which is not affected by moisture and is easier to detonate than the liquid form. Its French equivalent was "melinite", Japanese equivalent was "shimose". Common lyddite shells "detonated" and fragmented into small pieces in all directions, with no incendiary effect. For maximum destructive effect the explosion needed to be delayed until the shell had penetrated its target.

Early shells had walls of the same thickness for the whole length, later shells had walls thicker at the base and thinning towards the nose. This was found to give greater strength and provide more space for explosive. Later shells had 4 c.r. heads, more pointed and hence streamlined than earlier 2 c.r.h. designs.

Proper detonation of a lyddite shell would show black to grey smoke, or white from the steam of a water detonation. Yellow smoke indicated simple explosion rather than detonation, and failure to reliably detonate was a problem with lyddite, especially in its earlier usage. To improve the detonation "exploders" with a small quantity of picric powder or even of TNT (in smaller diameter shells, such as in 3-pounder and 12-pounder guns) was loaded between the fuze and the main lyddite filling or in a thin tube running through most of the shell's length.

Lyddite presented a major safety problem because it reacted dangerously with metal bases. This required that the interior of shells had to be varnished, the exterior had to be painted with leadless paint and the fuze-hole had to be made of a leadless alloy. Fuzes containing any lead could not be used with it.

When World War I began Britain was replacing lyddite with modern "high explosive" (HE) such as TNT. After World War I the term "common lyddite" was dropped, and remaining stocks of lyddite-filled shells were referred to as HE (high explosive) shell filled lyddite. Hence "common" faded from use, replaced by "HE" as the explosive shell designation.

Common lyddite shells in British service were painted yellow, with a red ring behind the nose to indicate the shell had been filled.

For shellite, a successor of lyddite, see HE below.

== Common pointed ==
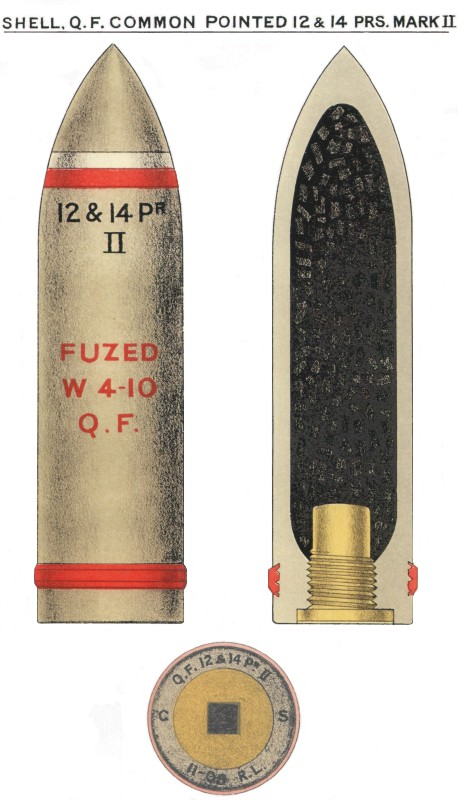
QF 12-pounder common pointed shell

Common pointed shells, or CP were a type of common shell used in naval service from the 1890s to the 1910s which had a solid nose and a percussion fuze in the base rather than the common shell's nose fuze. The ogival two C.R.H. solid pointed nose was considered suitable for attacking shipping but was not armour-piercing - the main function was still explosive. They were of cast or forged (three- and six-pounder) steel and contained a gunpowder bursting charge slightly smaller than that of a common shell, a tradeoff for the longer heavier nose.

In British service common pointed shells were typically painted black, except 12-pounder shells specific for QF guns which were painted lead colour to distinguish them from 12-pounder shells usable with both BL and QF guns. A red ring behind the nose indicated the shell was filled.

By World War II they were superseded in Royal Navy service by common pointed capped (CPC) and semi-armour piercing (SAP), filled with TNT.

== Common shell ==
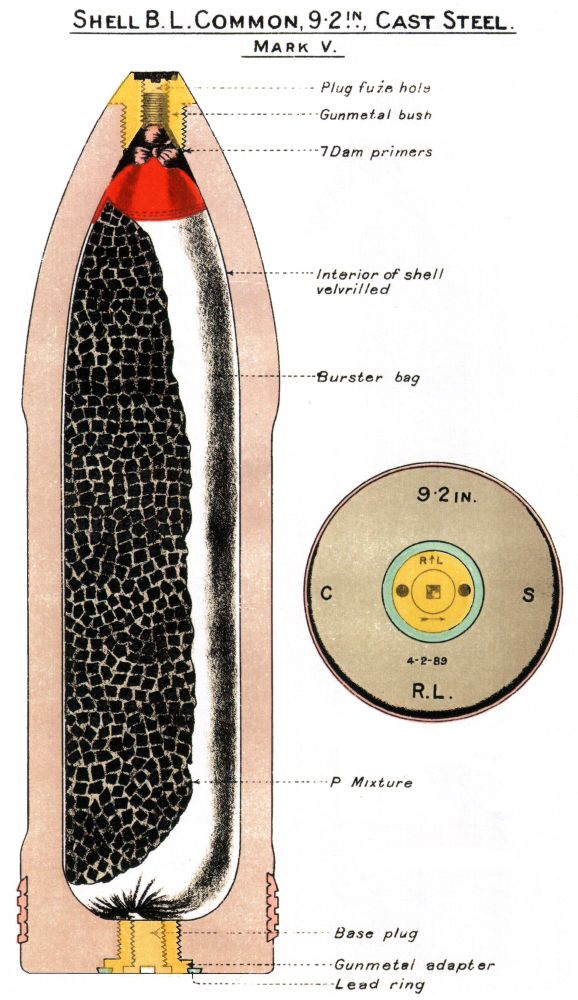
BL 9.2-inch common shell, 1889

"Common shell" is a designation for early 19th century British explosive shells filled with "low explosives" such as "P mixture" (gunpowder) and usually had the fuzes located in the nose. Common shells on bursting (they did not "detonate") tended to break into relatively large fragments which continued along the shell's trajectory rather than laterally. They had some incendiary effect.

In the late 19th century "double common shells" were developed, lengthened so as to approach twice the standard shell weight, to carry more powder and hence increase explosive effect. They suffered from instability in flight and low velocity and were not widely used.

As at 1914, common shells 6 inches (152 mm) and larger were of cast steel, smaller shells were of forged steel for service, and cast iron for practice. They were replaced by "common lyddite" shells by the late 1890s, but some stocks remained as late as 1914.

In British service common shells were typically painted black with red bands behind the noses to indicate the shells were filled.

== CP ==
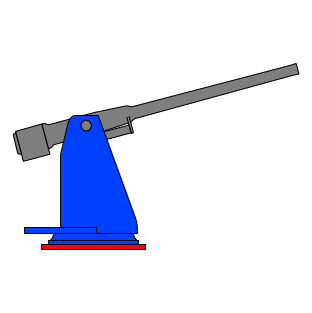
In the CP mounting, the rotating mass (blue) is mounted on a fixed central pivot (red) bolted to the deck.

Central pivot: was applied to a naval gun mounting that rotates around a central pivot that could be bolted to the deck without any structural alterations being required.

== cwt ==
The abbreviation cwt stands for hundredweight, which, despite the name, is equal to 112 pounds (51 kg), and signifies the weight of the gun barrel and breech. It is sometimes included in the name of a gun to differentiate it from other guns of the same calibre or weight of shot. For example, the QF 12-pounder 18 cwt naval gun is a different (and heavier) weapon than the QF 12-pounder 8-cwt Mk I naval gun, though they both fire shells of the same approximate weight (12 pounds (5.4 kg)).

== DCT ==
The director-control tower (DCT in British usage or "director" in US usage) was a feature of naval ships. It was a trainable turret incorporating the gun-laying sights and often a rangefinder. From here the gunnery officer could select targets and take the range, bearing and rates of change. This data would be provided to the transmitting station (TS), where a firing solution would be calculated and passed on to the gun turrets as the correct degree of training and elevation.

== Effective full charge ==
(Note: The British Army term is usually equivalent full charge)

Gun barrels naturally experience internal wear when fired, caused by mechanical wear from the projectile moving along the barrel, and thermal and chemical wear from propellant gases. This wear can reduce muzzle velocity and hence range, affect accuracy, produce unstable projectile flight, and, eventually, cause the gun barrel to fail.

Most guns are capable of firing different types of ammunition with varying charges, and not all of these combinations produce the same firing damage per round fired. The concept of ‘effective full charge’ provides a means of estimating the remaining life of a gun barrel taking into account the varying charges that can be fired from it before it becomes so worn as to be unusable from lost accuracy and velocity, or no longer safe.

To illustrate, the round (i.e. the combination of projectile and propelling charge) that produces the most firing damage is assigned an effective full charge (EFC) value of "one*. Other round combinations are assigned lesser values derived from testing and experience.

If a gun barrel is capable of firing three different round types: round A (EFC = 1); round B (EFC = 0.75); and round C (EFC = 0.25), and if 100 of each round type is fired, then the barrel is said to have fired (100×1.00) + (100×0.75) + (100×0.25) = 200 EFCs.

If it had previously been determined from testing and experience that this type of barrel has an estimated wear life of 250 EFCs, this specific barrel is at about 80% of its useful life. Plans would be made to order a replacement barrel within the time an additional 50 EFCs were expected to be fired. However the actual decision to retire any specific barrel would be made on examination and measurement of actual wear rather than that predicted by the EFC count.

In practice, a barrel might be replaced before reaching its EFC life, or the limits of wear. In the case of the 15-inch (381 mm) guns fitted to the World War I Marshal Ney-class monitors a gun was generally condemned when wear reached about 0.74 in (19 mm) at 1 in (25 mm) from the start of the rifling. However it was the usual practice to replace guns when their projected remaining life fell below the ship's normal full outfit of ammunition per gun, which ensured that the entire magazine could be effectively fired in action.

== Equipment ==
This was the term for a gun together with its gun carriage, i.e. the complete set of equipment needed to be able to fire the gun, as the gun could only be fired when mounted on its correct carriage. The carriage could be a wheeled carriage, a static siege carriage or include both a traversing mounting and railway wagon in the case of a railway gun. For example, a complete deployable gun might be described as "Ordnance QF 18 pdr gun Mk II on carriage, field, QF 18 pdr gun Mk I".

== Gunpowder ==
Britain employed gunpowder as a propellant until superseded by Cordite Mk I from 1892, and as an explosive filling in common shells until slowly superseded by lyddite from the late 1890s.

In World War I gunpowder was still in wide British use :

- in shrapnel shells as a burster to propel the bullets out of the case
- in "igniter pads" at the ends of cordite cartridges to facilitate ignition
- as the delay mechanism in time fuzes for artillery
- in vent tubes for firing guns.

British gunpowder designations were :

- E.X.E.: "extra experimental": propellant: mixture of 2/3 brown and 1/3 black powders, used with BL 6 inch guns Mk III, IV & VI
- L.G.: large grain: propellant
- Mealed powder: powder in fine dust form: used to ignite fuzes, friction tubes
- Prism or moulded powders: propellant pressed into regular hexagonal prism shape, with a hole in the centre to give even burning: included prism brown" (slower burning) and "prism black" (faster burning)
- P: Pebble powder: propellant in cube shape, designed to reduce the ratio of surface area to weight, and hence to slow the rate of burning to reduce strain on guns. A larger weight of P (approximately 16% more) is required than R.L.G. for an equivalent charge.
- S.P.: propellant: P specially selected for consistency, for use in BL guns
- P mixture: mixture of pebble and fine grain powders: explosive: filled common and common-pointed shells
- Q.F. mixture: explosive: filled medium-sized common and common-pointed shells
- R.F.G.^{2}: rifle fine grain: dogwood charred for eight hours: bursting charge for shrapnel and star shells
- R.L.G.: rifle large grain: propellant; explosive filling for armour-piercing shells
- S.B.C. slow-burning cocoa: propellant, brown powder (cocoa refers to the colour).

== Gas-check ==
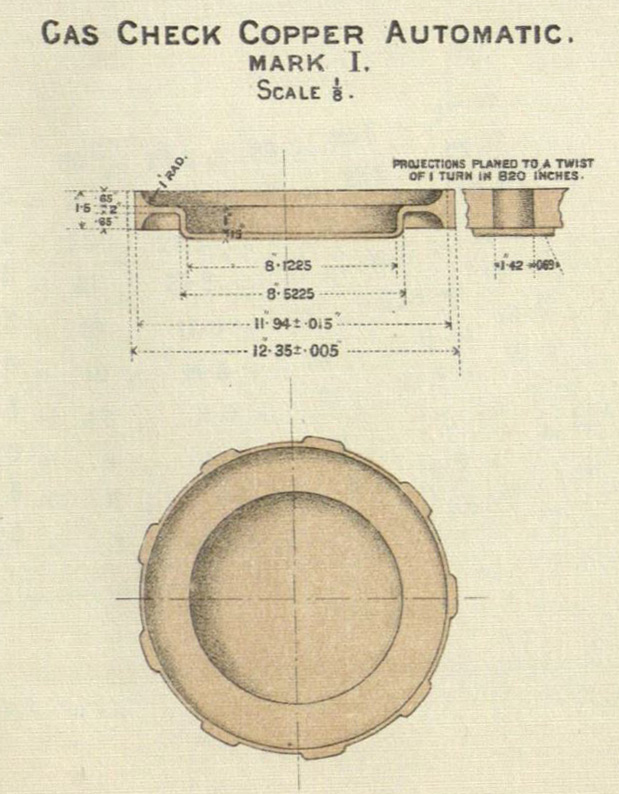
12-inch (30 cm) automatic gas-check

Attached to the base of RML artillery shells from 1878 onwards to avoid gas wastage on firing, and to rotate studless shells. It was an interim measure between studs and modern driving bands.

Related terms:

- "Attached gas-check" – used with studded ammunition
- "Automatic gas-check" – used with studless ammunition
- "Rotating gas-check" – synonymous with "automatic gas-check"

(Note: The term "gas-check" was hyphenated in official British government publications of the late 19th and early 20th century. These publications also used the term "automatic gas-check" while acknowledging that the term "rotating gas-check" had been used previously.

== HA ==
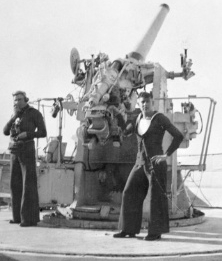
Gunners with HA QF 4-inch MK V gun on HMAS Canberra c. 1940

High angle: a naval designation equivalent to AA (anti-aircraft), for a gun mounting which was capable of an elevation exceeding 50° from the horizontal, allowing the gun to be used against aircraft.

== HA/LA ==
High angle / low angle: a naval designation, equivalent to "dual purpose", for a weapon intended for engaging both surface targets and aircraft, on a mounting capable of elevating above 50 degrees but also effective at low elevations. Typical examples were the QF 4-inch Mk XVI, QF 5.25-inch gun, and QF 4.5-inch gun used in World War II and later.

== HE ==
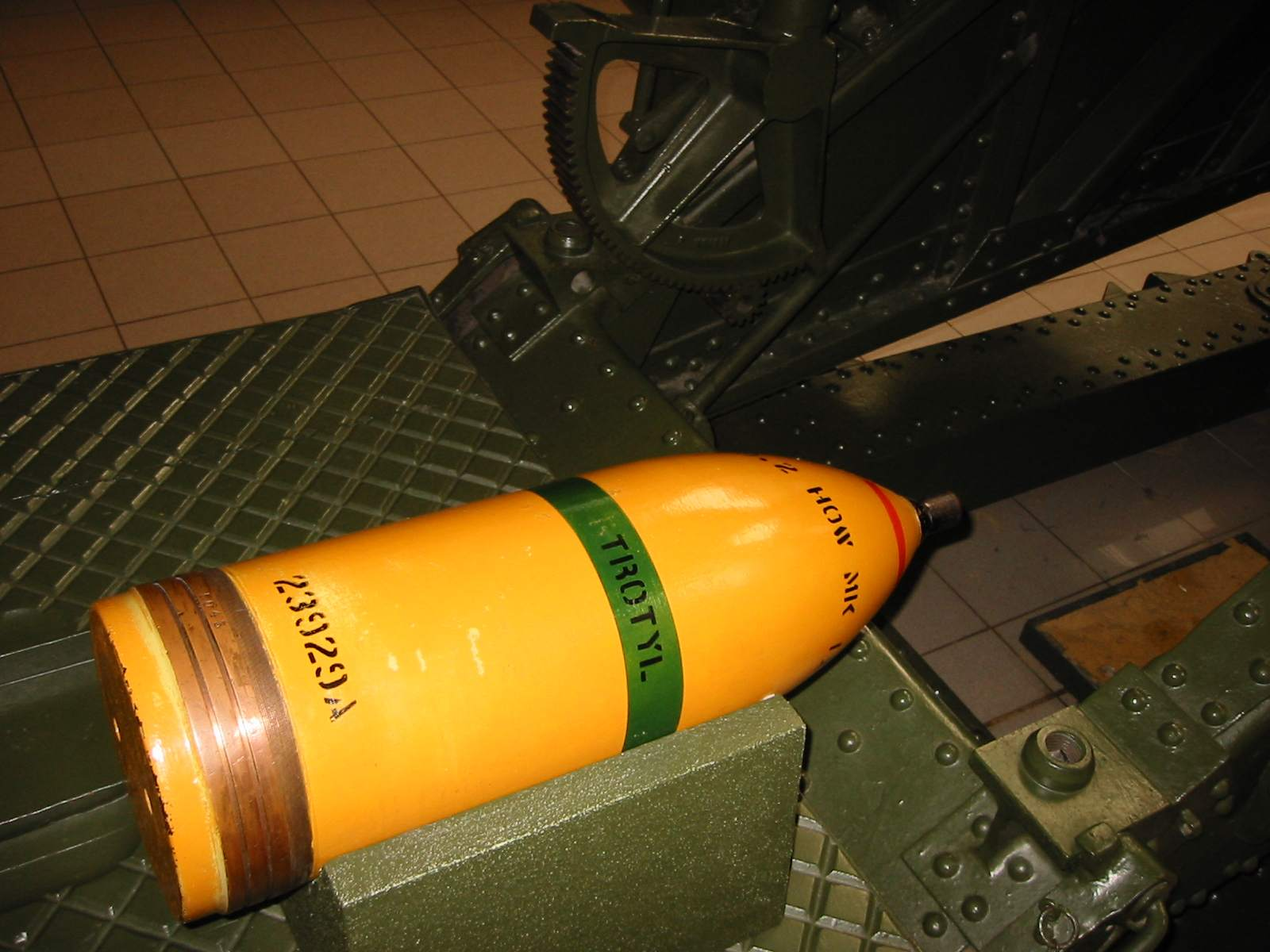
World War I-era HE shell for 9.2 inch howitzer. Red band indicates it is filled, green band marked "Trotyl" indicates filling is TNT.

"HE" in British terminology initially designated only shells filled with modern "high explosive" such as Trotyl (the British term for TNT), which was being introduced when World War I began, and Amatol from 1915. It contrasted with common shells, which were filled with older explosives such as gunpowder, and common lyddite, the earlier British high-explosive shell. Britain also used Tetryl before World War I under the designation "composition exploding" (C.E.).

The HE shell filling was detonated by a fuze, usually augmented by a "gaine" to ensure complete ignition, causing the thick steel shell case to shatter into large and small fragments at great velocity in all directions.

Britain first used pure TNT for land warfare shells from late 1914, but this proved expensive and difficult to manufacture in the necessary large quantities, and was also inefficient as much energy was output as heavy black smoke. Amatol, a mixture of cheap ammonium nitrate and TNT (initially "40/60": 40% ammonium nitrate and 60% TNT for land shells and 80/20 from 1917) proved 27% more powerful than pure TNT and was soon adopted as the preferred HE filling in World War I. TNT and Amatol were approximately 20% less sensitive to shock and hence safer than lyddite, and Amatol 80/20 cost only 7d per pound (£0.06/kg) to produce in 1917 compared to 1s 11d (£0.28/kg) for lyddite and 1s 3d (£0.21/kg) for TNT.

Britain was slow to move from 40/60 Amatol to the preferred 80/20 mixture during World War I, due to manufacturing difficulties. The preferred method for filling explosive shells was by pouring the molten mixture through the fuze hole in the shell nose or base. This was well suited to Lyddite filling, but it was found that Amatol with more than 40% ammonium nitrate did not pour well. Hence it was not simply a case of switching existing filling machinery from Lyddite to Amatol. Dry filling with Amatol 80/20 in block form and by pressing was used but was not considered to be a success. By the end of World War I the process for pouring 80/20 Amatol as a shell filling for land warfare shells had finally been perfected and was in large–scale production.

The Royal Navy resisted switching from Lyddite to Amatol for its shells because it considered Amatol was too hygroscopic (water-absorbing) to be suitable for use at sea, and instead used pure TNT as its high-explosive replacement for Lyddite. After World War I, remaining stocks of Lyddite-filled naval shells were redesignated "H.E. shell filled Lyddite", and henceforth the term H.E. encompassed all Lyddite, TNT and subsequent high-explosive shell types. From 1919 into the 1930s a less sensitive and safer version of Lyddite named Shellite, consisting of 70% Lyddite and 30% dinitrophenol was used in naval AP shells.

Amatol continued in field use to 1945 when it began to be replaced by a 60/40 mixture of RDX and TNT.

High-explosive shells were typically painted yellow in British service in World War I, with a red ring below the nose to indicate the shell was filled and a green ring round the body to indicate filling with TNT or Amatol. In World War II they were typically painted olive green.

== LA ==
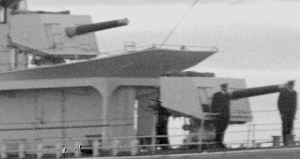
LA QF 4-inch Mk V guns on HMAS Waterhen circa 1930s

Low angle: a naval designation for a gun mounting not capable of high angles of elevation, and intended solely for firing at surface targets. In theory any CP mounting was an LA mounting by default.

== ML ==
Muzzle-loading. By World War II, there were no muzzle loading artillery guns in British use, so ML was used only for mortars, as the mortar bomb was dropped tail-first down the barrel from the muzzle.

== Ordnance ==
In British use, ordnance meant the barrel and breech, without mounting, of a gun. The gun with its mounting was called an equipment. For example, a complete deployable gun might be described as ordnance QF 18 pdr gun Mk II on carriage, field, QF 18 pdr gun Mk I.

== P ==
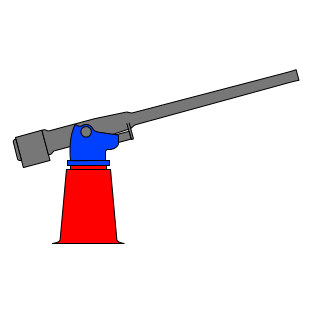
In the P mounting, the rotating mass (blue) is mounted on a pedestal (red) which is fixed to the deck.

P refers to a "pedestal" mounting for a gun, and was used by the Royal Navy. It differed from a central pivot mounting in that the mounting rotated around a fixed pedestal, rather than being bolted directly to the deck.

== Pounder ==
Many British naval and land artillery pieces of this period continued to be categorised by their pound rating, the weight in pounds of the shell that they fired, rather than by their bore. For example, a gun firing 32-pound projectiles was called a "32-pounder", abbreviated pdr. Larger guns, such as the RML 9 inch 12 ton gun, were more often categorised by their bore. This system was still in use after World War II. A rough pound rating to bore conversion for that time is the 1-pounder (37 mm), 2-pounder (40 mm), 3-pounder (47 mm), 6-pounder (57 mm), 17-pounder (76.2 mm), 25-pounder (87.6 mm), and 60-pounder (127 mm).

== Preponderance ==
This term was used in the 19th century, which specified the amount by which the breech end of a gun mounted on trunnions was heavier than the muzzle end. This was determined by the location of the trunnions, the lugs on the barrel by which it rotated in its mounting, which were usually located slightly forward of the gun's centre of gravity. E.g. if the preponderance was quoted as 4 tons 2 1/2 cwt (4.2 t) as for the RML 17.72-inch "100-ton" gun, the breech end sat with that weight on its mounting, enough to ensure stability but not enough to hinder changes in elevation. The preponderance of British muzzle-loading guns was typically stamped on the end of one of the trunnions. The term was dropped when it became meaningless with the replacement of trunnions by more modern methods of mounting guns on recoil slides in the 20th century.

== QF ==
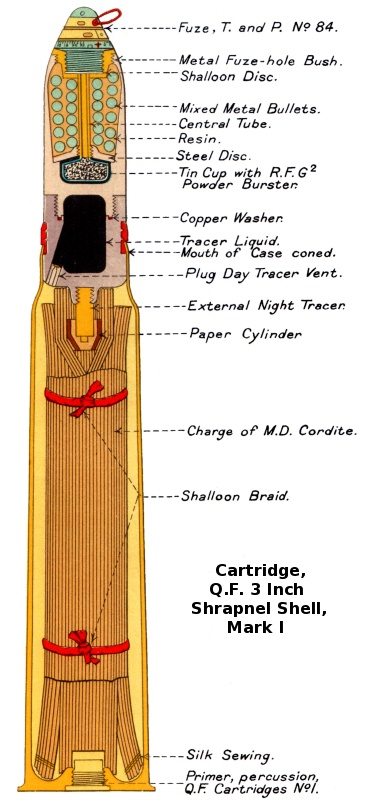
Fixed QF 3-inch 20 cwt round

The term QF came from "quick-firing". The designation was put into use in the late 19th century in two different meanings. In naval terms it was first used for small guns firing fixed ammunition, that is, a complete round in one piece, consisting of a brass cartridge case containing both the propellant and the projectile, thus enabling higher firing rates; an early example was the QF 6-pounder Hotchkiss. In later pieces, the charge was sometimes separate from the shell, to reduce the individual weight of loading, with the charge still in a brass case rather than a cloth or silk bag typical of "BL" guns.

In formal British ordnance terminology the term QF came to mean that the propellant charge is loaded in a metal case, usually brass, that provides obturation, that is, it seals the breech to prevent escape of the expanding propellant gas. The term QF hence referred to both the breech-sealing mechanism and the method of loading propellant charges. Ordnance of other countries employed other techniques, and hence this description and distinction is limited to British ordnance.

Following the early success of the light QF Hotchkiss and Nordenfelt guns in the 1880s, the Royal Navy implemented QF guns in all calibres up to 6-inch in the 1890s, and also converted various 4-inch and 6-inch BL guns to QF under the designation QFC. This all-QF era ended in 1901 with the BL 6-inch Mk VII gun and a swing back to BL guns. Since 1914 the trend has been to use QF for naval guns below 6-inch and BL for guns 6-inch and over.

=== Fixed QF ===
In lighter QF guns, including field guns and anti-aircraft guns, the round was complete: "fixed ammunition", where the shell was attached to the cartridge case like a large bullet. Examples are the QF 3-pounder Vickers, QF 18-pounder field gun, QF 4-inch Mk V anti-aircraft gun and the current 4.5-inch Mark 8 naval gun. Fixed QF was suited for rapid loading, especially at high angles, and was limited by the total weight of cartridge and projectile, which had to be easily handled by one man. A maximum total weight of approximately 80 pounds (36 kg) was generally considered suitable for sustained manual loading of fixed ammunition rounds; for modern automatic loading guns since World War II, the maximum weight is no longer the limiting factor. The Royal Navy gun standard as of 2014 was the 4.5-inch Mark 8 naval gun, using a fixed round weighing 81 pounds (37 kg).

=== Separate QF ===
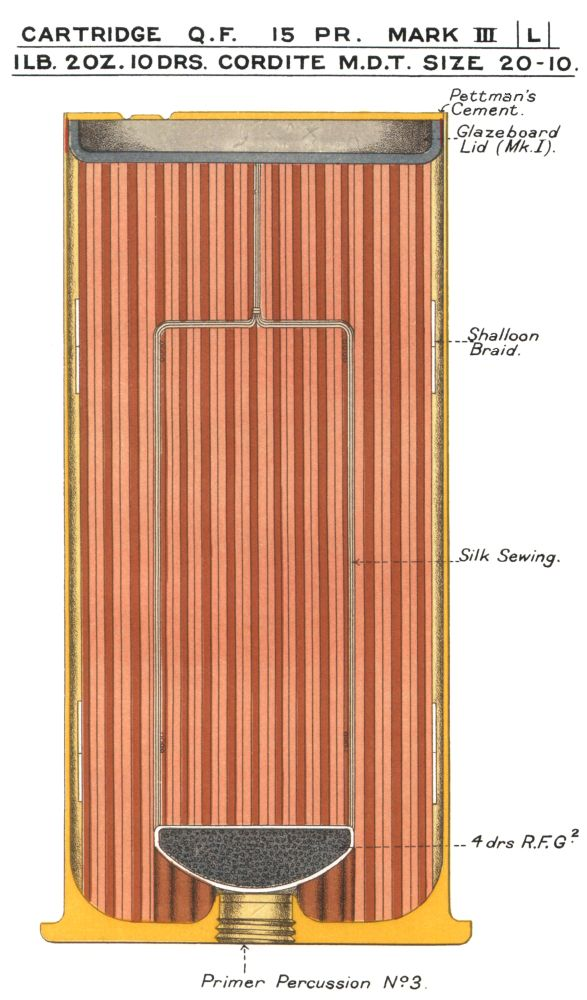
Separate QF 15-pounder cartridge

In other guns, typically naval guns 3 inches (76 mm) and above, such as the QF 12-pounder 12 cwt and QF 6-inch naval gun, and howitzers, such as the QF 4.5-inch howitzer and Ordnance QF 25-pounder gun-howitzer, the projectile was loaded separately to the cartridge case containing the propellant: "separate ammunition". This system was suitable for howitzers as it allowed the gunner to remove part of the cordite charge before loading, if required for shorter ranges. Having the cartridge and projectile separate also allowed the weight of loading to be shared by two men.

=== Characteristics ===
In all types, the primer for the round was in the cartridge case base. The term QF in British use referred to the breech sealing mechanism, in which the brass cartridge case provided the gas seal. This allowed a sliding block, which can generally be operated faster than a BL screw mechanism, and is characteristic of small to medium artillery. Early QF guns offered the advantage over BL guns that no time was wasted in inserting vent tubes after loading, as the primer was built into the case, and sponging out of the chamber was not necessary between rounds. QF also removed the risk of back-flash. QF also, by rigidly fixing the position of the primer, igniter and cordite charge in the case relative to each other, improved the chances of successful firing compared to BL with its flexible bags.

By the early 20th century British doctrine held that QF ammunition, while allowing faster-operating breeches, had the disadvantage that ammunition is heavier and takes up more space, which was limited on warships. For guns larger than 6 inches (150 mm), it becomes impractical as the cartridge case becomes unwieldy for manual operation, and it does not allow charges to be loaded via multiple bags as BL does. Also, dealing with misfires was simpler with BL, as another tube could simply be tried. With QF the gunner had to wait a time and then open the breech, remove the faulty cartridge and reload. Already by 1900, modern BL breeches allowed the gunners to insert vent tubes while the gun was being loaded, obviating one of the previous QF advantages, and hence the Royal Navy abandoned the QF 6-inch gun and returned to BL 6-inch guns with the Mk VII.

Another potential disadvantage associated with QF came with the horizontal sliding block breech, as used with the QF 4.5-inch howitzer. With the gun traversed at high elevation, the block could not be operated, as it came into contact with the inside of the box carriage. Not all British QF guns in fact used sliding blocks – the QF 2.95-inch and QF 3.7-inch mountain guns and the QF 18-pounder used screw breeches. The thing to note is that their screw mechanism were much lighter and simpler than BL screw mechanisms and served merely to lock the cartridge in place.

British artillery doctrine considered QF, even separate-loading, as unsuited for guns over 5 inches (130 mm) following experiences with the QF 6-inch guns in the 1890s, while European militaries such as Germany continued to use separate QF with sliding-block breeches for large guns up to 15 inches (380 mm), with larger German guns loading part of the propellant charge in cloth bags followed by the main charge in the metal cartridge case.

In colloquial use, quick firing is artillery having attributes like recoil buffers and quick shell loading characteristics, introduced in the late 19th century.

== QFC ==
QF converted: in the 1890s there was much enthusiasm for QF technology, and many older BL guns had their breeches modified to use the same QF cartridges as the new QF guns of the same calibre. Examples were conversion of BL 6-inch Mk IV and VI guns which became e.g. QFC I/IV, and some BL 4-inch guns.

== QF SA ==
Quick firing, semi-automatic: applied to naval QF guns where there was a mechanism to automatically open the breech and eject the case after firing. This was useful to enable a high rate of fire. An example was the QF 3-inch 20 cwt anti-aircraft gun.

== RBL ==
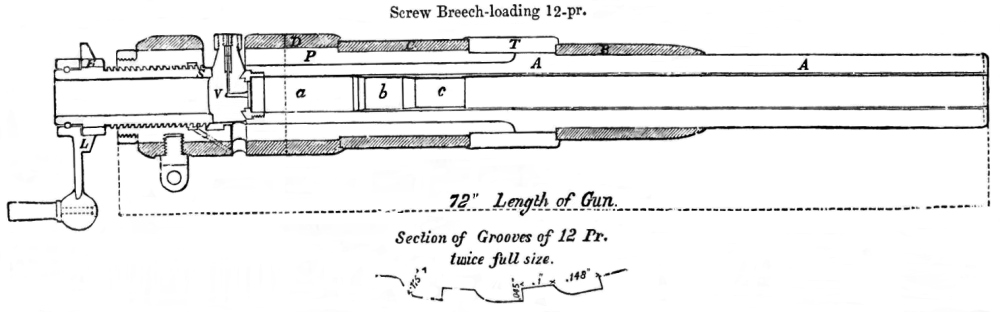
RBL 12-pounder gun barrel and breech

"Rifled breech loading": refers to the first generation of British rifled breech loading guns introduced in 1859 which used the unique Armstrong "screw breech" and included the RBL 12-pounder field gun and RBL 7-inch naval gun. These guns were originally known as "BL" (breech loading); the term "RBL" was introduced retrospectively in the 1880s to differentiate these Armstrong designs from the second unrelated generation of rifled breech loaders beginning in 1880 which are referred to as BL. The "RBL" guns were considered to be failures and Britain reverted to RML (rifled muzzle-loading) guns from the mid-1860s to the 1880s.

== Recuperator ==
"Recuperator" was the British name for the mechanism which returned the gun barrel to its firing position after recoil. US ordnance uses the term "run-out cylinder".

=== Hydro-spring ===
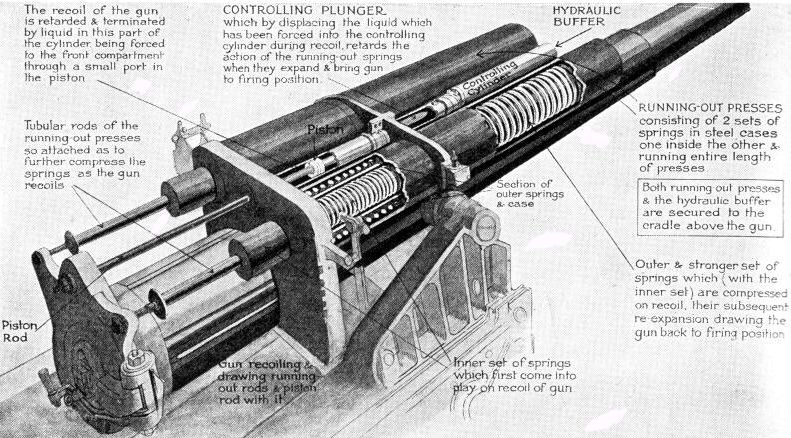
Hydro-spring recoil system of 60-pounder Mk I, which failed at Gallipoli

At the beginning of World War I runout after recoil was most commonly achieved in British 1904-vintage field guns and pre-1914 naval guns by a set of springs which were compressed when the barrel recoiled and then expanded again. Piston(s) moving through an oil reservoir damped the recoil, and springs collected the recoil energy and then used it to "run out" the barrel to firing position. This hydraulic configuration was referred to as "hydro-spring". Typical examples were in the QF 13-pounder, 18-pounder, and BL 60-pounder Mk I guns, all dating from 1904 to 1905, where the oil, pistons and springs were integrated in a tubular housing above the barrel. This configuration made the entire recoil system vulnerable to enemy gunfire, and it was protected to some extent in the field by being wound with thick rope. Other guns, typically naval guns, had the pistons in separate housings below the barrel. Note that "hydro-" refers here to hydraulic machinery, not water: as is common in such systems, oil was the liquid used, not water. For other applications of this type of system, see hydrospring.

=== Hydro-pneumatic ===
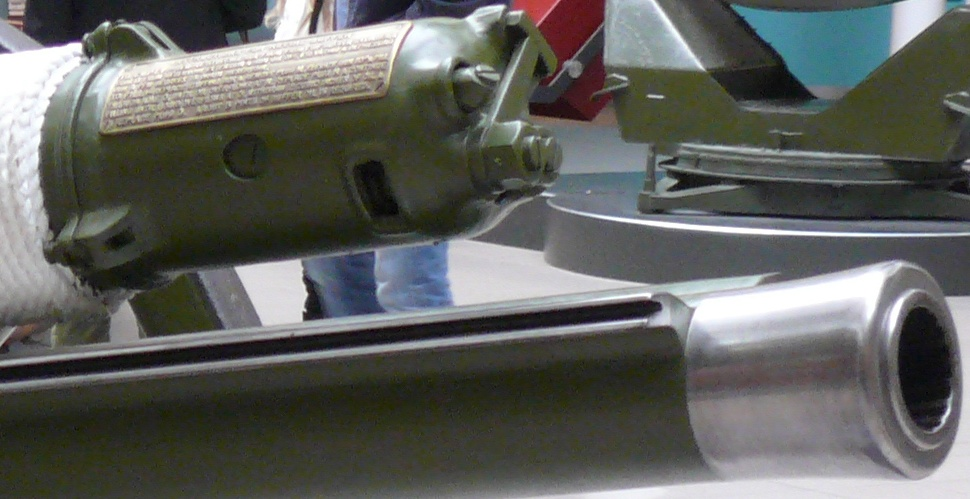
The field-fitted hydro-pneumatic recuperator extension (above the barrel) for 18-pounder Mk II gun, WWI

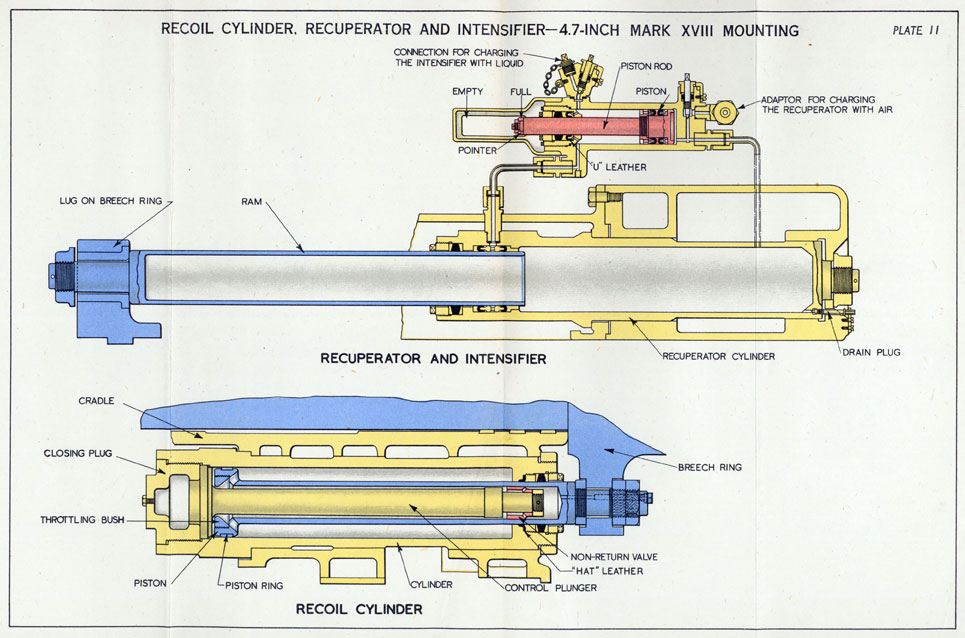
Pneumatic recuperator and hydraulic recoil cylinder arrangement of QF 4.7-inch naval gun, World War II

When World War I began, both the army and navy were in the process of introducing a "hydro-pneumatic" recoil system in which the recuperators were driven by air compression rather than springs. Examples were the navy's new QF 4-inch Mk V gun and the army's new BL 9.2-inch howitzer.

The unexpectedly heavy rates of fire experienced (mainly on the Western front) early in World War I caused many spring breakages in the 1904 generation field artillery (including in the Mk I 60-pounders at Gallipoli) and led to field modification of the 18-pounder which replaced the springs in the housing above the barrel with a pneumatic unit. By the end of the war the hydro-pneumatic system had become standard for a new generation of field artillery, typically seen in a box-shaped unit below the barrel in the 18-pounder Mk IV, 60-pounder Mk II, 6-inch howitzers, 8-inch howitzers, and 6 inch Mk 19 gun.

== Ring shell ==
See Segment shell

== RML ==
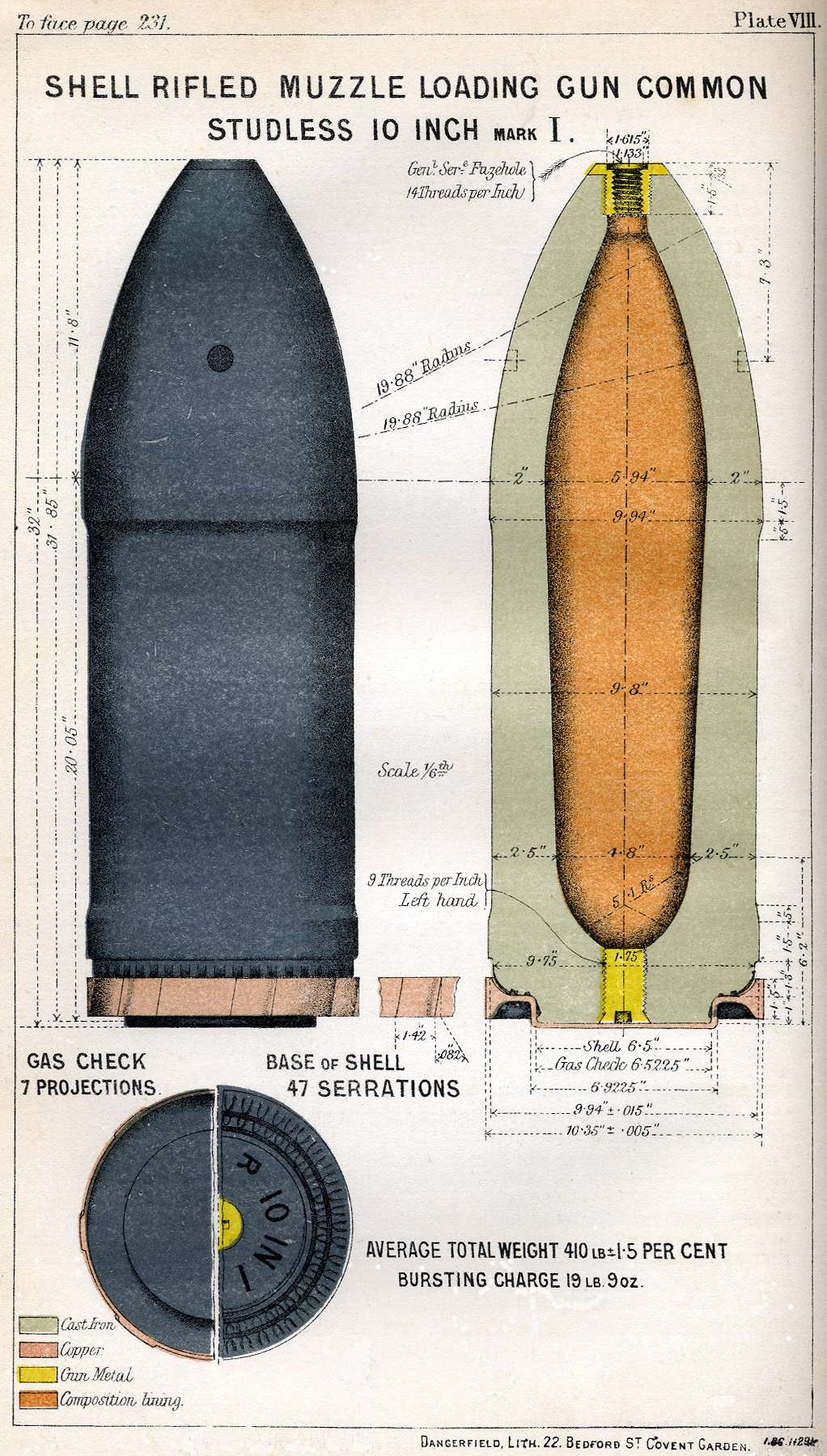
Late "studless" common shell with gas-check, for RML 10-inch gun, 1886

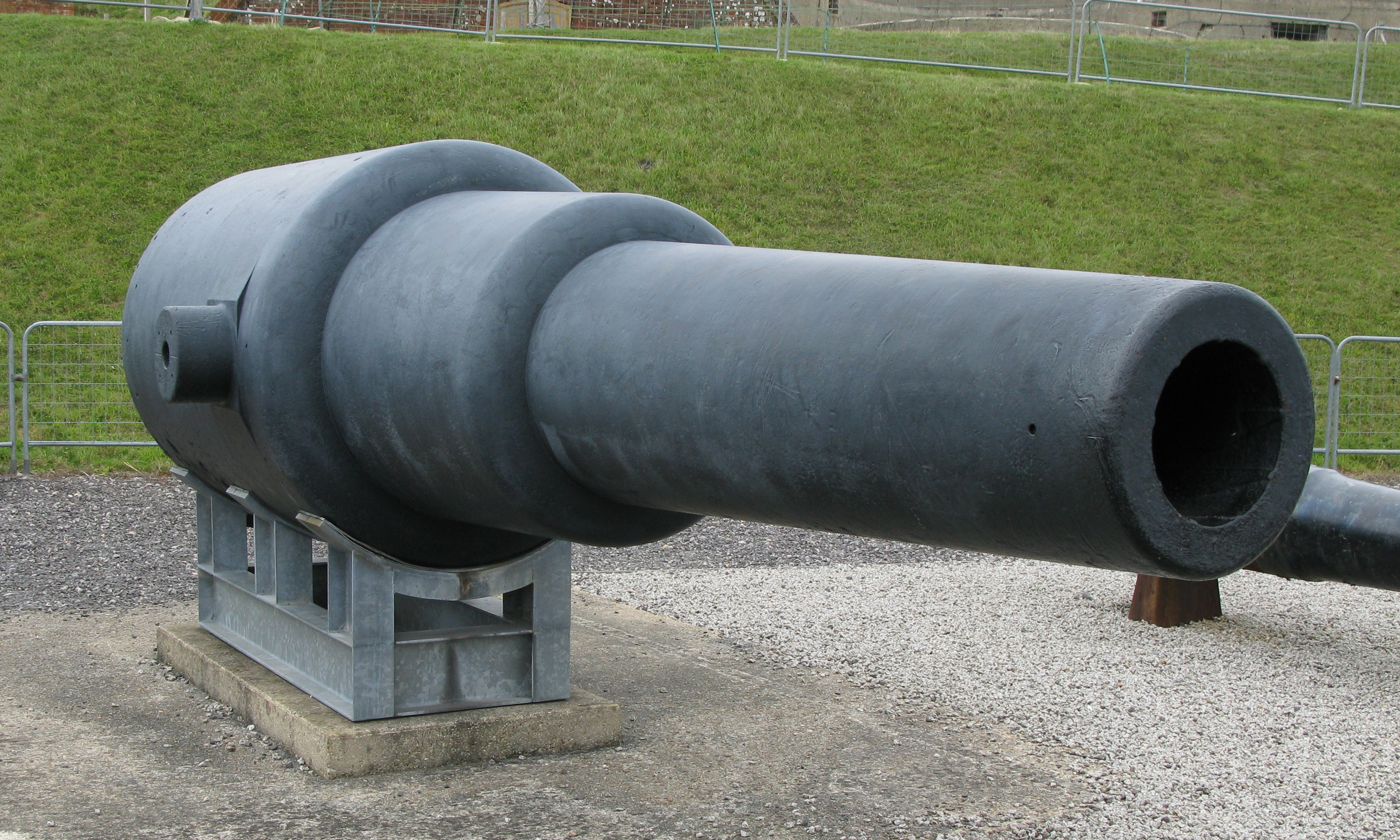
RML 12.5-inch gun

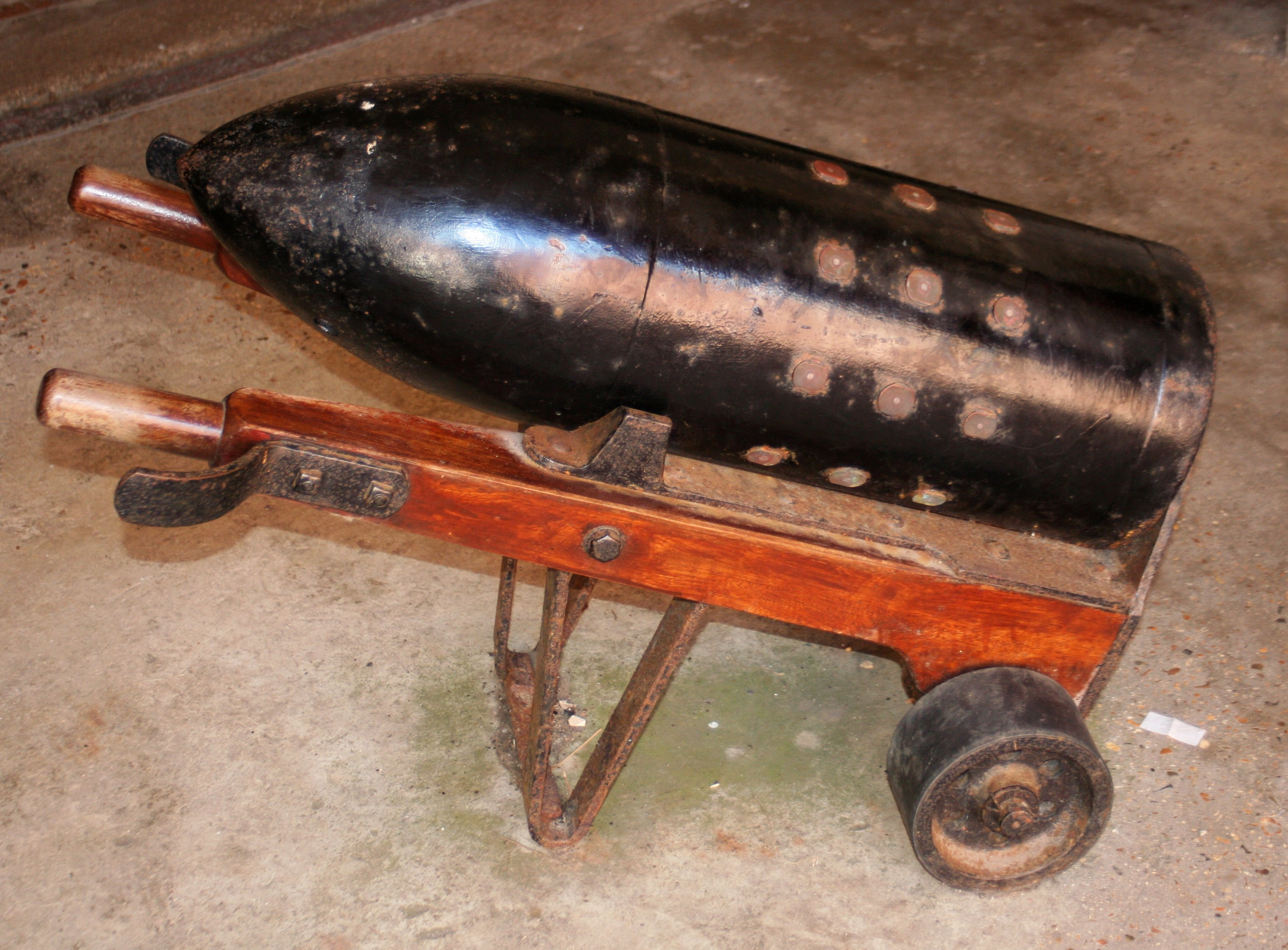
Shell for RML 12.5-inch gun showing studs

Rifled muzzle loading: introduced in British service in the mid-1860s following the unsatisfactory service performance of the Armstrong RBL (rifled breech loading) guns. The inside of the barrel had spiral grooves into which "studs" on the shell fitted, to spin the shell and hence improve accuracy and range. The propellant charge, followed by the projectile, is loaded through the muzzle. "RML" became necessary to distinguish between the new rifled and old unrifled smoothbore muzzle loaders (ML).

The first generation of British RML guns in the mid-1860s typically used William Armstrong's design of a wrought-iron "A" tube surrounded by multiple wrought-iron coils. Later marks of guns built by the Royal Gun Factory from the late 1860s onward introduced a toughened mild steel "A" tube to increase the gun's strength, and also used fewer but heavier coils to reduce the cost of manufacture. RML guns in British government service were designed by the Royal Gun Factory, Woolwich, and typically had only a few (three to nine) broad shallow rifling grooves, compared to the many sharp-edged grooves ("polygroove") of the Armstrong system. They were hence referred to as "Woolwich" guns.

From 1878 onwards "gas-checks" were attached to the base of RML shells to seal the bore and reduce windage; it was also found that these gas-checks could be used to rotate the shell, allowing studs to be dispensed with, which was an improvement as the slots in the shell for studs were found to be weak points leading to shells fracturing. The gas-checks evolved into the driving bands still in use today. Modern RML examples are rifled field mortars.

The largest RML gun built was the RML 17.72-inch gun, known as the 100-ton gun. In the 1870-1880s four each went to the Italian ironclads Duilio and Enrico Dandolo, and two each to coastal batteries at Gibraltar and Malta.

The last recorded active deployment of British RML guns was some RML 2.5-inch mountain guns in German East Africa in 1916, although several batteries of RML 9-inch Mk VI high-angle coast defence guns were in service in England throughout World War I.

== Round ==
The complete set of components needed to fire the gun once. Consists of a projectile, a propellant cartridge, and a primer or igniter tube. A fixed round had all the components integrated into a brass cartridge case with the projectile attached, e.g. a rifle cartridge or QF 18-pounder round, in which case Round is synonymous with cartridge. A separate round required the projectile and propellant cartridge (either in bags or brass case) to be loaded separately.

== RPC ==
Remote power control: this is where a gun turret or a gun director automatically trains and elevates to follow the target being tracked by the DCT and the table (computer) in the transmitting station (see above). Mountings would also have local control in the event of the RPC or director tower being disabled.

== S.A.P. ==
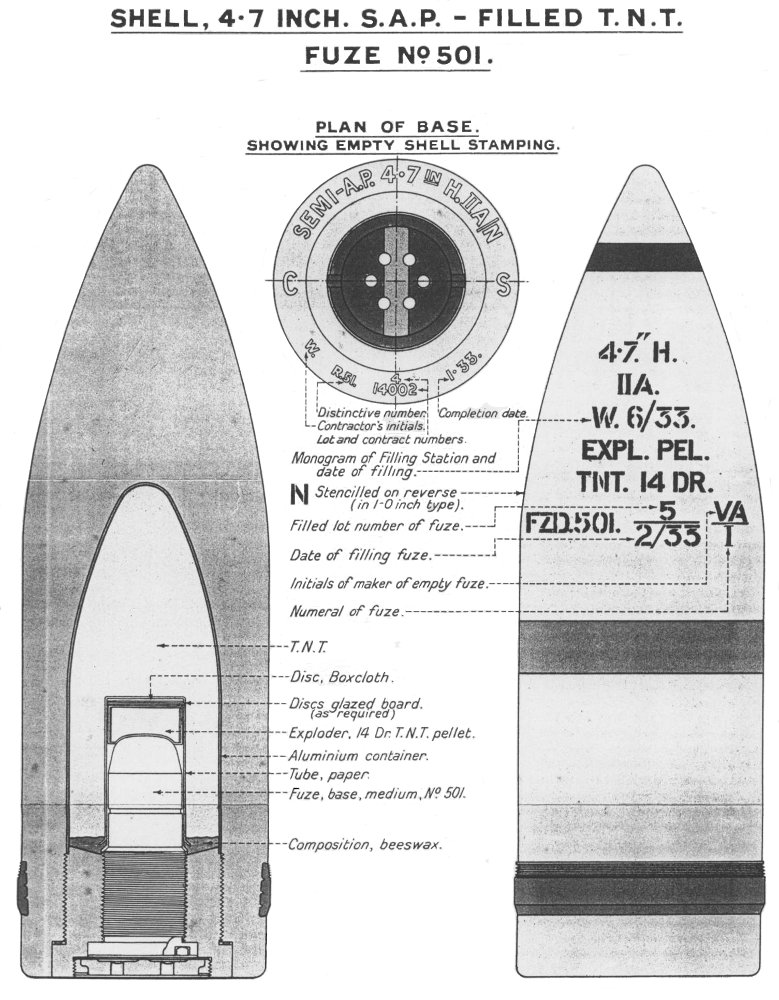
S.A.P. shell for the 4.7-inch naval gun, 1933

Semi armour-piercing: introduced after World War I as the successor to common pointed shells for naval use. They had a heavy solid nose and a medium amount of TNT explosive, giving them the capability to penetrate steel superstructures and a small thickness of armour. They were employed as the main shell for naval and coastal guns of 8 inches (203 mm) and smaller in action against warships. Later shells were streamlined with the addition of a pointed ballistic cap, and were designated SAP/BC. In World War II they were typically painted olive green, with a red nose.

== S.B.C. ==
Slow burning cocoa powder: a form of brown prismatic powder, i.e. gunpowder, with more charcoal, saltpetre and moisture but less sulphur than black powder. Cocoa referred to the appearance rather than composition. Used in the late 19th century for early large long-barrelled guns, where its slow-burning properties gave the projectile a prolonged smooth acceleration instead of the short violent acceleration typical of black powder. This powder was inefficient because most energy was expended as smoke, and enormous quantities were required, such as 960 lb (440 kg) for the BL 16.25-inch naval gun (also known as Elswick 110 ton guns) of 1888. Required a primer of black powder to ignite.

== SBML ==
Smooth bore muzzle loading denotes a barrel that is not rifled and where the projectile is loaded via the muzzle of the barrel. Most early cannons were of this type. British SBML guns of the mid-19th century were typically made of cast iron. In the 1840s, the 68-pounder 95 cwt was the last of this type of cannon introduced into British service. Modern weapons using this method of loading are light field mortars, in which the mortar bomb is dropped into the mortar barrel for firing; in these modern weapons the projectiles are spin-stabilised, but by fins rather than rifling.

== Segment shell ==
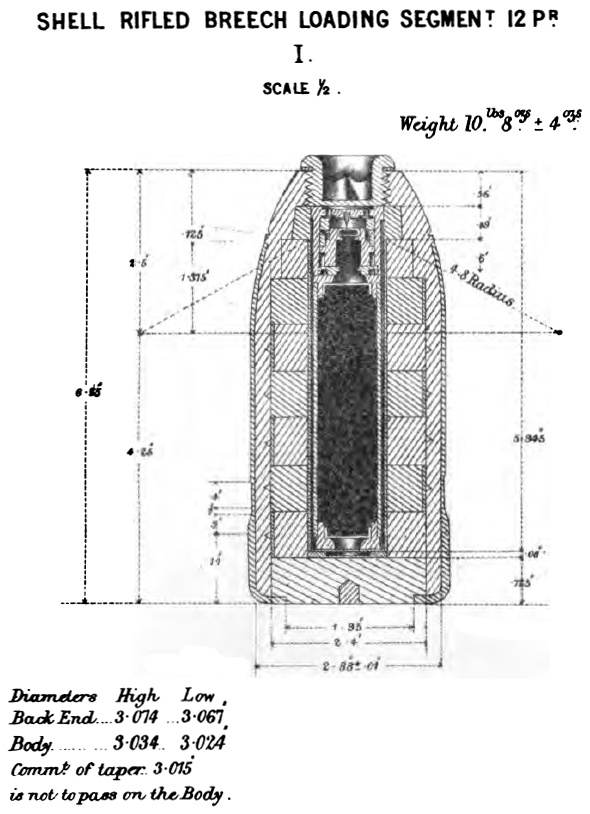
Segment shell for RBL 12 pdr Armstrong gun

Segment shells, also known as ring shells: this anti-personnel explosive shell originated in British service in 1859 and was designed by William Armstrong for use with his new breechloading field guns. The projectile was made up of layers of iron rings within a thin cast-iron shell wall, held together with lead between them, with a hollow space in the centre for the bursting charge of gunpowder. The rings broke up into segments on explosion. The explosive charge was typically about half that employed in an equivalent calibre common shell as less explosive was needed to separate and break up the rings than to burst the shell wall of a common shell, hence allowing more iron to be employed for the same weight of shell. It could be employed in the role of shrapnel, case or common shell. It was generally phased out in favour of common and shrapnel shells.

== Shellite ==
An explosive mixture of picric acid and dinitrophenol or picric acid and hexanitrodiphenylamine in a ratio of 70/30. It was typically used as a filling in Royal Navy, armour-piercing shells after World War I. Known as Tridite in US service.

== Steel shell ==
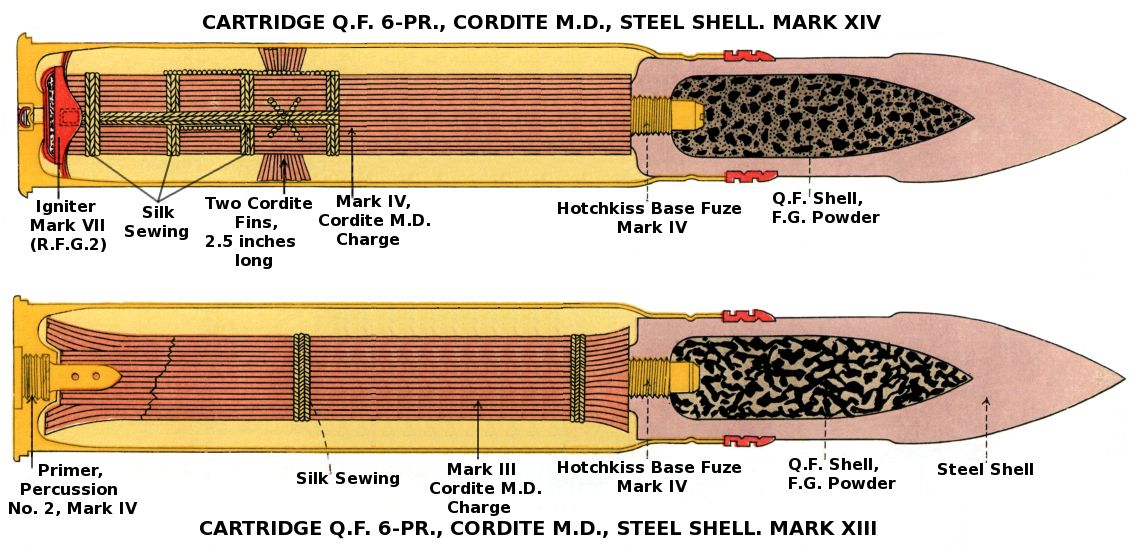
6-pounder Hotchkiss steel shell rounds

"Steel shell" was the British term for the 3-pounder and 6-pounder common pointed shells and some others such as the QF 1-pounder base-fuzed round. They had attributes of British common pointed shells as they were filled with gunpowder, had base percussion fuzes and a heavy pointed nose (almost three C.R.H.). But the nose was closer in design to British A.P. shells - the solid section was longer than common pointed, and the body held proportionately less powder than common pointed. It was intended for naval use.

In common usage, "steel shell" served to differentiate a shell constructed of steel from one constructed of cast iron (C.I.).

== Table ==
In the Royal Navy a table refers to a gunnery computer, such as the Dreyer Table, high angle control system table, or Admiralty Fire Control Table. The name probably originated with the Dreyer Table.

== Tube ==
See vent-sealing tube.

== UD ==
Upper deck: a naval gun mounting in which the rotating mass of the turret is mounted above the deck, with usually only the ammunition feed trunking piercing the deck.

== Velvril ==
"Velvril paint" was used to line larger common shells in the early 20th century to prevent the gunpowder filling from coming into contact with the iron or steel shell wall. This was both to avoid the saltpetre from causing corrosion in the presence of any moisture, and also provided a smooth surface that prevented friction between the gunpowder and shell wall, hence reducing the risk of spontaneous ignition when the shell was fired. It was made up of 24 parts zinc oxide, 3.5 parts yellow ochre, 0.5 parts red iron oxide, 15 parts nitrated castor oil, 7.5 parts nitro-cellulose of very low nitration, and 60 parts acetone oil.

== Vent-sealing tube ==
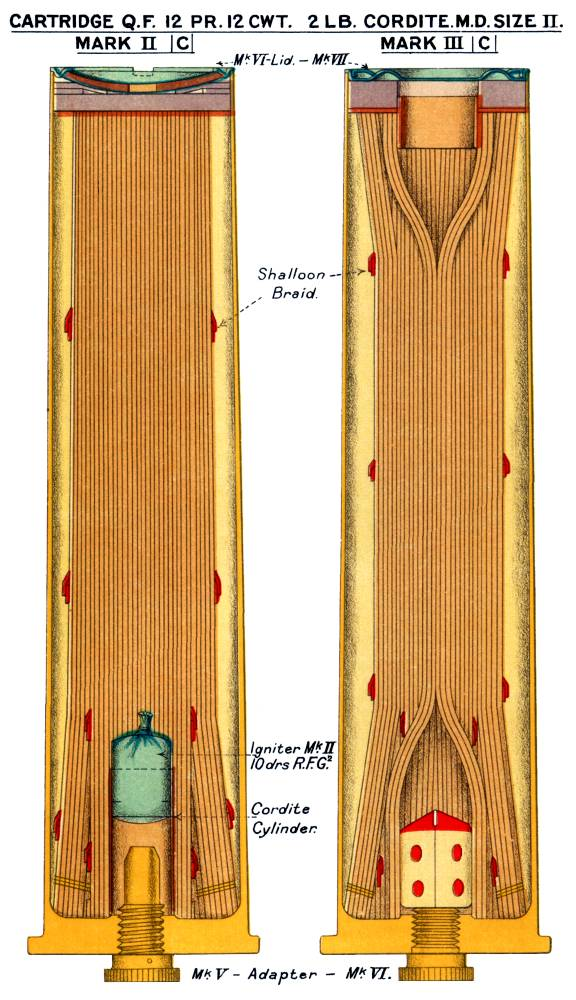
QF 12-pounder 12 cwt cartridges with adapter for V.S. tube

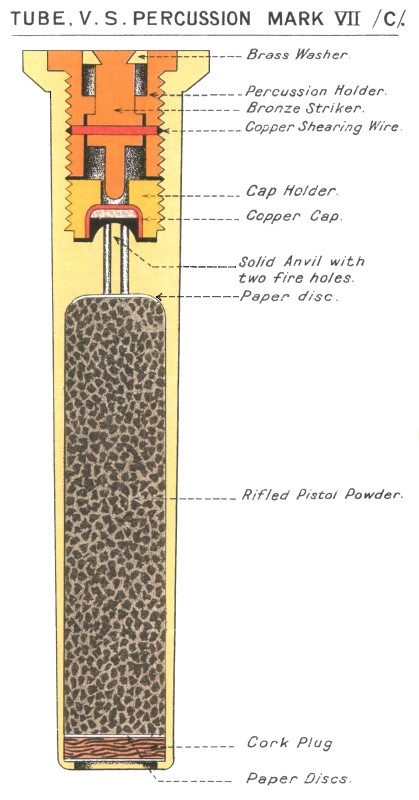
Mk VII percussion tube, standard for medium-heavy BL artillery in 1914

Usually abbreviated to "V.S. tube" or just tube. This was the traditional, reliable British method of fully igniting powder charges in BL guns to fire projectiles, especially large shells. Briefly, after the powder cartridge was loaded (or even during the loading process), the tube was inserted through a vent in the breech. Early vents were "radial" i.e. at right-angles to the barrel length, bored through the top of the barrel into the chamber; later vents were "axial" through the centre of the breech mechanism and "mushroom" into the chamber. When the breech was closed, one of several methods was then used to trigger the tube, which then sent a powerful flash into the breech. The flash ignited a special "igniter" material in the end of the cartridge, and the igniter in turn ignited the main propellant charge (some form of gunpowder or cordite). A powerful reliable flash from the tube was required because with bag charges, especially in the stress of combat or with variable howitzer charges, it could not be guaranteed that the igniter in the cartridge would be up close to the vent – it may have been pushed in too far, leaving a gap. The tube was designed to expand on ignition and seal the vent, preventing escape of gas. Tube types:

- Percussion tube – the tube was inserted in an axial vent in the breech and triggered by a firing pin in a percussion lock in the breech. Single-use. Used with medium-heavy guns and howitzers, e.g. 60-pounder gun.
- Electric tube – the tube was fired by an electric current from mains or battery. Considered safe, but cumbersome for field use. Common with naval and coast defence guns.
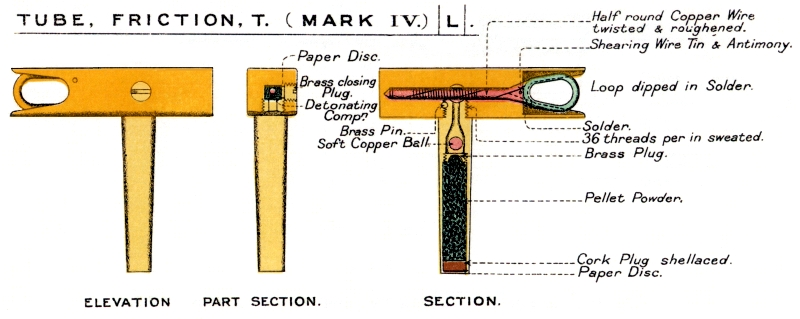
  T Friction tube Mk IV, 1914
- Friction tube – the tube would have a lanyard attached, with length proportional to the size of the gun, which when pulled caused friction inside the tube which ignited a powder charge, much like striking a match. Single-use. Originally of "copper" and "quill" types, replaced by the "T" tube by the late 1890s. They were used in great quantities by field artillery and are found on old British battlefields up to 1904, e.g. in South Africa. They were inserted in a "radial" vent on top of the breech, or later in axial vents running lengthwise through the centre of the breech such as with the BL 15-pounder. The T design, with the friction wire to which the lanyard was attached running through the crosspiece of the T, ensured that when the lanyard was pulled and the gun recoiled the wire was pulled smoothly out of the T piece without exerting force on the vertical part of the T and hence affecting the gas seal.

From 1904, the new generation of field artillery was QF with propellant in brass cases with self-contained percussion primers, while small naval QF cases had self-contained electric primers. From then on, tubes were only used on 60-pounder (5 inch) guns and larger, usually percussion tubes; and for a few small BL guns such as the 2.75-inch mountain gun, usually friction tubes. However, Britain entered World War I with many old BLC 15-pounders which continued to require T tubes until phased out by 1916. To approach a QF rate of fire they used a special "push" version of the T friction tube which was inserted into an axial vent in the breech like a BL percussion tube and fired by a similar mechanism to a firing pin activated by a lever rather than being pulled by a lanyard.

Tubes could also be used with QF cartridges fitted with tube adaptors in place of primers, as with the QF 12-pounder.

== Windage ==
"Windage" as applied to British muzzle-loading ordnance referred to the difference between a gun's bore and the projectile's diameter, typically 0.1–0.2 inches (2.5–5.1 mm). This gap was necessary to allow the projectile to be rammed down the length of the barrel on loading. The word windage was also used for the amount of propellant gas that escaped around the loosely fitting projectile on firing, and hence failed to contribute to accelerating the projectile. Up to half of the gas was lost in this way in old smoothbore artillery. From 1859, Armstrong rifled guns used a deformable lead coating on the projectile to minimise windage and simultaneously to engage the rifling. The elimination of windage necessitated a new design of timed fuze, because the burning propellant gas escaping past the head of the shell had been used to ignite the gunpowder timer train in the fuze in the shell nose. The new fuses used the shock of firing to ignite the timer. When Britain reverted to muzzle-loaders in the late 1860s, projectiles were rotated by studs protruding from the shell body engaging in deep rifling grooves in the barrel, but the windage caused excessive barrel wear. From 1878, after several years of unsuccessful trials, a fairly effective system of concave copper discs called gas-checks was introduced between the charge and projectile; they expanded on firing and sealed the bore. The gas-checks were soon incorporated into the projectile itself and became the driving bands still in use today.

== Wire-wound ==
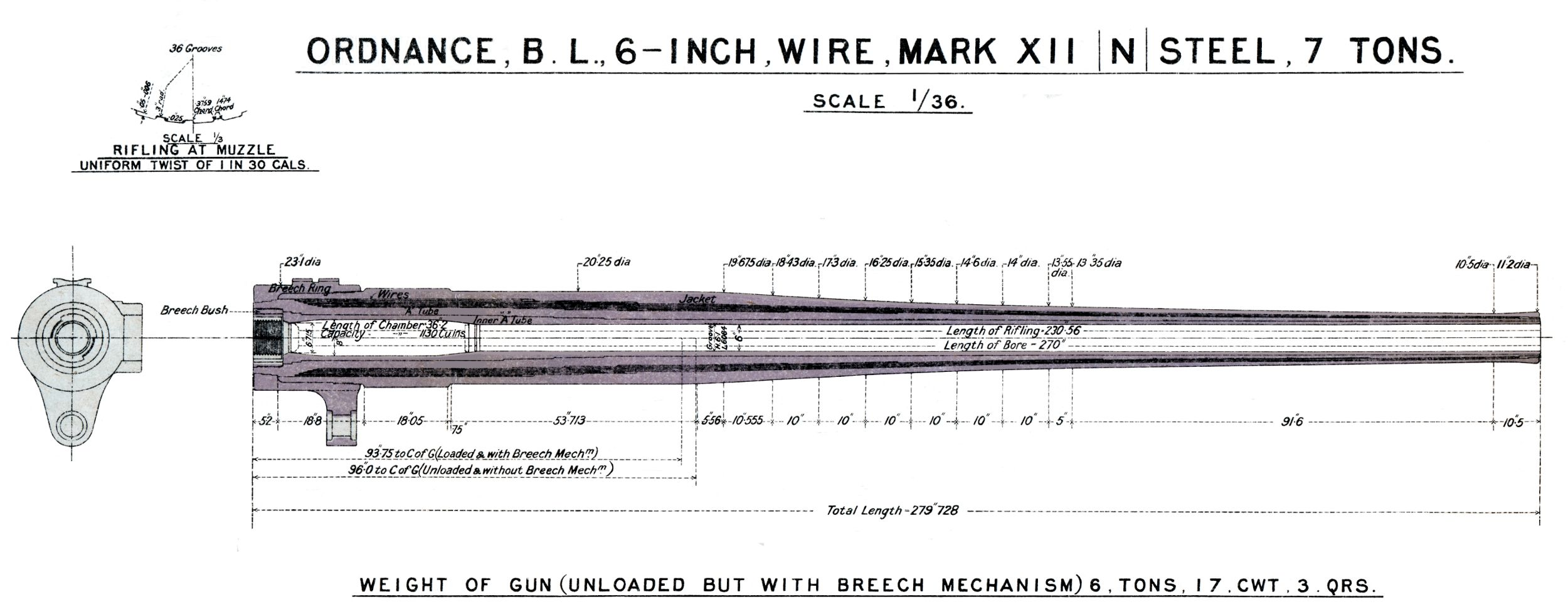
6-inch Mk XII, a typical British wire-wound naval gun introduced in 1914. The wire layer is the dark area

"Wire-wound" or simply "wire" guns were a gun construction method introduced for British naval guns in the 1890s, at which time the strength of large British steel forgings could not be guaranteed in sufficiently large masses to make an all-steel gun of only two or three built-up tubes. One or more central "A" tubes were tightly wound for part or the full length with layers of steel wire, and the wire was covered by a jacket. It was first used on the QF 6-inch Mk II (40 calibre) of 1892, and the first large calibre gun was the BL 12-inch Mk VIII (35 calibre) of 1895. It provided greater radial strength, i.e., it better withstood the gas pressure attempting to expand the gun's diameter, than previous "hoop" construction methods of similar weight. This was necessitated by the introduction of cordite as a propellant in 1892, which generated higher pressures along the length of the barrel than the gunpowder used before. However, it provided less axial strength, i.e. lengthwise rigidity, and early longer wire-wound guns suffered from droop and inaccuracy. A combination of wire and traditional methods was eventually adopted to solve this problem. The successful British wire naval guns of World War I were typically shorter than German and US guns of the same calibre, which did not use wire-wound construction, e.g. British 45 calibres in length, or only 42 calibres in the 15-inch gun, compared to 50 calibres in guns of other countries. The method was found satisfactory for use with field guns and howitzers which had much shorter barrels (as well as much smaller projectiles and much lower "chamber pressures") than naval guns.

With the post-WWI progress in metallurgy, Britain abandoned wire-wound construction for naval guns after the 16-inch Mk I of the 1920s and later 1930s to 1940s designs used monobloc (single-piece) (e.g. 12 pdr 12 cwt Mk V) or built-up all-steel construction (e.g. 6 inch Mk XXIII and 14-inch Mk VII).

== See also ==
- Glossary of firearms terms
- British standard ordnance weights and measurements

== Bibliography ==
- Secretary of State for War (1887). Treatise on Ammunition (4th rev. Corrected to October 1887 ed.). London: Her Majesty's Stationery Office.
- Treatise on Ammunition. facs. repr. (10th Imperial War Museum and Naval & Military Press ed.). War Office. 2003 [1915].
- Hogg, I. V.; Thurston, L. F. (1972). British Artillery Weapons & Ammunition 1914–1918. London: Ian Allan.
