= List of World War II weapons of Norway =

This is a list of Norwegian weapons of World War II. This list will consist of weapons employed by the Norwegian army during the Norwegian campaign or the invasion of Norway by Nazi Germany during World War II. Norwegian resistance weapons have been put in a separate category to avoid confusion with those used by the Norwegian army during the Norwegian campaign.

== Small arms ==
=== Sidearms ===
- Colt Kongsberg M1914 Norwegian licensed production of the American Colt M1911
- Walther P38 Norwegian resistance

=== Rifles ===
- Krag–Jørgensen M1894
- Krag-Petersson reserves
- Kammerlader M1860/67 reserves
- Jarmann M1884 reserves
- Remington M1867 reserves
- Mauser Karabiner 98k Norwegian resistance
- Lee-Enfield Norwegian resistance
- M1 Carbine Norwegian resistance
- M1917 Enfield Norwegian resistance
- M1 Garand Norwegian resistance

=== Submachine guns ===
- Sten Mk 2 Norwegian resistance
- Suomi KP/-31 used by volunteers in Finland
- MP 38 and MP 40 Norwegian resistance

=== Machine guns ===
- Madsen M14 and M29
- Colt M/29 Norwegian licensed production of the American Browning M1917
- Hotchkiss M1914
- Browning M1918A2 Norwegian resistance
- KG m/40
- MG 13
- Eriksen M/25
- MG 34 Norwegian resistance
- Bren Mk II Norwegian resistance

== Artillery ==
=== Field artillery ===
- Ehrhardt 7.5 cm Model 1901

=== Heavy Artillery ===
- Rheinmetall 12 cm leFH 08
- 12 cm felthaubits/m32

=== Mountain artillery ===
- 7.5 cm Gebirgskanone Model 1911
- M.27 (mountain gun)

== Anti-Aircraft weapons ==
- 7.5 cm L/45 M/16 anti aircraft gun
- 7.5 cm L/45 M/32 anti aircraft gun

== Armoured fighting vehicles ==
- Rikstanken(Landsverk L-120 only 1)
- Panserbil M-23 Armored Cars (3)

== Norwegian resistance small arms ==
=== Sidearms ===
- Walther P38

=== Rifles ===
- SMLE
- Mauser Karabiner 98k
- M1 Carbine
- M1917 Enfield
- M1 Garand

=== SMG ===
- Sten MK2 And MK5 (some local copy)
- MP 38 and MP 40

=== Machine guns ===
- Browning M1918A2
- MG 34
- Bren Mk II

==== Grenade ====
- Molotov cocktail
- IED
