= Mountain Artillery Group "Agordo" =

Inactive Italian Army mountain artillery unit

- Gruppo Artiglieria da Montagna "Agordo"
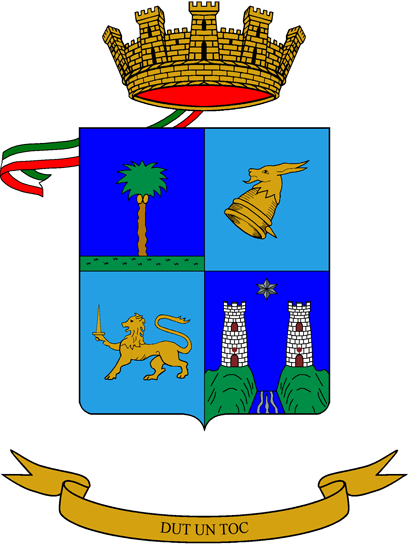
- Group coat of arms
- Active: 11 Nov. 1975 – 26 March 1991
- Country: Italy
- Branch: Italian Army
- Part of: Alpine Brigade "Cadore"
- Garrison/HQ: Bassano del Grappa
- Motto(s): "Dut un toc"
- Anniversaries: 15 June 1918 – Second Battle of the Piave River
- Decorations: 1× Gold Medal of Civil Valor

Insignia
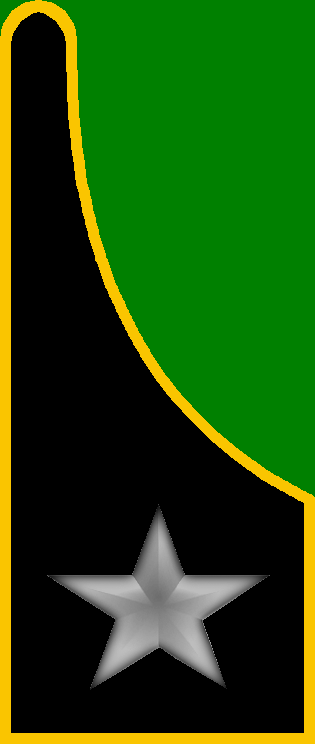
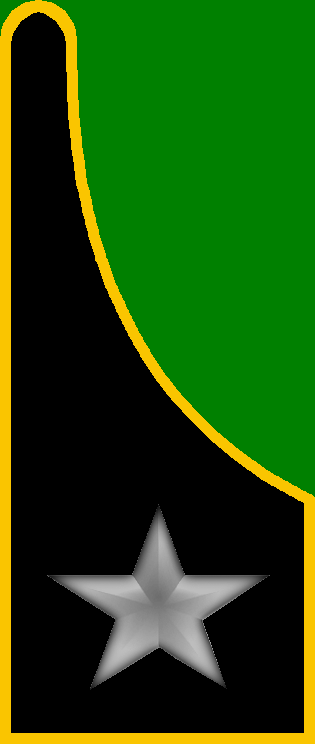
- Regimental gorget patches

The Mountain Artillery Group "Agordo" (Italian: Gruppo Artiglieria da Montagna "Agordo") is an inactive mountain artillery group of the Italian Army, which was based in Bassano del Grappa in Veneto. The group consisted of batteries formed in 1913 in Libya. The batteries were reformed during World War II and assigned to the Alpine Artillery Group "Val Tagliamento", which was assigned in 1943 to the 6th Alpine Artillery Regiment (Italy). The Mountain Artillery Group "Agordo" was formed in 1953 and assigned to the 6th Mountain Artillery Regiment of the Alpine Brigade "Cadore". In 1975 the group became an autonomous unit and was granted a flag and coat of arms. After the end of the Cold War the group was disbanded in 1991.

The Italian mountain artillery has served since its inception alongside the infantry's Alpini speciality, with whom the mountain artillery shares the distinctive Cappello Alpino. The regimental anniversary falls, as for all Italian Army artillery units, on June 15, the beginning of the Second Battle of the Piave River in 1918.

== History ==
=== World War I ===
In 1913 three Royal Italian Army batteries with 70/15 cannons deployed in recently conquered Libya were renumbered and renamed as 41st, 42nd, and 43rd mountain artillery batteries. During World War I the three batteries remained in Libya on occupation duty and were disbanded in 1919 after the war.

=== World War II ===
In 1939 the depot of the 3rd Alpine Artillery Regiment "Julia" in Gorizia formed the Alpine Artillery Group "Val Tagliamento", which consisted of the 41st, 42nd, and 43rd batteries. The group was assigned to the 1st Alpini Group, which was manned by reservists and sent in December 1940 to Albania for the Greco-Italian War. After the war the Alpine Artillery Group "Val Tagliamento" was transferred to Montenegro on occupation duty. In August 1942 the group returned to Italy and in November of the same year it participated in the Axis occupation of Vichy France. On 1 January 1943 the group was assigned to the 6th Alpine Artillery Regiment, which was tasked with coastal defense duties in Liguria. In August 1943 the Alpine Artillery Group "Val Tagliamento" left the regiment and was disbanded, with its personnel and materiel used to help reform the 3rd Alpine Artillery Regiment "Julia", which had been destroyed in January 1943 in the Soviet Union during Operation Little Saturn.

=== Cold War ===
On 1 July 1953 the 6th Mountain Artillery Regiment was reformed in Belluno and was assigned to the Alpine Brigade "Cadore". The regiment included the Mountain Artillery Group "Agordo" with M30 107mm mortars, which had been named for the village of Agordo in the Cadore region. On 15 March 1955 the army's General Staff ordered that also groups with M30 107mm mortars should receive traditional mountain battery numbers and consequently the batteries of the Group "Agordo" received the numbers and traditions of the batteries of the alpine Artillery Group "Val Tagliamento". The group then consisted of the following units:

- Mountain Artillery Group "Agordo"
  - Command Unit
  - 41st Battery, with M30 107mm mortars
  - 42nd Battery, with M30 107mm mortars
  - 43rd Battery, with M30 107mm mortars

In 1956 the Group "Agordo" was equipped with Brandt AM-50 120mm mortars and in April 1957 the group moved to Feltre. On 6 January 1959 the regiment received 105/14 mod. 56 pack howitzers and each of the regiment's three groups now fielded two howitzer and one mortar battery:

- Mountain Artillery Group "Agordo", in Feltre
  - Command Unit
  - 41st Battery, with 105/14 mod. 56 pack howitzers
  - 42nd Battery, with 105/14 mod. 56 pack howitzers
  - 43rd Battery, with Brandt AM-50 120mm mortars

In October 1963 the regiment was called up help mount the rescue operation and cleanup after the Vajont dam disaster. For its work and conduct in the aftermath of the disaster the regiment was awarded a Gold Medal of Civil Valor, which was affixed to the regiment's flag and is depicted on the regiment's coat of arms. On 1 April 1970 the group's mortar batteries was equipped with 105/14 mod. 56 pack howitzers.

During the 1975 army reform the army disbanded the regimental level and newly independent battalions and groups were granted for the first time their own flags. On 15 September 1975 the Mountain Artillery Group "Agordo" in Feltre was disbanded. On 11 November the 6th Mountain Artillery Regiment was disbanded and the next day the Mountain Artillery Group "Pieve di Cadore" in Bassano del Grappa was renamed Mountain Artillery Group "Agordo". The group was assigned to the Alpine Brigade "Cadore" and consisted of a command, a command and services battery, and three batteries with 105/14 mod. 56 pack howitzers, with one of the batteries being mule-carried. At the time the group fielded 610 men (35 officers, 55 non-commissioned officers, and 520 soldiers).

On 12 November 1976 the President of the Italian Republic Giovanni Leone issued decree 846, which granted the Mountain Artillery Group "Agordo" a new flag. On 1 October 1982 the Mountain Artillery Group "Agordo" was equipped with M114 155mm howitzers.

=== Recent times ===
After the end of the Cold War the Italian Army began to draw down its forces. In March 1991 the 42nd and 43rd batteries of the Mountain Artillery Group "Agordo" were disbanded, followed by the command of the group on 26 March. The same day the Mountain Artillery Group "Lanzo" moved from Belluno to Bassano del Grappa and incorporated the 41st Battery. On 10 April of the same year the flag of the Mountain Artillery Group "Agordo" was transferred to the Shrine of the Flags in the Vittoriano in Rome.
