= 6th Mountain Artillery Regiment (Italy) =

Inactive Italian Army mountain artillery unit

- 6° Reggimento artiglieria da Montagna
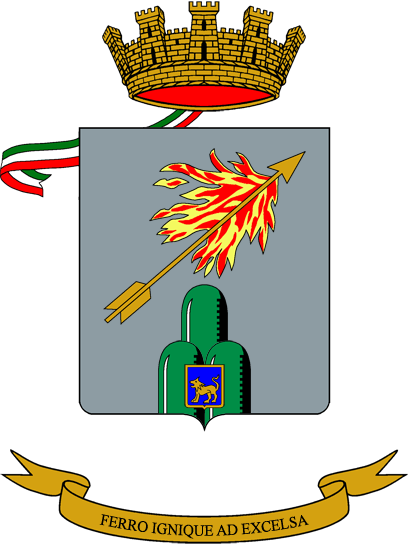
- Regimental coat of arms
- Active: 15 Nov. 1941 – 10 Sept. 1943; 1 July 1953 – 15 July 1995
- Country: Italy
- Branch: Italian Army
- Part of: Alpine Brigade "Cadore"
- Garrison/HQ: Bassano del Grappa
- Motto(s): "Ferro ignique ad excelsa"
- Anniversaries: 15 June 1918 – Second Battle of the Piave River
- Decorations: 1× Gold Medal of Civil Valor

Insignia
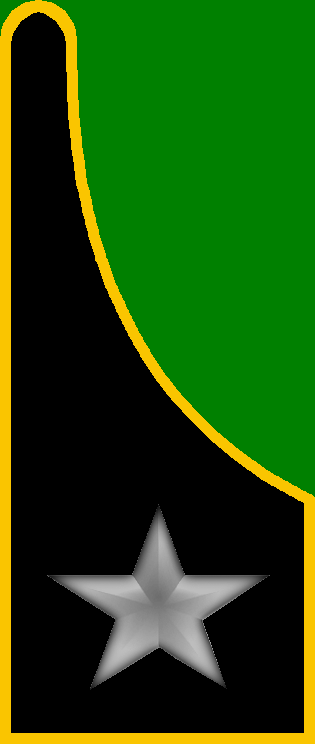
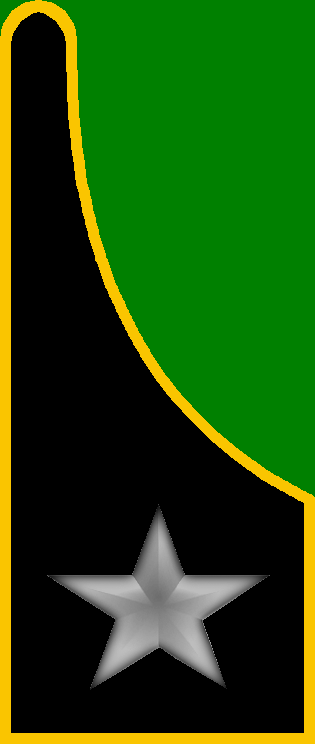
- Regimental gorget patches

The 6th Mountain Artillery Regiment (Italian: 6° Reggimento Artiglieria da Montagna) is an inactive mountain artillery regiment of the Italian Army, which was based in Bassano del Grappa in Veneto. The regiment was formed in 1941 by the Royal Italian Army with batteries that had served in World War I and been disbanded after the war. During World War II the regiment served in 1942 as occupation force in Montenegro and in 1943 in Liguria as coastal defence unit. After the announcement of the Armistice of Cassibile on 8 September 1943 the regiment was disbanded two days later by invading German forces.

The regiment was reformed in 1953 and assigned to the Alpine Brigade "Cadore". In 1975 the regiment was split into two mountain artillery groups and its flag and traditions were assigned to the Mountain Artillery Group "Lanzo". In 1992 the regiment was reformed, but it was disbanded once more in 1995. The Italian mountain artillery has served since its inception alongside the infantry's Alpini speciality, with whom the mountain artillery shares the distinctive Cappello Alpino. The regimental anniversary falls, as for all Italian Army artillery regiments, on June 15, the beginning of the Second Battle of the Piave River in 1918.

== History ==
=== World War II ===
On 15 November 1941 the 6th Alpine Artillery Regiment was formed by the depot of the 1st Alpine Artillery Regiment "Taurinense" in Turin. The regiment consisted of a command, a command unit, the Alpine Artillery Group "Val Chisone", with the batteries 47th, 48th, 49th, and 50th, the Alpine Artillery Group "Val d'Orco", with the batteries 51st, 52nd, and 53rd, and the Alpine Artillery Group "Val d'Adige", with the batteries 75th, 76th, and 77th. The Group "Val d'Adige" had been formed by the depot of the 2nd Alpine Artillery Regiment "Tridentina". All of the regiment's batteries had already been active during World War I and served during that conflict on the Italian front. All three groups were equipped with 75/13 mod. 15 mountain guns.

The regiment was assigned to the 6th Alpine Division "Alpi Graie", which also included the 3rd and 4th Alpine valley groups, which were manned by reservists. The regiment was based in Ivrea, while the Group "Val Chisone" was based in Condorè, the Group "Val d'Orco" in Pallanza, and the Group "Val d'Adige" in Borgomanero. On 9 December 1941 the Group "Val d'Adige" was transferred to Montenegro, where it was tasked with occupation and anti-partisan duties. In January 1942 the Group "Val Chisone" left the regiment, while the Group "Val d'Orco" was transferred to the 3rd Alpine Valley Group. On 27 February 1942 the regiment's command was transferred to Montenegro, where it incorporated the Group "Val d'Adige" and received the Alpine Artillery Group "Valle Isonzo" from the 3rd Alpine Artillery Regiment "Julia". The Group "Valle Isonzo" consisted of the batteries 37th, 38th, and 39th.

While the regiment was in Montenegro the 3rd Alpine Valley Group, which included the Group "Val d'Orco", was reorganized in August 1942 as XX Skiers Grouping. On 3 December 1942 the regiment's command and the Group "Val d'Adige" left Montenegro and by 9 December the units were back at their bases. On 1 January 1943 the regiment received the Alpine Artillery Group "Val Tagliamento" from the 3rd Alpine Artillery Regiment "Julia". The Group "Val Tagliamento" consisted of the batteries 41st, 42nd, and 43rd. The regiment moved to Acqui and was tasked with coastal defense duties in Liguria. In August 1943 the Group "Val Tagliamento" left the regiment, but at the same time the Group "Val Chisone" returned to the regiment. After the announcement of the Armistice of Cassibile on 8 September 1943 the regiment and its groups participated in the defense of the harbour of La Spezia, to allow the Royal Italian Navy ships to escape invading German forces. On 10 September the regiment and its groups were disbanded by the Germans.

=== Cold War ===
On 1 July 1953 the 6th Mountain Artillery Regiment was reformed in Belluno with the personnel of the disbanded 3rd Field Artillery Regiment. On 1 December 1953 regiment was assigned to the Alpine Brigade "Cadore", which also included the 7th Alpini Regiment. The brigade was tasked with defending the Piave valley. The regiment consisted of a command, a command unit, the Mountain Artillery Group "Lanzo" with 75/13 mod. 15 mountain guns, the Mountain Artillery Group "Pieve di Cadore" with 100/17 mod. 14 howitzers, the Mountain Artillery Group "Agordo" with M30 107mm mortars, and a light anti-aircraft group with 40/56 anti-aircraft autocannons. Initially only the Group "Lanzo" consisted of batteries with traditional mountain battery numbers, but on 15 March 1955 the army's General Staff ordered that also the groups with 100/17 mod. 14 howitzers and M30 107mm mortars should receive traditional mountain battery numbers. Consequently all the batteries of the regiment were renumbered and afterwards the regiment consisted of the following groups and batteries:

- 6th Mountain Artillery Regiment, in Belluno
  - Command Unit
  - Mountain Artillery Group "Lanzo"
    - Command Unit
    - 16th and 44th batteries with 75/13 mod. 15 mountain guns
  - Mountain Artillery Group "Pieve di Cadore"
    - Command Unit
    - 37th and 38th batteries with 100/17 mod. 14 howitzers
  - Mountain Artillery Group "Agordo"
    - Command Unit
    - 41st, 42nd, and 43rd batteries with M30 107mm mortars
  - Light Anti-aircraft Group
    - Command Unit
    - 1st, 2nd, and 3rd batteries with 40/56 anti-aircraft autocannons

The Mountain Artillery Group "Lanzo", named for the village of Lanzo near Turin, was formed for the first time as Alpine Artillery Group "Lanzo" in 1935 by the depot of the 1st Alpine Artillery Regiment "Taurinense" in Turin. The group consisted of the 5th, 13th, and 21st batteries, and was assigned on 1 January 1936 to the 5th Alpine Artillery Regiment "Pusteria", with which the group served in the Second Italo-Ethiopian War. After the war the group was disbanded on 12 April 1937. Already on 25 September of the same year the Group "Lanzo" was reformed by the depot of the 5th Alpine Artillery Regiment "Pusteria" and now consisted of the 16th and 21st batteries. In 1938 the group also formed the 44th Battery. During World War II the group participated in the Italian invasion of France, the Greco-Italian War, and the Invasion of Yugoslavia. The group was then sent to Montenegro on occupation duty before being sent to Provence in occupied France in November 1942. There the group was disbanded after the announcement of the Armistice of Cassibile on 8 September 1943. The Mountain Artillery Group "Agordo", named for the village of Agordo in the Cadore region, was formed for the first time in 1953 with the batteries, that had formed the Group "Val Tagliamento" in World War II. The Mountain Artillery Group "Pieve di Cadore", named for the village of Pieve di Cadore in the Cadore region, was formed for the first time in 1953 with batteries that had served with the "Valle Isonzo" and "Val Chisone" groups in World War II.

On 31 December 1955 the Light Anti-aircraft Group was transferred to the 2nd Heavy Anti-aircraft Artillery Regiment. In 1956 the Group "Agordo" was equipped with Brandt AM-50 120mm mortars. In 1956–57 the regiment formed the 47th Battery for the Group "Lanzo" and the 50th Battery for the Group "Pieve di Cadore". In April 1957 the Group "Pieve di Cadore" moved to Strigno, while the Group "Agordo" moved to Feltre. On 6 January 1959 the regiment received 105/14 mod. 56 pack howitzers and each of the three groups now fielded two howitzer and one mortar battery. In February 1963 the Group "Pieve di Cadore" moved from Strigno to Bassano del Grappa.

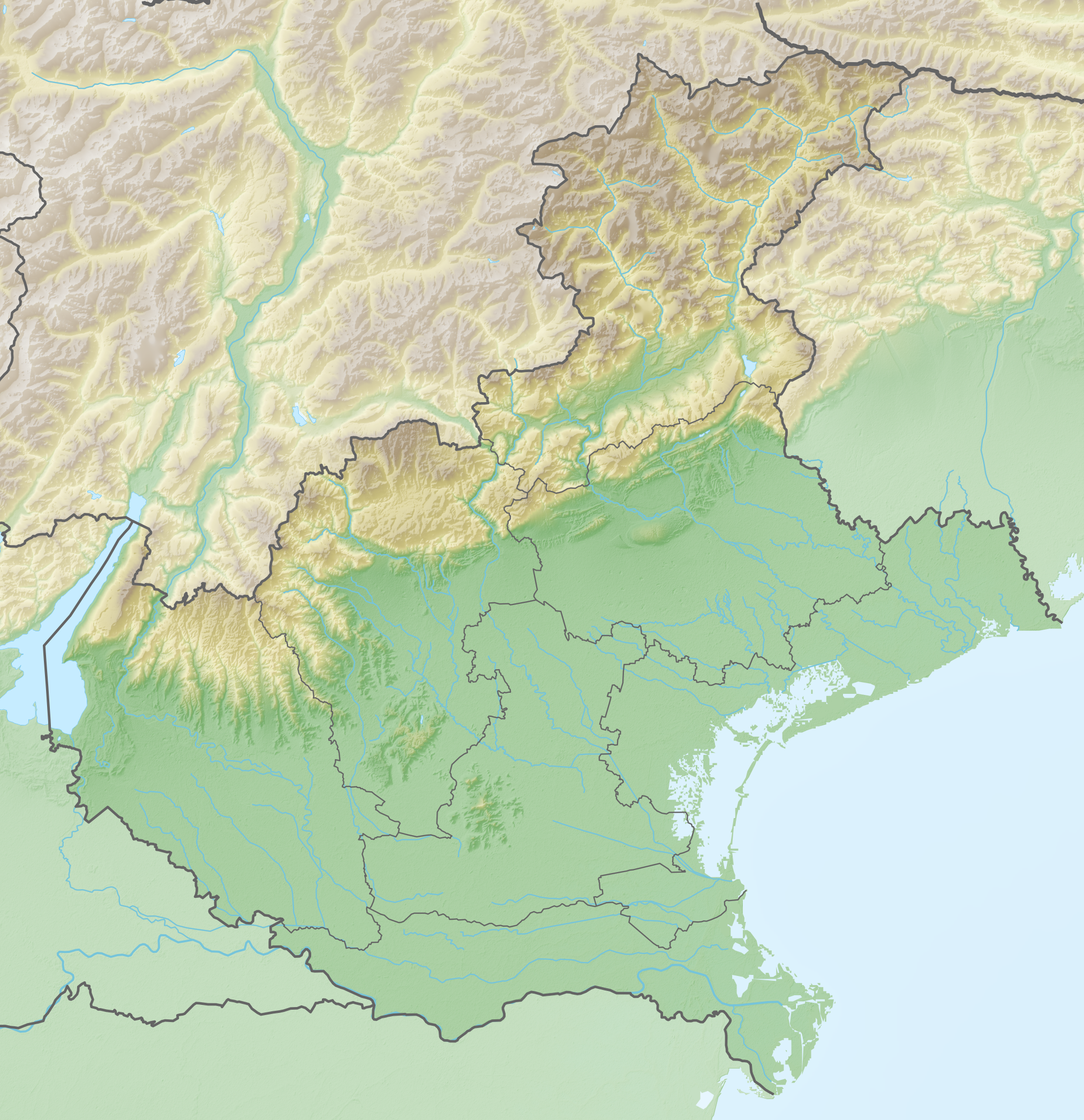
Location of the regiment and its groups in Veneto at the end of 1964
- 6th Mountain Artillery Regiment, in Belluno
  - Command Unit
  - Mountain Artillery Group "Lanzo", in Belluno
    - Command Unit
    - 16th Battery, with 105/14 mod. 56 pack howitzers
    - 44th Battery, with 105/14 mod. 56 pack howitzers
    - 47th Battery, with Brandt AM-50 120mm mortars
  - Mountain Artillery Group "Pieve di Cadore", in Bassano del Grappa
    - Command Unit
    - 37th Battery, with 105/14 mod. 56 pack howitzers
    - 38th Battery, with 105/14 mod. 56 pack howitzers
    - 50th Battery, with Brandt AM-50 120mm mortars
  - Mountain Artillery Group "Agordo", in Feltre
    - Command Unit
    - 41st Battery, with 105/14 mod. 56 pack howitzers
    - 42nd Battery, with 105/14 mod. 56 pack howitzers
    - 43rd Battery, with Brandt AM-50 120mm mortars

In October 1963 the regiment was called up help mount the rescue operation and cleanup after the Vajont dam disaster. For its work and conduct in the aftermath of the disaster the regiment was awarded a Gold Medal of Civil Valor, which was affixed to the regiment's flag and is depicted on the regiment's coat of arms. On 1 April 1970 the regiment's mortar batteries were equipped with 105/14 mod. 56 pack howitzers.

During the 1975 army reform the army disbanded the regimental level and newly independent battalions and groups were granted for the first time their own flags. On 15 September 1975 the Group "Agordo" in Feltre was disbanded. On 11 November the 6th Mountain Artillery Regiment was disbanded and the next day the Mountain Artillery Group "Pieve di Cadore" in Bassano del Grappa was renamed Mountain Artillery Group "Agordo". The same day the Mountain Artillery Group "Agordo" in Bassano del Grappa and the Mountain Artillery Group "Lanzo" in Belluno became autonomous units and were assigned to the Alpine Brigade "Cadore". Both groups consisted of a command, a command and services battery, and three batteries with 105/14 mod. 56 pack howitzers, with one of the batteries being mule-carried. At the time each of the two groups fielded 610 men (35 officers, 55 non-commissioned officers, and 520 soldiers).

On 12 November 1976 the President of the Italian Republic Giovanni Leone issued decree 846, which assigned the flag and traditions of the 6th Mountain Artillery Regiment to the Mountain Artillery Group "Lanzo", and granted the Mountain Artillery Group "Agordo" a new flag. On 1 October 1982 the Mountain Artillery Group "Agordo" was equipped with M114 155mm howitzers.

=== Recent times ===
After the end of the Cold War the Italian Army began to draw down its forces. In March 1991 the 42nd and 43rd batteries of the Mountain Artillery Group "Agordo" were disbanded, followed on 26 March by the command of the group. The same day the Mountain Artillery Group "Lanzo" moved from Belluno to Bassano del Grappa and incorporated the 41st Battery of the Mountain Artillery Group "Agordo". On 10 April of the same year the flag of the Mountain Artillery Group "Agordo" was transferred to the Shrine of the Flags in the Vittoriano in Rome. Afterwards the 41st Battery was reorganized as a self-defense anti-aircraft battery, which was equipped with Stinger man-portable air-defense systems. On 11 September 1992 the Mountain Artillery Group "Lanzo" lost its autonomy and the next day entered the reformed 6th Mountain Artillery Regiment. The regiment consisted of the following units:

- 6th Mountain Artillery Regiment, in Bassano del Grappa
  - Command and Services Battery
  - 41st Self-defense Anti-aircraft Battery, with Stinger man-portable air-defense systems
  - Group "Lanzo"
    - 16th Battery, with 105/14 mod. 56 pack howitzers
    - 44th Battery, with 105/14 mod. 56 pack howitzers
    - 47th Battery, with 105/14 mod. 56 pack howitzers

On 15 July 1995 the regiment was disbanded and on 3 August of the same year the flag of the 6th Mountain Artillery Regiment was transferred to the Shrine of the Flags in the Vittoriano in Rome.
