= Battle of Høljarast Bridge =

1940 Nazi victory in Norway during WWII

- Part of the Norwegian campaign in World War II
Date	24 April 1940
Location	Etnedal Municipality, Norway
Result	German victory: German advance to Tonsåsen; Høljarast Bridge destroyed; Norwegians successfully withdraw

Belligerents
Norway	Germany

Commanders and leaders
(Norway) Maj. Sæter	(Nazi Germany) Maj. Daubert

Units involved
(Norway) 10th Infantry Regiment: 2nd Battalion	Unknown

Casualties and losses
Unknown	Unknown

The Battle of Høljarast Bridge was a military engagement between Norwegian and German forces during the Norwegian Campaign. The battle ended with a partial Norwegian defeat as they were unable to hold their lines against German advance. Norwegians managed to withdraw in order destroying the strategic bridge so Germans would not be able to use it. Germans soon built an improvised bridge in the same place they named "Brandenburg".

== See also ==
- List of Norwegian military equipment of World War II
- List of German military equipment of World War II
