= List of Norwegian military equipment of World War II =

This is a list of Norwegian military equipment of World War II. This list will mainly focus on the equipment of the Norwegian army during the Norwegian campaign or World War II invasion of Norway by Nazi Germany. For Norwegian resistance or other Norwegian forces after the German occupation of Norway please put them under different headers to differentiate them or put them in a different list.

== Weapons ==
- List of World War II weapons of Norway

== Aircraft ==
- List of aircraft of Norway in World War II
