= M27 =

M27, M.27 or M-27 may refer to:

== In science ==
- Messier 27, a planetary nebula also called the Dumbbell Nebula

== In firearms and military equipment ==
- M27 Mosin–Nagant, a Finnish rifle
- M27 Infantry Automatic Rifle, a squad automatic weapon developed for the U.S. Marine Corps
- M27 link, a disintegrating 5.56×45mm NATO bullet link used in belt fed firearms
- M.27 (mountain gun), a Norwegian mountain gun used in World War II
- M27 tank, a rejected US World War II medium tank design

== In transportation ==
- M27 motorway, a road connecting Cadnam and Portsmouth in Hampshire
- M27 highway (Russia), a road connecting Novorossiysk and the border with Georgia
- M-27 (Michigan highway), a road connecting I-75 near Indian River and US 23 and C-66 in Cheboygan
- Manitoba Highway 27, a road connecting PTH 8 (McPhillips Rd.) and PTH 9 (Main St.)
- M27 (Johannesburg), a Metropolitan Route in Johannesburg, South Africa
- M27 (Pretoria), a Metropolitan Route in Pretoria, South Africa
- M27 (Durban), a Metropolitan Route in Durban, South Africa
