= M.27 (mountain gun) =

75 mm M.27
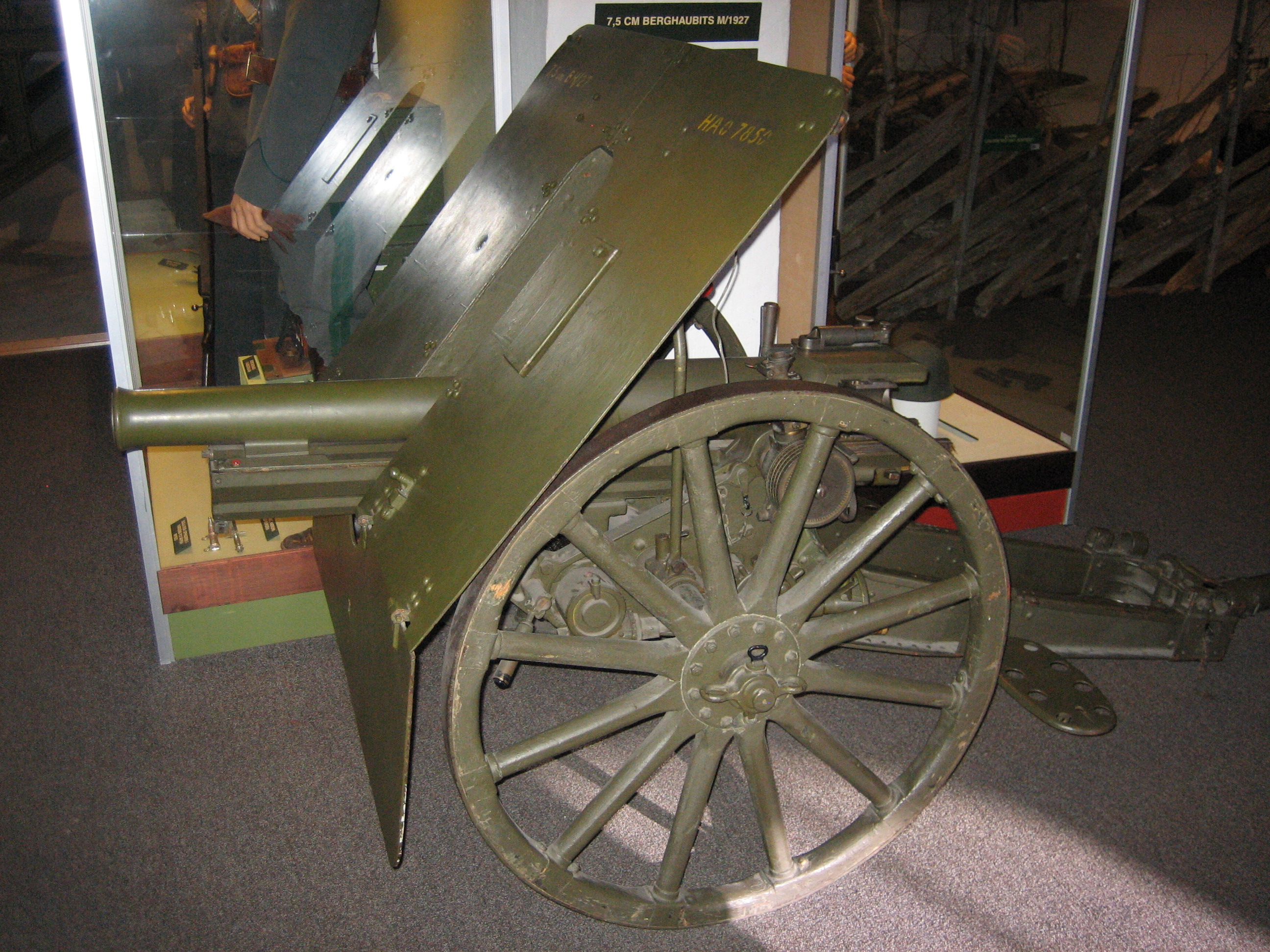
- Type: Mountain gun
- Place of origin: Norway

Service history
- In service: 1927-1940
- Used by: Norway
- Wars: World War II

Production history
- Designer: Kongsberg
- Manufacturer: Kongsberg
- No. built: 24

Specifications
- Mass: 600 kg (1,300 lb)
- Barrel length: 1.53 m (5 ft) L/20.5
- Shell: 6.5 kilograms (14 lb)
- Caliber: 75 mm (2.95 in)
- Carriage: Split trail
- Elevation: -5° to +47°
- Traverse: 5°
- Muzzle velocity: 395 m/s (1,296 ft/s)
- Maximum firing range: 8,800 m (9,600 yd)

The 75 mm M.27 was a Norwegian mountain gun used in World War II. Twenty-four of these guns were designed and built by Kongsberg Kanonfabrik to supplement the old 75mm Ehrhardt M.11 guns. There is no record of any use by Nazi Germany after the Norwegian Campaign
