= List of aircraft of Norway in World War II =

This is a list of Norwegian World War II aircraft. This list will show all the aircraft in use by the Norwegian Army Air Service(normal aircraft) and Royal Norwegian Navy Air Service(naval aircraft) during the Norwegian campaign or the World War II invasion of Norway by Nazi Germany.

== Fighters ==
- Armstrong Whitworth Scimitar(non-operational)
- Gloster Gladiator
- Curtiss P-36 Hawk(non-operational)
- Supermarine Spitfire The Army and Navy air services established themselves in Britain under the command of the Joint Chiefs of Staff. Norwegian air and ground crews operated as part of the British Royal Air Force, in both wholly Norwegian squadrons and also in other squadrons and units such as RAF Ferry Command and RAF Bomber Command. In particular, Norwegian personnel operated two squadrons of Supermarine Spitfires: RAF 132 (Norwegian) Wing consisted of No. 331 (Norwegian) Squadron and RAF No. 332 (Norwegian) Squadron. Both planes and running costs were financed by the exiled Norwegian government.

== Bombers ==
- Fokker C.V
- Northrop N-3PB Nomad - Flown by Norwegian forces and were stationed at Reykjavík, Iceland performing anti-submarine and convoy escort duties.

== Torpedo bombers ==
- Douglas DT
- Heinkel He 115

== Reconnaissance ==
- Caproni Ca.310

== Naval reconnaissance ==
- Marinens Flyvebaatfabrikk M.F.11
- Breda Ba.28(variant of Ba.25)
- Arado Ar 196(1 captured in invasion)

== Trainers ==
- De Havilland DH.60 Moth
- De Havilland Tiger Moth

== Naval trainers ==
- Marinens Flyvebaatfabrikk M.F.10
