= Eriksen M/25 =

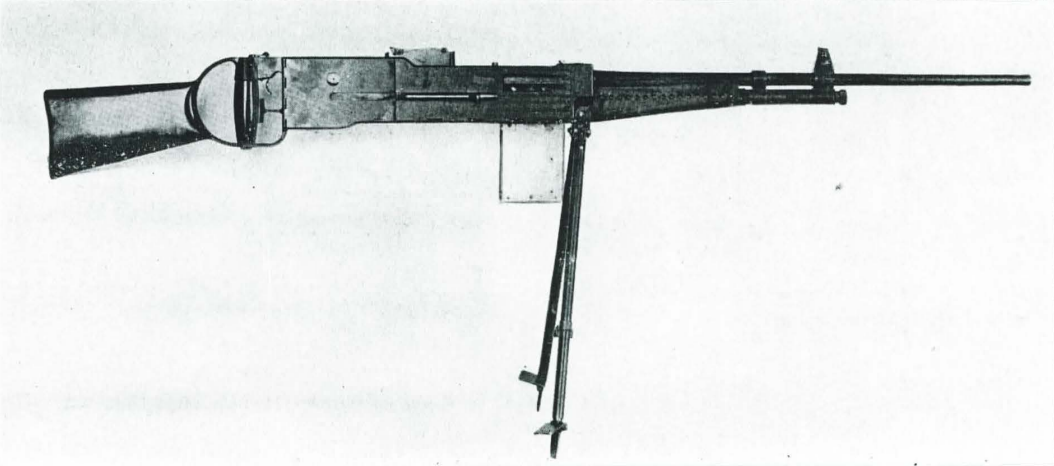
- The Eriksen M/25 during British trials in 1927
- Type: Light machine gun
- Place of origin: Norway

Service history
- In service: 1940
- Used by: Norwegian Army
- Wars: World War II

Production history
- Designer: Johan Emil Barbat Eriksen
- Designed: 1925
- Variants: Prototype version

Specifications
- Mass: 14.4 kg (32 lb) (Without magazine)
- Length: 138 cm (54 in)
- Barrel length: 66.5 cm (26.2 in)
- Cartridge: 6.5×55mm
- Feed system: 50-round box magazine (10x5 rounds in stripper clips)

The Eriksen M/25 was a prototype light machine gun designed and built by the Norwegian gunsmith Johan Emil Barbat Eriksen in 1925. A single prototype of the weapon was manufactured and saw service with the Norwegian Army during the Norwegian Campaign in 1940.

== Design details ==
Johan Emil Barbat Eriksen was employed by the Norwegian armaments factory Kongsberg Våpenfabrikk and worked on several automatic weapon projects in his spare time, one of which was the Eriksen M/25.

The Eriksen M/25 was 138 cm (54 in) long, with a barrel length of 66.5 cm (26.2 in). It weighed 14.4 kg (32 lb) and fired 6.5×55mm rounds. The rate of fire is unknown.

The design of the action of the weapon combined functions of several different machine guns of the same era. The action consisted of a sliding breech block connected to a rotary crank, which in turn was operated by an off-set connecting rod, driven by the piston rod of the weapon. The feeding system was also unconventional, utilizing a box magazine mounted on the left side of the gun, holding 10 stripper clips with five rounds each. The stripper clips were fed one at a time through the gun from left to right where the empty clips were ejected, not unlike the Japanese Type 11 light machine gun which utilised a similar feature. It used the rear sight and the barrel of the Krag–Jørgensen rifle.

== Operational use ==
A prototype of the design was built in 1925, and was probably the only unit ever manufactured. It was sent to the British Committee of Investigation of Small Arms for trials in 1927, but did not receive approval. The British showed limited interest in the weapon from the outset, decided against procuring 6.5×55mm ammunition, and thus limited their testing to examination of the prototype without test firing. Eriksen patented his inventions in the United Kingdom.

The prototype was used by the Norwegian Army fighting German forces in the Norwegian Campaign in 1940. This specific weapon was issued to Sergeant Håkon Lunde on 14 April 1940 when he was mobilized at Raufoss, and he carried it for several days before hiding it in Oslo. The gun remained hidden until the end of the Second World War in Europe in May 1945, when Lunde brought it back to his house and kept it.

In 1996 Lunde gave the Eriksen M/25 prototype to the Royal Norwegian Navy Museum, which refurbished and exhibited it. The magazine for the weapon was lost before the gun was donated to the museum.

== Bibliography ==
- Antonsen, Askild (2014). Skytevåpen benyttet av Forsvaret etter 1859. Forsvarsmuseets skrifter, no. 13 (in Norwegian). Oslo: Armed Forces Museum. ISBN 8291218633.
- Flatby, Tom; Myrvang, Folke (2008). Norske mitraljøser og maskingeværer: Hotchkiss, Madsen og Colt (in Norwegian). Haslum: Tom Flatby og Folke Myrvang. ISBN 978-82-303-1122-6.
