= 7.5 cm L/45 M/32 anti aircraft gun =

Norwegian artillery of the 1930s

7.5 cm L/45 M/32
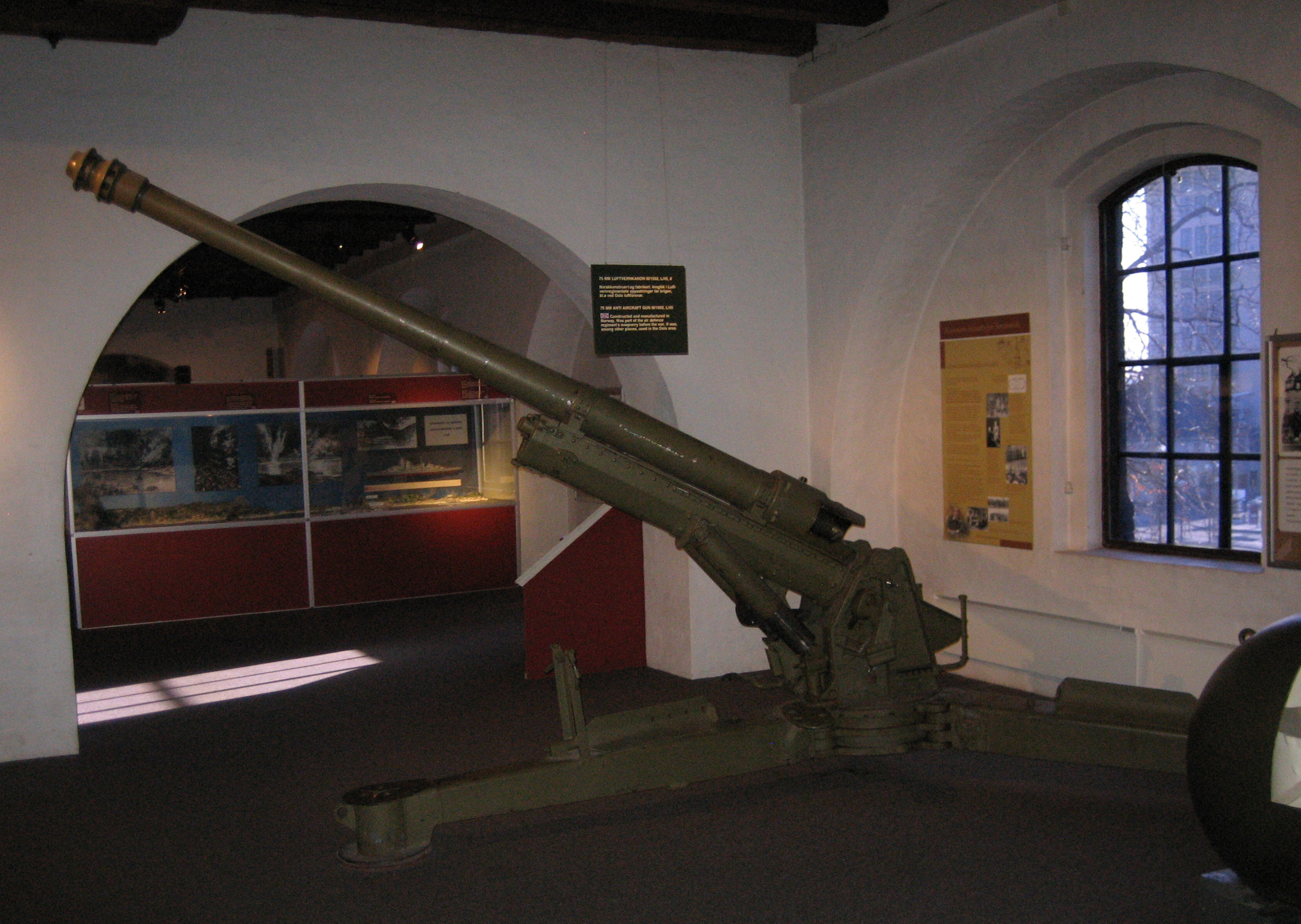
- A 7.5 cm L/45 M/32 anti-aircraft gun on display at the Norwegian Armed Forces Museum in Oslo, October 2008
- Type: Anti-aircraft gun
- Place of origin: Norway

Service history
- In service: 1936–1940
- Used by: Norway
- Wars: World War II: Norwegian Campaign; German occupation of Norway

Production history
- Designed: 1932
- Produced: 1932–1940

Specifications
- Mass: 1,960 kg (4,320 lb)
- Barrel length: 3.4 m (11 ft 2 in) L/45
- Shell: HE and shrapnel
- Shell weight: 6.5 kg (14 lb 5 oz)
- Caliber: 75 mm (3.0 in)
- Carriage: Tripod
- Elevation: 0° to +85°
- Traverse: 360°
- Muzzle velocity: 750 m/s (2,500 ft/s)
- Effective firing range: 9.5 km (31,000 ft) AA ceiling

The 7.5 cm L/45 M/32 anti-aircraft gun was designed and manufactured in Norway in the 1930s. The mount was an unusual design, having a platform with three outriggers instead of the usual four. Its main use was for positional air defence of important cities and installations.

== Background and design ==
Around 1930 it became clear that a more modern anti-aircraft gun than the M/16, which had been designed in the latter half of World War I, was needed. A number of 76 mm anti-aircraft guns had been bought from Bofors in 1928, but were no more modern than the M/16.

In 1932 a new and innovative anti-aircraft gun was designed. Partly based on the M/16, it was mounted on a low-slung trailer with three outriggers. Two of them folded together for transportation, and two rubber wheels could be mounted. The outriggers could be adjusted in elevation to a limited extent to help place the mount in a horizontal position. The mount allowed for a 360° traverse and an elevation between 0° and 85°. The gun had a muzzle brake to reduce recoil, a hydro-pneumatic recoil cylinder and a gas cylinder to aid the forward movement of the barrel at high elevations. In addition the mount had two heavy springs to counterbalance the barrel, as the entire barrel was mounted ahead of the pivots. It (the barrel), was 45 calibres long and had 28 grooves (rifling) twisting to the right - like the M/16's barrel. The breech block was also similar to the M/16: a semi-automatic horizontal-wedge that the gunner had to open manually to remove the case from the previous shot, but which closed automatically on insertion of a new round.

Like late models of the M/16, the M/32 was equipped to receive gun-laying information from a central sight, and also had a device for automatically adjusting the timing of the fuses on the shells.

== Service history and fate ==
The M/32, first issued to units of the Norwegian Army in 1936, was well liked. First used at the anti-aircraft school based at Stavern, guns were also issued to the units responsible for defending Oslo and Raufoss. It remained in Norwegian service until the Germans invaded Norway on 9 April 1940.

At Raufoss, a total of four M/32s were installed in two batteries. After observing several aircraft out of the guns' range, one of the units was sent to Elverum Municipality to protect the Parliament and the King. These two guns were destroyed and abandoned when the battery retreated. The remaining two-gun unit at Raufoss fired at aircraft in the evening of 9 April, with no visible result. After several days, the battery was moved to Dombås, where one of the guns was damaged while being set up. At Dombås the last M/32 was used to engage German paratroopers on the ground, leading to the surrender of the German force, as well as firing at German bombers with unknown results.

In Oslo, the M/32 was installed in four batteries of three guns each. These units were well equipped, by contemporary Norwegian standards, with central sights, range and height finders. When the Germans attacked Oslo, the batteries all took part in the defensive battle. In spite of a lack of ammunition, unreliable fuses, electrical batteries that discharged too quickly, central sights that fell apart due to the shock waves from firing, lack of training and more. The batteries claimed to have shot down five or six German aircraft. However, after reviewing the Luftwaffe's own reports and the number of wrecked aircraft in the Oslo area on 9 April, researchers have concluded that probably only one German aircraft was shot down by ground-based air defence. A number of aircraft were hit, some very seriously, but only one seems to have crashed as a result. The guns were abandoned when Oslo surrendered due to the threat of German bombing of civilians.

The fate of the M/32s after the Germans captured Norway is unknown, but they probably used them for air defence in Norway. Today one is preserved at the Norwegian Armed Forces Museum in Oslo.
