= 7.5 cm Gebirgskanone Model 1911 =

Ehrhardt 7.5 cm Model 1911
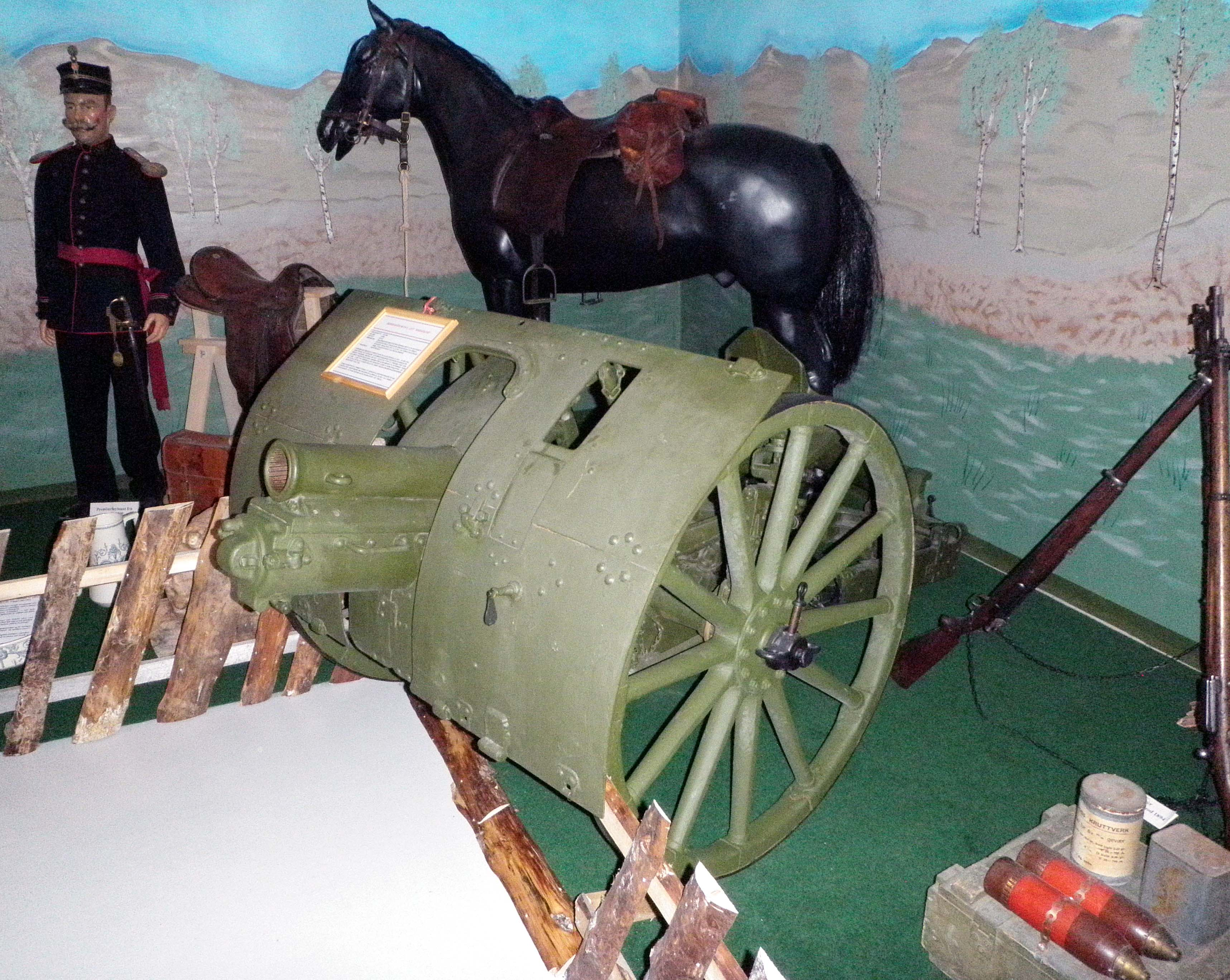
- Model 1911 on display in Setermoen, Norway.
- Type: Mountain gun
- Place of origin: German Empire

Service history
- Used by: Norway; Nazi Germany

Production history
- Designer: Rheinmetall
- Manufacturer: Rheinmetall
- Produced: 1911

Specifications
- Mass: 509 kg (1,122 lb)
- Barrel length: 1.2 m (3 ft 11 in) L/17
- Shell weight: 6.5 kg (14 lb 5 oz)
- Caliber: 75 mm (2.95 in)
- Elevation: -5° to 36°
- Traverse: 6°
- Muzzle velocity: 315 m/s (1,033 ft/s)
- Maximum firing range: 6,900 m (7,500 yd)

The 7.5 cm Gebirgskanone Model 1911 was a mountain gun manufactured for export in 1911 by the German firm Rheinmetall. Nine batteries were sold to Norway. During the 1940 Norwegian campaign, a number of these were captured by the Germans, who designated them 7.5 cm GebK 247(n). The crew were protected by an armoured shield.

== See also ==
- List of mountain artillery
