= 7.5 cm L/45 M/16 anti aircraft gun =

7.5 cm L/45 M/16
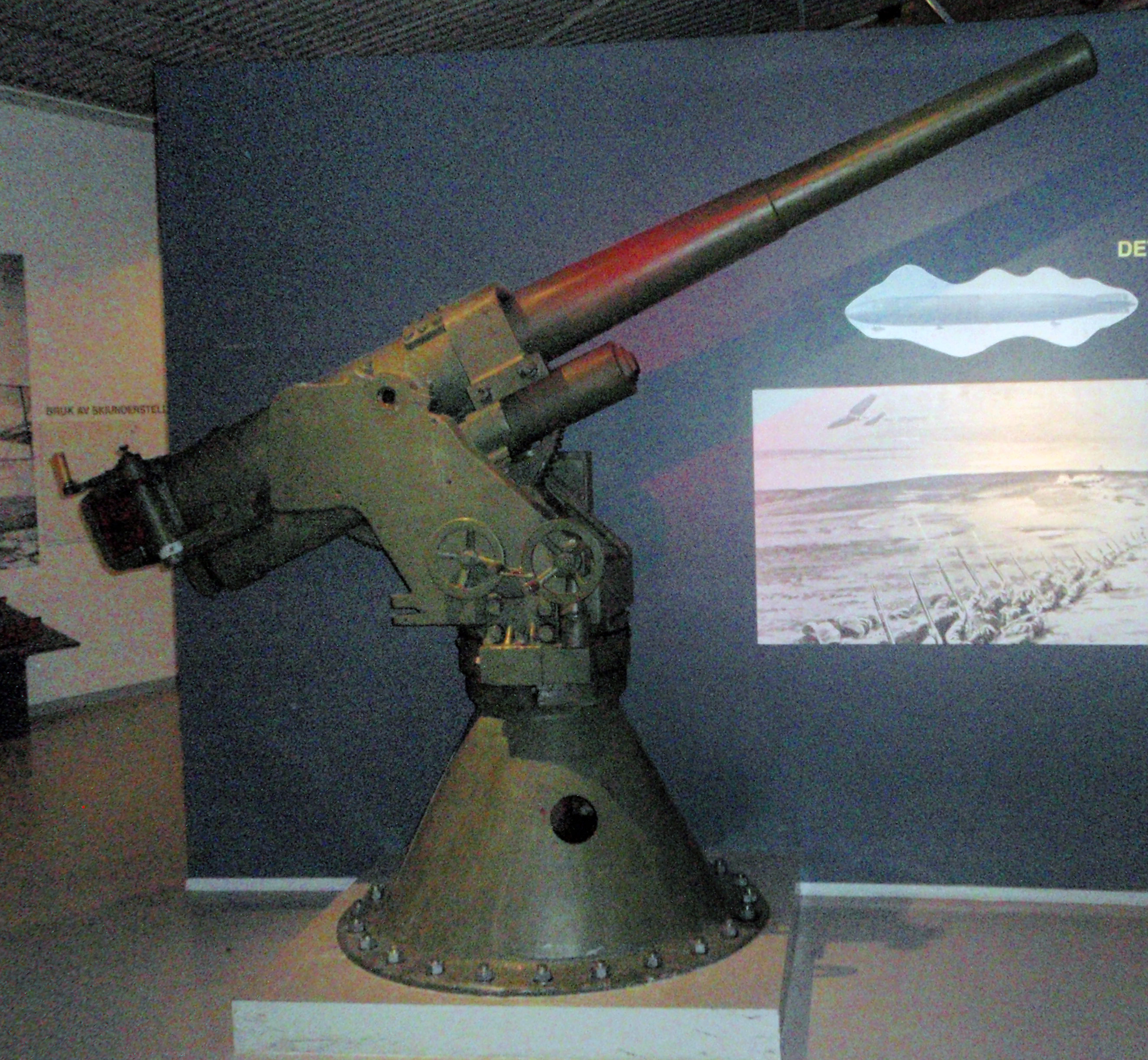
- M/16 at the Norwegian Aviation Museum in Bodø
- Type: Anti aircraft gun
- Place of origin: Norway

Service history
- In service: 1925–1940
- Used by: Norway
- Wars: World War II: Norwegian Campaign; German occupation of Norway

Production history
- Produced: 1920 -
- No. built: 12 + 1

Specifications
- Mass: ??
- Barrel length: 45
- Crew: 9
- Shell: HE and shrapnel
- Caliber: 75 mm
- Carriage: Static
- Elevation: -1 to 75 degrees
- Traverse: 360 degrees
- Rate of fire: ??
- Muzzle velocity: 750 m/s
- Effective firing range: 8000 m

The 7.5 cm L/45 M/16 anti-aircraft gun was designed and manufactured in Norway in the early to mid-1920s. It was an uninspired design, but it did boost the anti-aircraft capacity in Norway significantly when adopted.

== Background and design ==
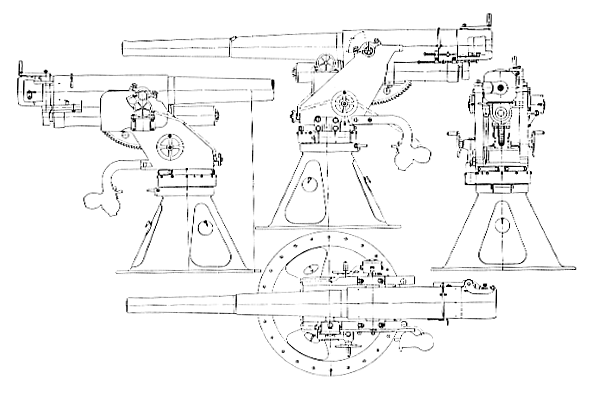
The patent drawing of the 7.5 cm L/45 M/16 anti-aircraft gun

Early in World War I, the Norwegian Army realised that aircraft were a threat that needed to be countered. At first, attempts were made to mount existing field guns on new mounts to allow high angle fire, but it was soon obvious that a more specialised weapon was needed. Attempts were made to buy British and French guns, but both nations needed the weapons themselves because of the ongoing war.

The history of the M/16 can be traced to a letter from the Norwegian Ministry of Defence dated 17 December 1915. After initial design work had been carried out, it was decided to manufacture one prototype and 12 production weapons. The detailed design work took longer than anticipated, and with the end of the war, any urgency seemed to leave the project. As a result, the prototype was not ready for test firing until 20 May 1920.

The M/16 was a relatively simple design. It was intended for static emplacement, and was mounted on a pedestal, allowing for 360° sideways movement. The mount allowed for an angle of elevation of between -1° and 75°. The gun barrel was 45 calibres long, and had 28 grooves (rifling) twisting to the right. The breech block was a semi-automatic horizontal-wedge - the gunner had to manually open it to remove the case from the previous shot, but it closed automatically on the insertion of a new round. There was a Hydro-pneumatic recoil cylinder under the barrel, with a heavy spring to aid the forward motion of the gun at high elevation. It was originally designed to fire under local command, but was later equipped to receive gun-laying information from a central sight.

The gun was also equipped with a device for automatically adjusting the time fuses on the shells.

The M/16 was served by a crew of nine: The gun commander, one soldier for sideways adjustment, one for adjusting the elevation, one to operate the breech block and fire, one loader, one 'fuse adjusting device operator', one 'fuse adjuster' and two to fetch ammunition and take away the empty cases.

== Service history and fate ==
A total of 12 production guns were built. Further production was curtailed because of the perceived low risk of war in the 1920s; by the time the need for more anti-aircraft artillery was obvious in the 1930s, the design was outdated.

The M/16 was employed in the static defence of the various military installations in Norway. The weapons were moved around as priorities shifted, but at the time the Germans invaded Norway on 9 April 1940, six guns were mounted near Bergen, four were mounted at the Naval base in Horten; the remaining two were near Oslo along with more modern weapons, such as the 7.5 cm L/45 M/32, to defend the capital.

The guns at Horten could have taken part in the battle that occurred in the harbour between Norwegian and German ships (see the article on HNoMS Olav Tryggvason for details), but due to unclear lines of command and the unprepared state of the crew, the guns were captured before any shots could be fired in anger.

In Bergen, the M/16 was used to try to shoot down German bombers attacking military targets, but the aircraft flew too low for the guns to be of much use. After the main fortification in Bergen surrendered to the Germans, the anti-aircraft batteries were ordered to stand down.

In Oslo, the two M/16s were mounted in a battery at Gressholmen - a small island in the harbour - and were ideally placed to take part in the battle for Fornebu. Norwegian sources claim this battery shot down one or two German bombers, despite the fact that the crew was untrained (17 out of the 44 men had been in uniform for only six days) and several became shell-shocked or deserted their posts. In addition to this and other problems, one of the guns jammed early-on in the engagement.

The fate of the M/16s after the Germans captured them is unknown, but it is likely they were used to further the German cause in Norway during their occupation of Norway.
