= OTO Melara Mod 56 =

Italian-made 105 mm pack howitzer

OTO Melara Model 56/14 pack howitzer
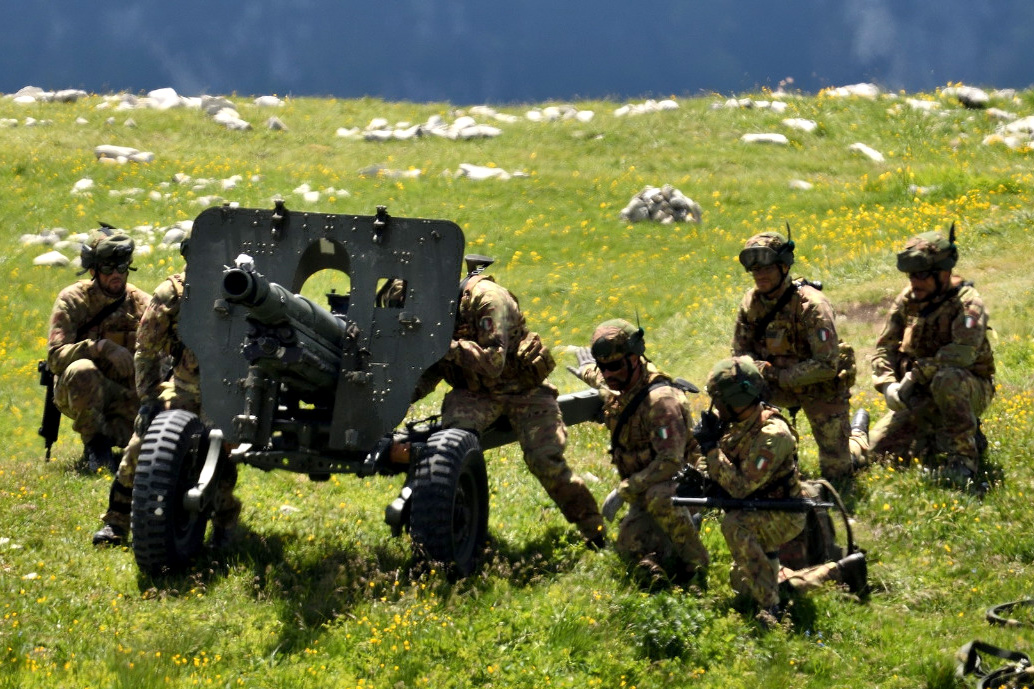
- Italian mountain artillery troops with a Mod 56 in the Dolomites
- Type: Pack howitzer
- Place of origin: Italy

Service history
- In service: 1957–present
- Used by: See Operators

Production history
- Designer: OTO Melara
- Designed: 1955–1956
- No. built: 2,500+

Specifications
- Mass: 1,290 kg (2,840 lb)
- Length: 3.65 m (12 ft 0 in)
- Barrel length: 1.47 m (4 ft 9.9 in) L/14
- Width: 1.5 m (4 ft 11.1 in)
- Height: 1.9 m (6 ft 2.8 in)
- Crew: 7
- Shell: Semi-fixed 105 x 372 mm R
- Shell weight: 14.9 kg (33 lb)
- Calibre: 105 mm (4.13 in)
- Breech: Vertical sliding-block
- Recoil: Hydro-pneumatic
- Carriage: Split trail
- Elevation: -7° to +65°
- Traverse: 56°
- Rate of fire: Maximum: 8 rpm for short periods Sustained: 4 rpm for 30 minutes
- Muzzle velocity: 416 m/s (1,360 ft/s)
- Maximum firing range: 10,000 m (10,900 yd)

The OTO Melara Mod 56 is an Italian-made 105 mm pack howitzer built and developed by OTO Melara. It fires the standard US type M1 ammunition.

== History ==
The OTO Melara 105 mm Mod 56 began life in the 1950s to meet the requirement for a modern light-weight howitzer that could be used by the Italian Army's Alpini brigades mountain artillery regiments. That it remained in service with those units a full half century after its introduction is a testament to the gun's quality. The Mod 56 has a number of unique characteristics for a weapon of its caliber, including the ability for its crew to manhandle the gun (due to its light weight), and the capability of being used in the direct fire role. Being a pack howitzer, it is designed to be broken down into 12 parts, each of which can be transported easily.

Its ability to be "knocked-down" allows the sections to be transported a number of ways, although the original design was for mule-pack using special pack saddles. More often it is towed by a light vehicle such as a jeep or Land Rover. With the shield removed it can be carried inside an M113 armored personnel carrier. Its particular attraction to Western armies in the 1960s was that its light weight meant it could be lifted in one piece by helicopter, which made the gun popular with light artillery units in many countries as well as the more specialized mountain and airborne troops. Overall, the Mod 56 has served in more than 30 countries worldwide, of which a partial listing of the major operators is below.

As an added refinement to the gun's mass, the Mod 56 is built to be an artillery piece with a reputation of ease with which it can be assembled and then disassembled into twelve components within minutes. The gun's light weight did have the drawback that it lacked the robustness necessary for sustained operations. Australian and New Zealand gunners in South Vietnam found the weapon unsuitable for continuous operations. The guns were replaced by the sturdy US-made M101A1 after some two years. The lack of durability also led to their being carried on trucks for longer distances outside the combat zone. The Mod 56 offered limited protection to its crew.

The Chinese manufacturer NORINCO offers a version of the Model 56 pack howitzer and its associated ammunition.

In Commonwealth service, the gun was known simply as the "L5 pack howitzer" with L10 ordnance. However, its lack of range and the indifferent lethality of its ammunition led the UK to start development of its replacement, the L118 light gun, which provided British Gunners a significant advantage in range when facing the Argentine OTO Melaras during the Falklands war.

The gun became the standard equipment of the Allied Command Europe Mobile Force (AMF ACE Mobile Force (Land)) artillery, equipping the batteries provided by Canada, Belgium, Germany, Italy and the UK until 1975.

=== Combat service ===
Identified combat use includes:

- Argentine Army 3rd and 4th Artillery Groups during the 1982 Falklands War
- British Army during the Aden Emergency in South Yemen (1st Light Regiment Royal Horse Artillery and 19 Light Regiment RA) and Borneo (4, 6, 29 Cdo, 40, 45 and 95 Cdo Light Regiments RA)
- Australian Army during the Malayan Emergency in Borneo and Malaya (102 Field Battery) and during the Vietnam War in 1965–1967 (and very limited use thereafter) by 101, 103, 105, 106, and 108 Field Batteries
- Malaysian Army in Borneo and Peninsular Malaysia during the Second Malayan Emergency (1968–1989); also during 2013 Lahad Datu standoff
- Nigerian Army during Nigerian Civil War. Some were captured by Biafrans.
- New Zealand Army deployed rotations of 4 guns during the Vietnam War (161 Battery of the 16th Field Regiment).
- Pakistan Army during the 1971 war and Siachen conflict
- Ukrainian Army during the Russo-Ukrainian War in Bakhmut, Ukraine, in March 2023

== Operators ==
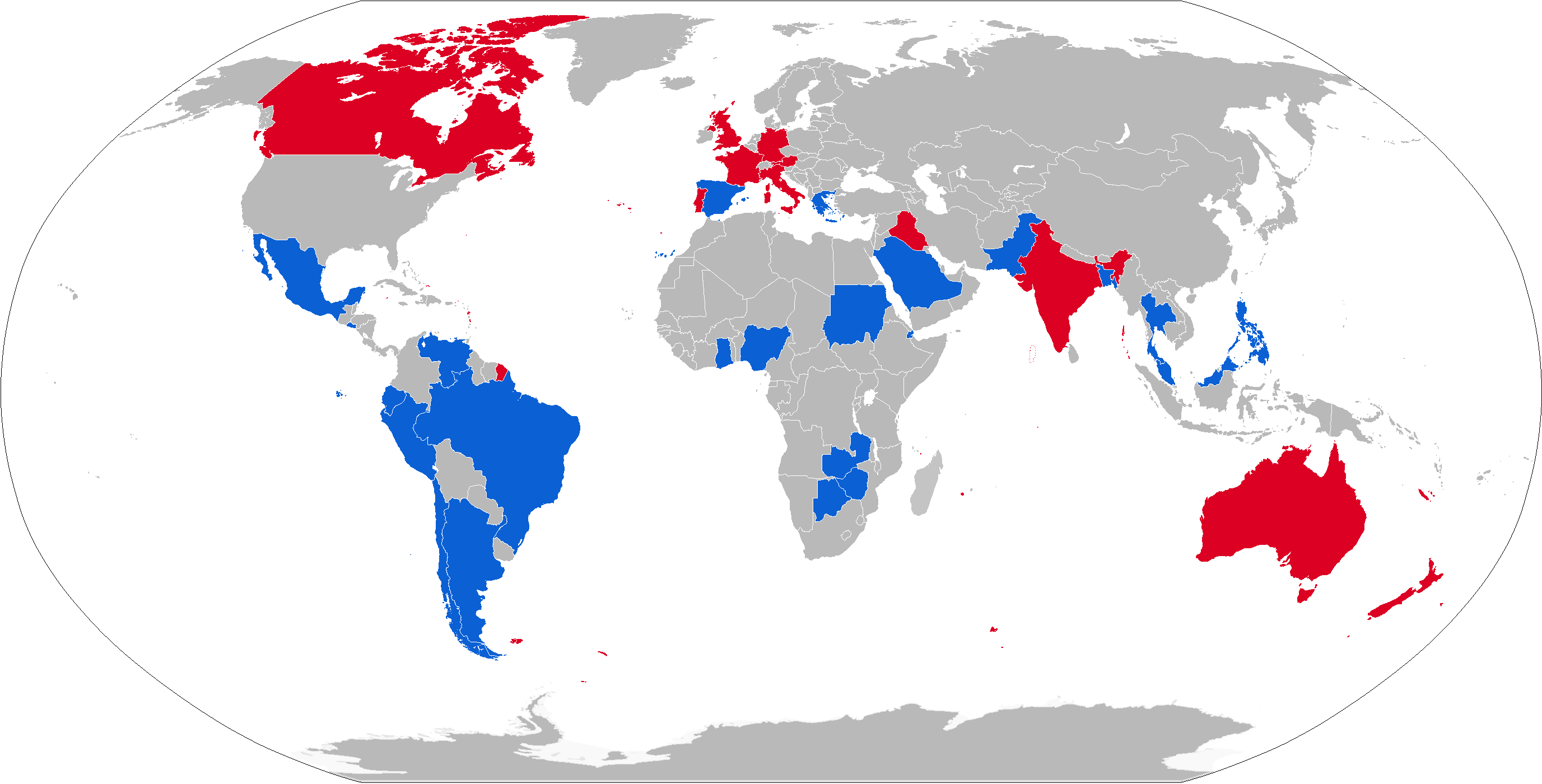
Operators of the Mod 56 (current in blue; former in red)

=== Current operators (2024) ===
- Argentina - 64 (Army) and 13 (Naval Infantry)
- Bangladesh - 170
- Botswana - 6
- Brazil - 60
- Chile - 104
- Ecuador - 24
- Kenya - 7
- Malaysia - 100
- Peru - 24
- Philippines - 100 (Army) 20 (Marine Corps)
- San Marino - 2
- Spain - 148 (Army) and 24 (Naval Infantry)
- Ukraine - 6 donated to Ukraine by Spain. At least one was lost in combat.
- Venezuela - 40
- Zambia - 18

=== Former operators ===
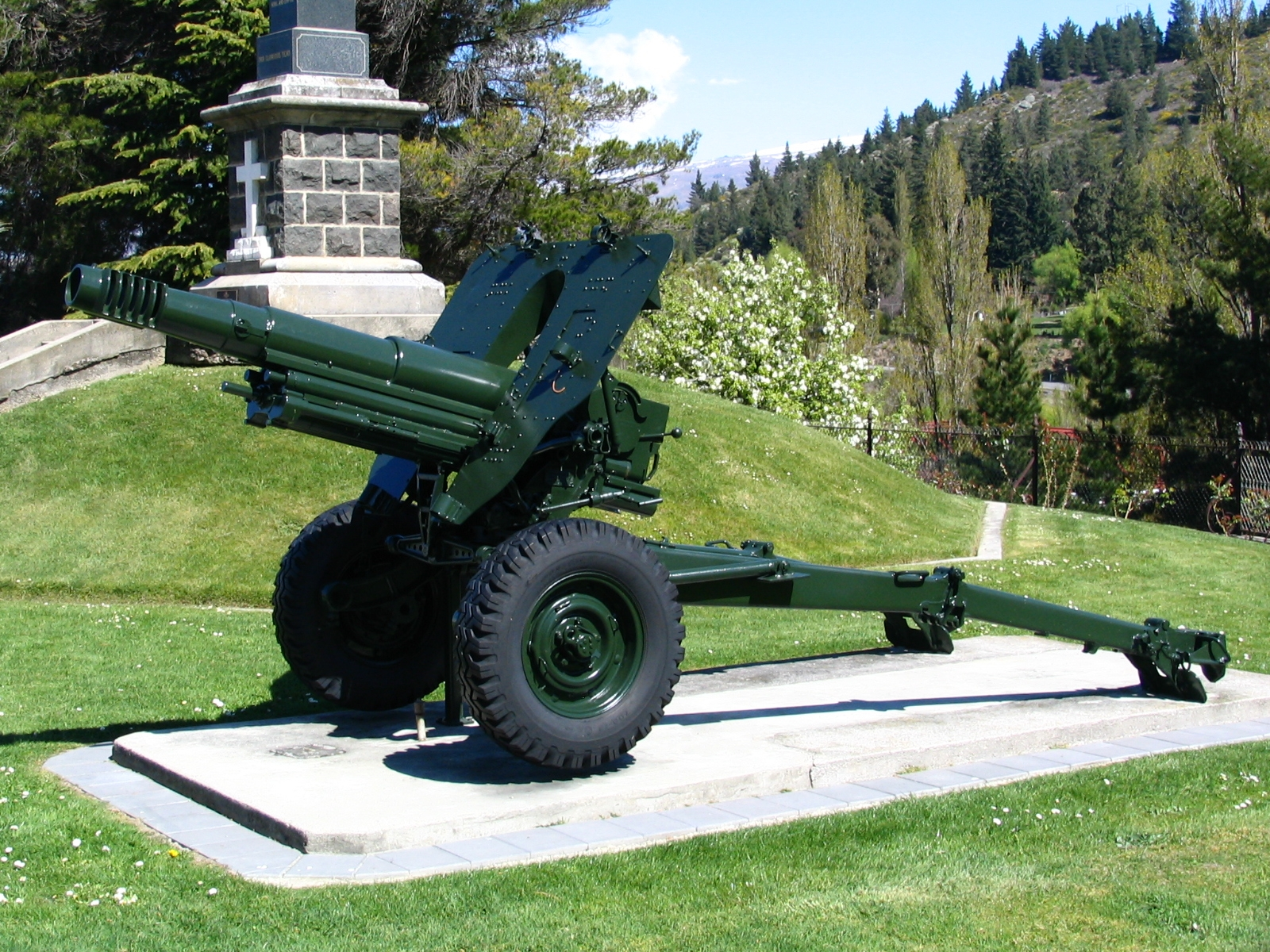
A L5 Pack Howitzer formerly used by the New Zealand Army on display as part of a war memorial in Clyde, New Zealand

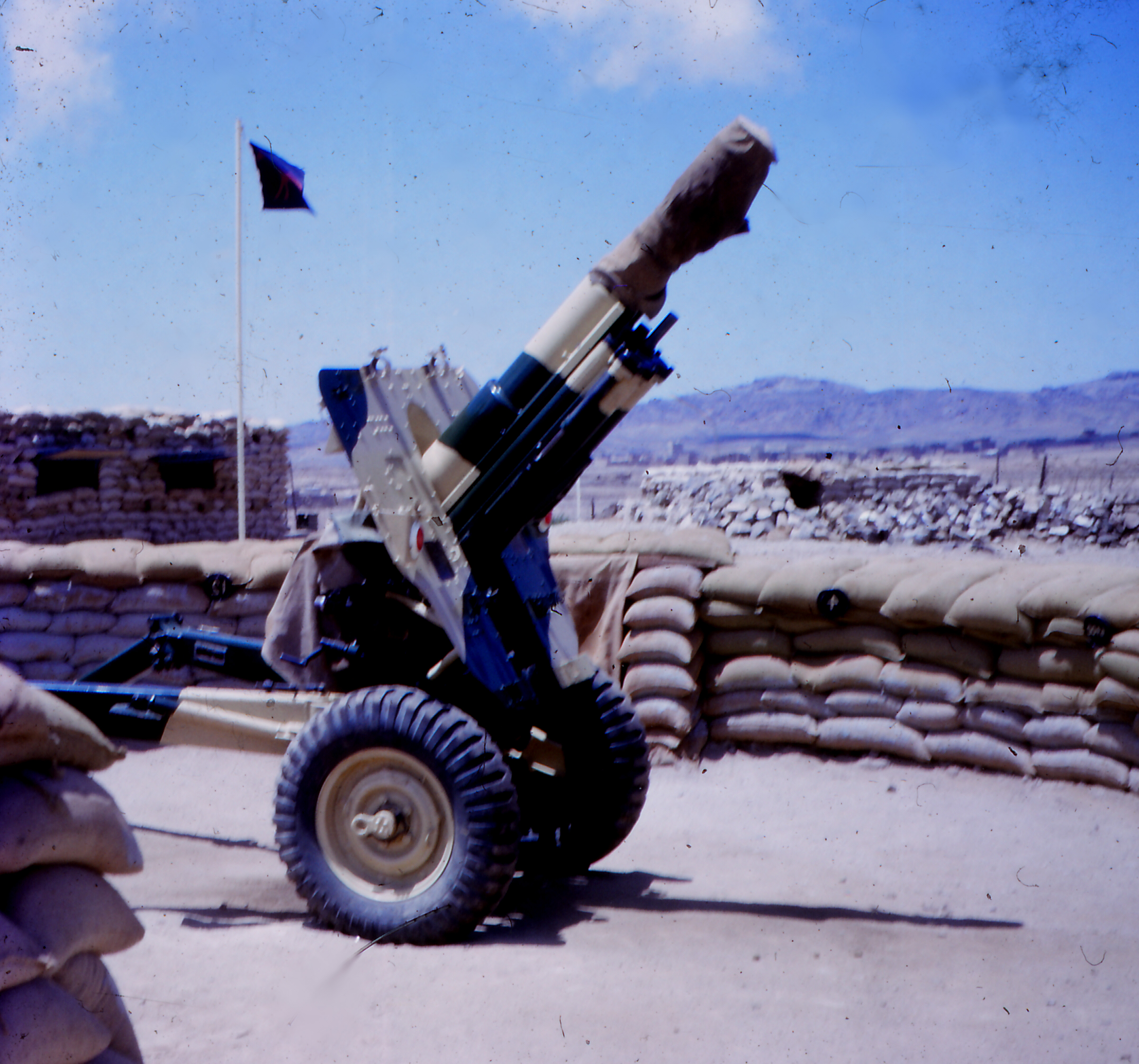
L5 Pack Howitzer of 1 Regiment Royal Horse Artillery during the Aden Emergency

- Australia
- Austria
- Belgium - 2 in 2003
- (Republic of Biafra) Biafra - captured from Nigeria
- Burkina Faso - 2 in 2003
- Canada - 22 in 2003
- China - 2 in 2003
- Cyprus - 54 in 2003
- Djibouti - 1 in 2003
- Ethiopia - 2 in 2003
- France - 28 in 2003
- Germany - 19 in 2003
- Ghana
- Greece - 18
- India - 50
- Indonesia - 10 in 2003
- Iraq - 118 in 2003
- Iran - 12 in 2003
- Italy - 18
- Kuwait - 6 in 2003
- Morocco - 16 in 2003
- Nepal - 14
- New Zealand - 8 in 2003
- Nigeria - 50

- Boko Haram: At least 1 captured from Nigeria

- Pakistan - 213
- Portugal - 24 in 2003
- Saudi Arabia - 24 in 2003
- Somalia - 89 in 2003
- Sudan
- Thailand - 12
- United Arab Emirates - 18 in 2003
- United Kingdom - 52 in 2003
- Yemen - 4 in 2003
- (Socialist Federal Republic of Yugoslavia) Yugoslavia. After its dissolution the guns come under control of the new states, as follows:
  - Bosnia and Herzegovina - 3 in 2003
  - Croatia - 2 in 2003
  - (North Macedonia) Macedonia - 2 in 2003
  - Serbia and Montenegro Federation - 17 in 2003
- Zimbabwe - 9 in 2003
