= Mountain gun =

Artillery pieces designed for use in mountain warfare

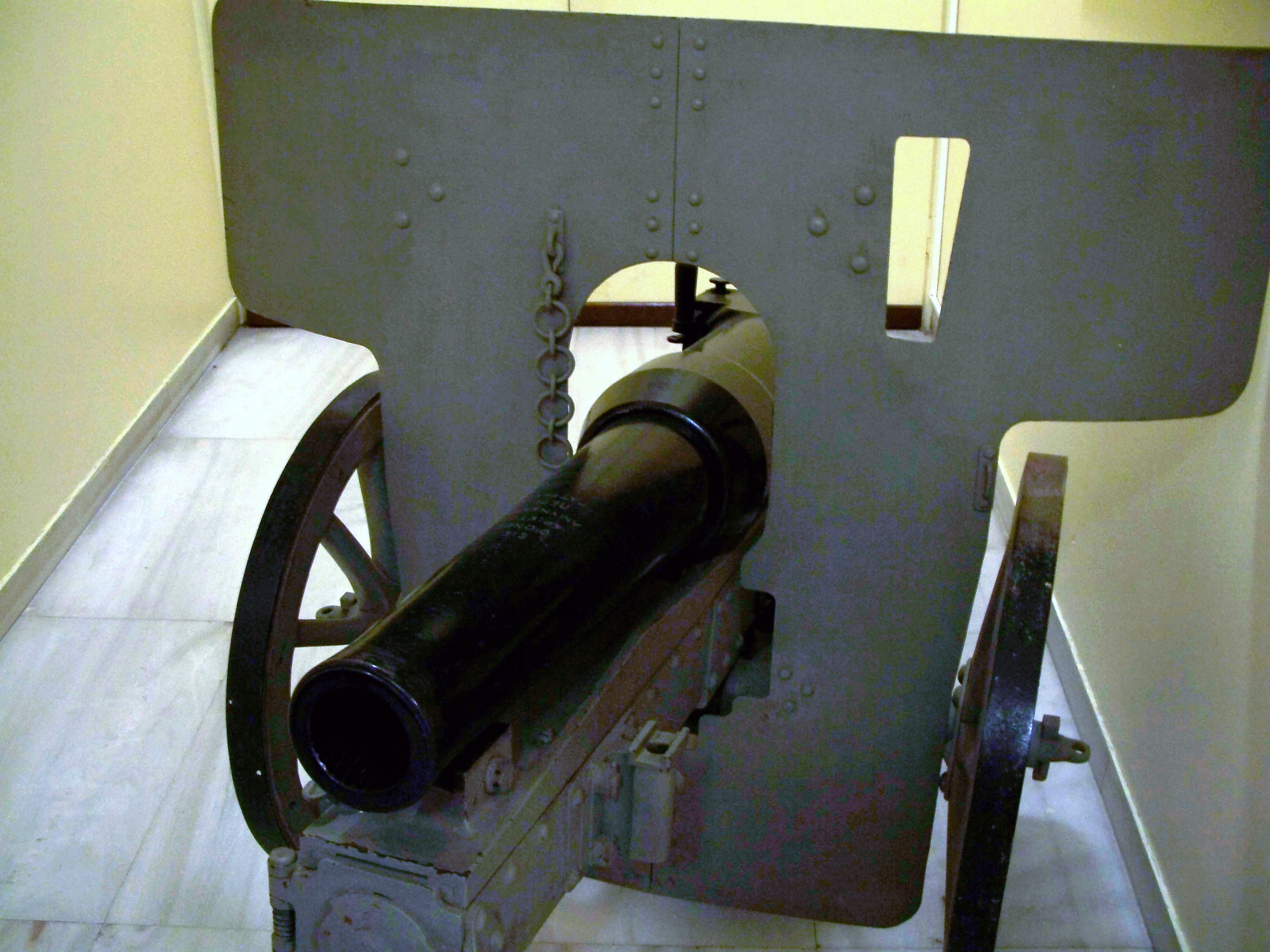
P. Lykoudis's original 1891 dismantleable breechloading gun with recoil control

Mountain guns are artillery pieces designed for mountain warfare and other areas where wheeled transport is not possible. They are generally capable of being taken apart to make smaller loads for transport by horses, humans, mules, tractors, or trucks. As such, they are sometimes called "pack guns" or "pack howitzers". During the American Civil War these small portable guns were widely used and were called "mountain howitzers".

The first designs of modern breechloading mountain guns with recoil control and the capacity to be easily broken down and reassembled into highly efficient units were made by Greek army engineers P. Lykoudis and Panagiotis Danglis (after whom the Schneider-Danglis gun was named) in the 1890s.

Mountain guns are similar to infantry support guns. They are largely outdated, their role being filled by howitzers, mortars, multiple rocket launchers, recoilless rifles, and missiles. Most modern artillery is manufactured from light-weight materials and can be transported fully assembled by helicopters.

== See also ==
- List of mountain artillery

== Images ==
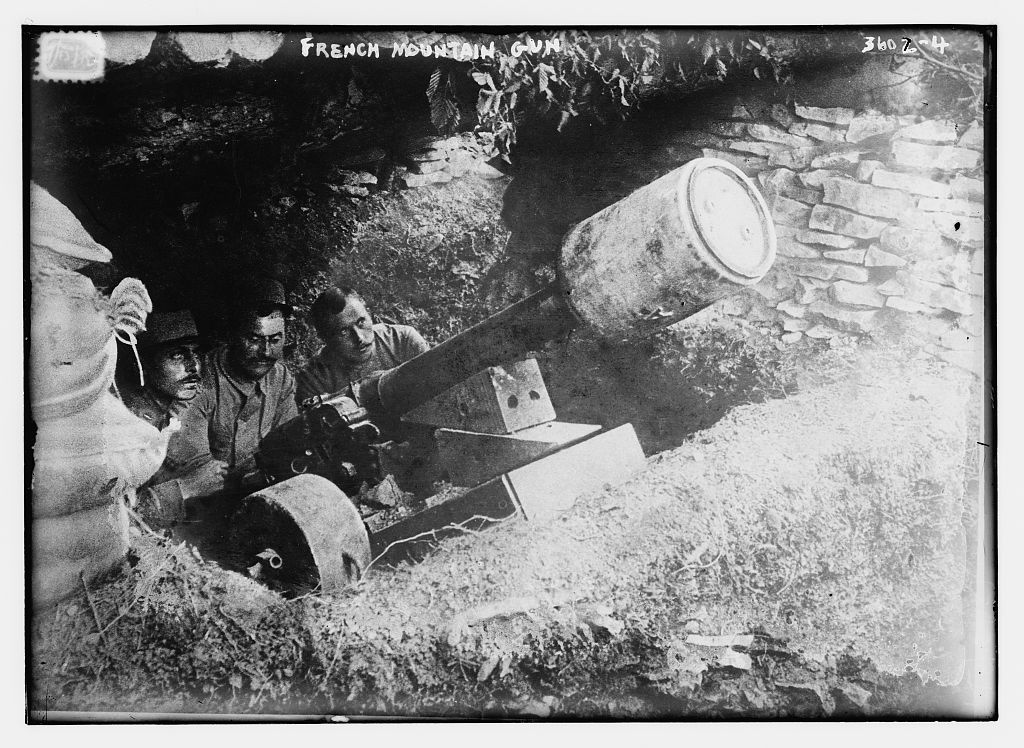
80 mm French mountain gun with a 59-kilogram (130 lb) air mine attached c. 1915

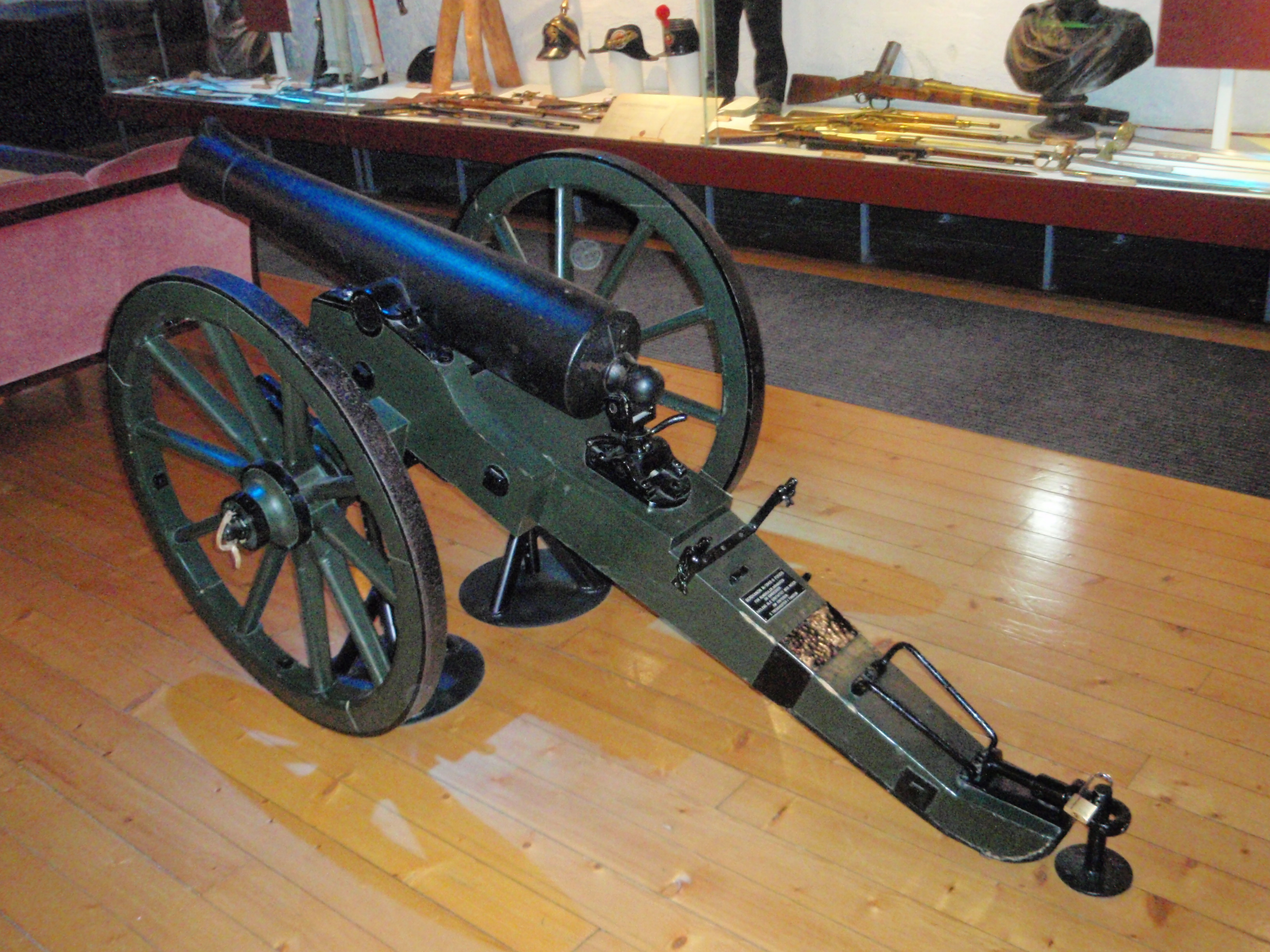
Norwegian 6-pounder muzzle-loading mountain cannon of 1848

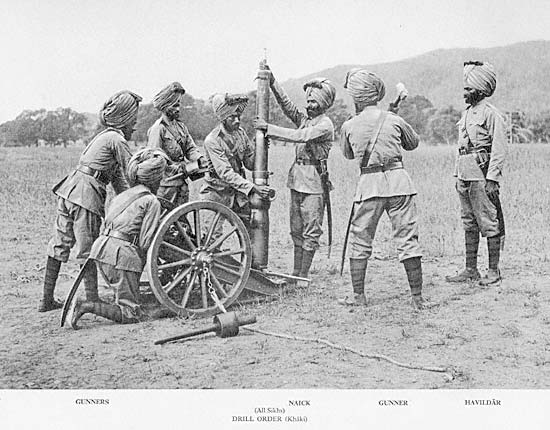
British Indian Army crew assembles a 2.5 inch muzzle-loading "screw gun" c. 1895

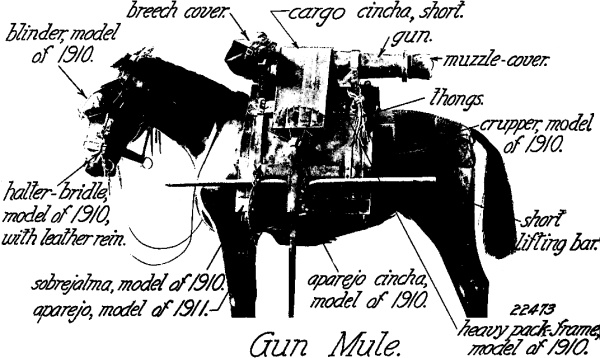
Mule transport of barrel of US Army 75 mm pack howitzer c. 1916

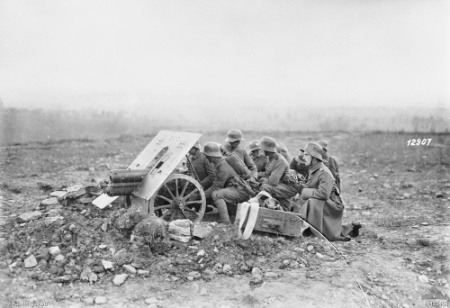
German crew using a Skoda 75 mm Model 15 as an improvised anti-tank gun, 1918

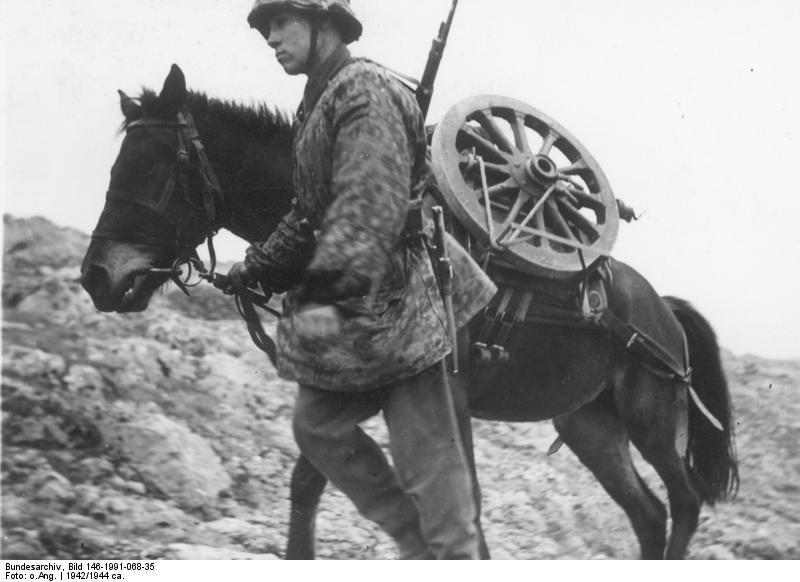
Germany army pack transport of gun wheels, 1942

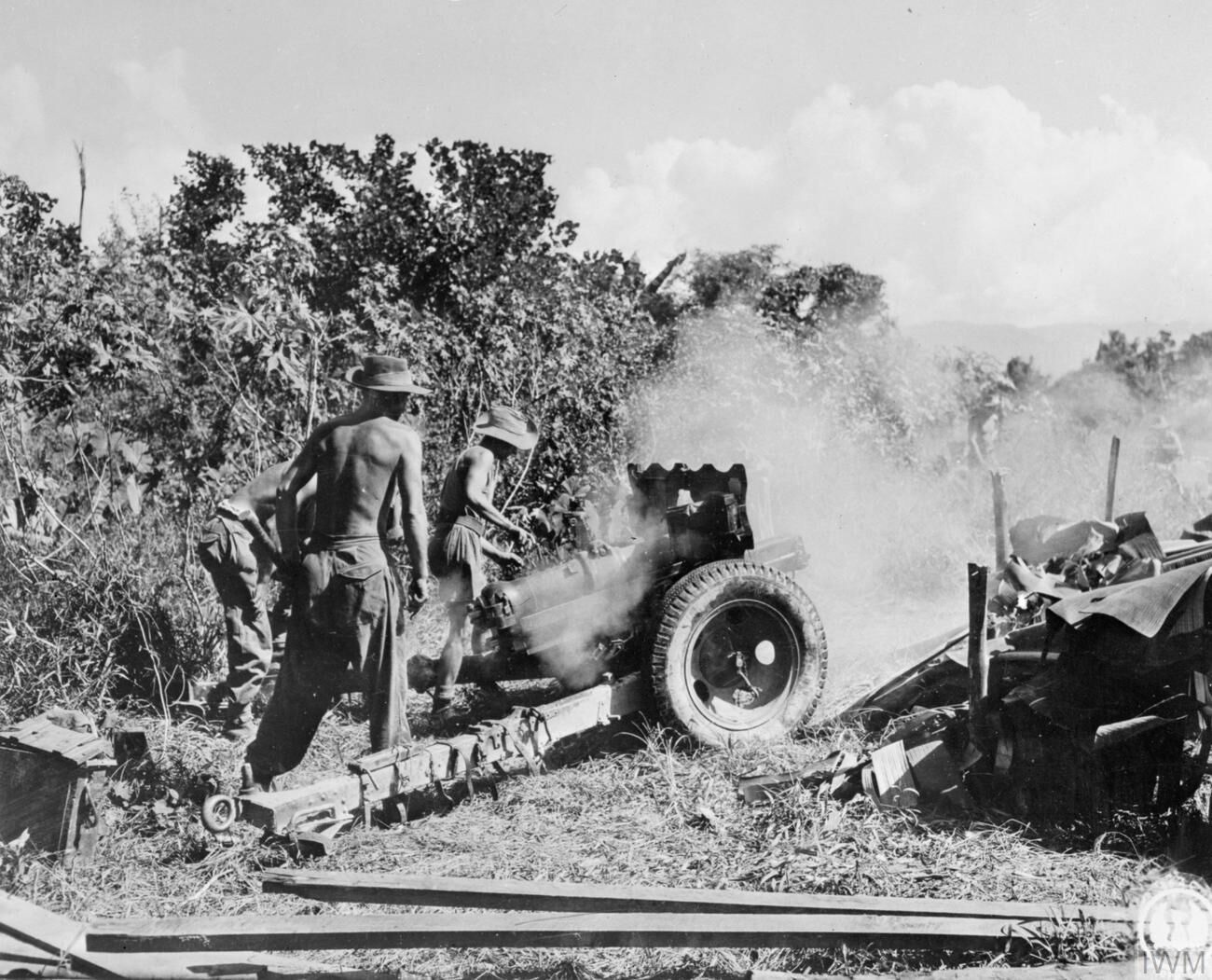
British 3.7-inch mountain howitzer crew in action in Burma, 1944

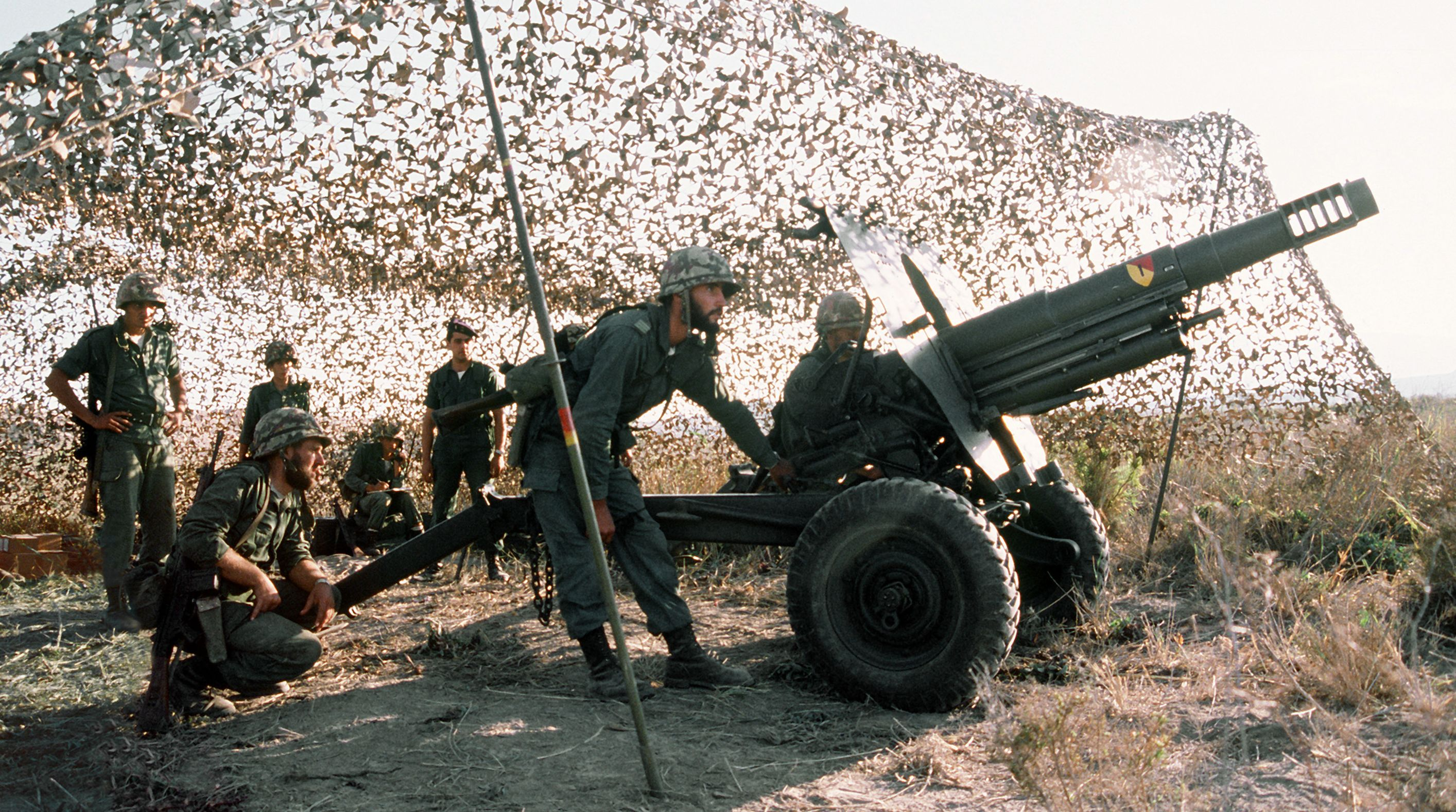
Spanish Marines manning an Oto Melara 105 mm pack howitzer in 1981

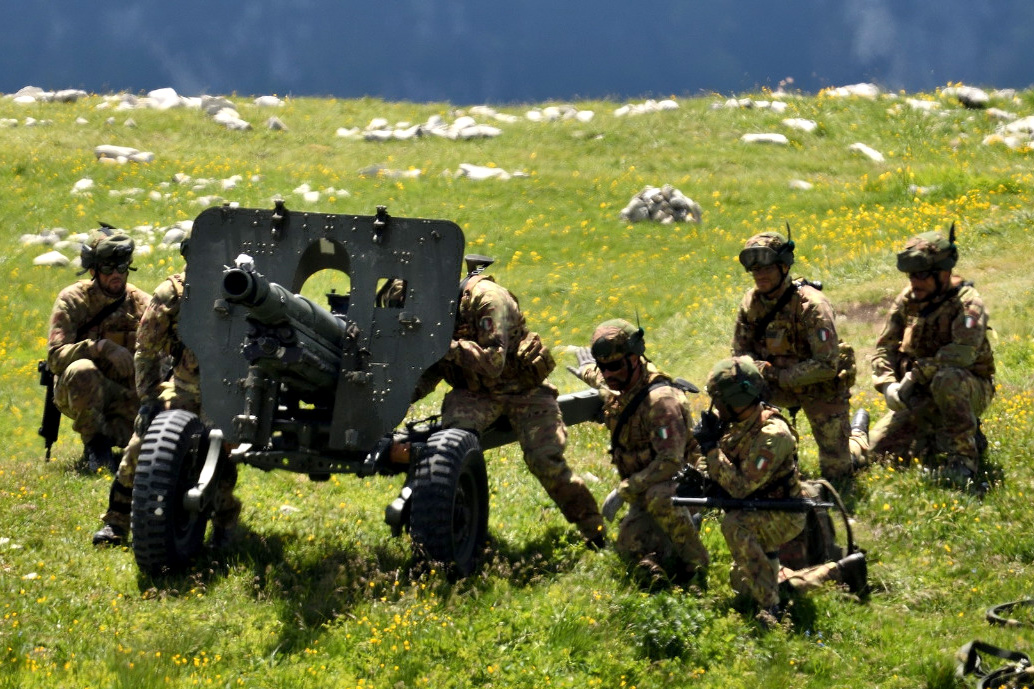
Italian mountain artillery troops with a Mod 56 in the Dolomites in 2019

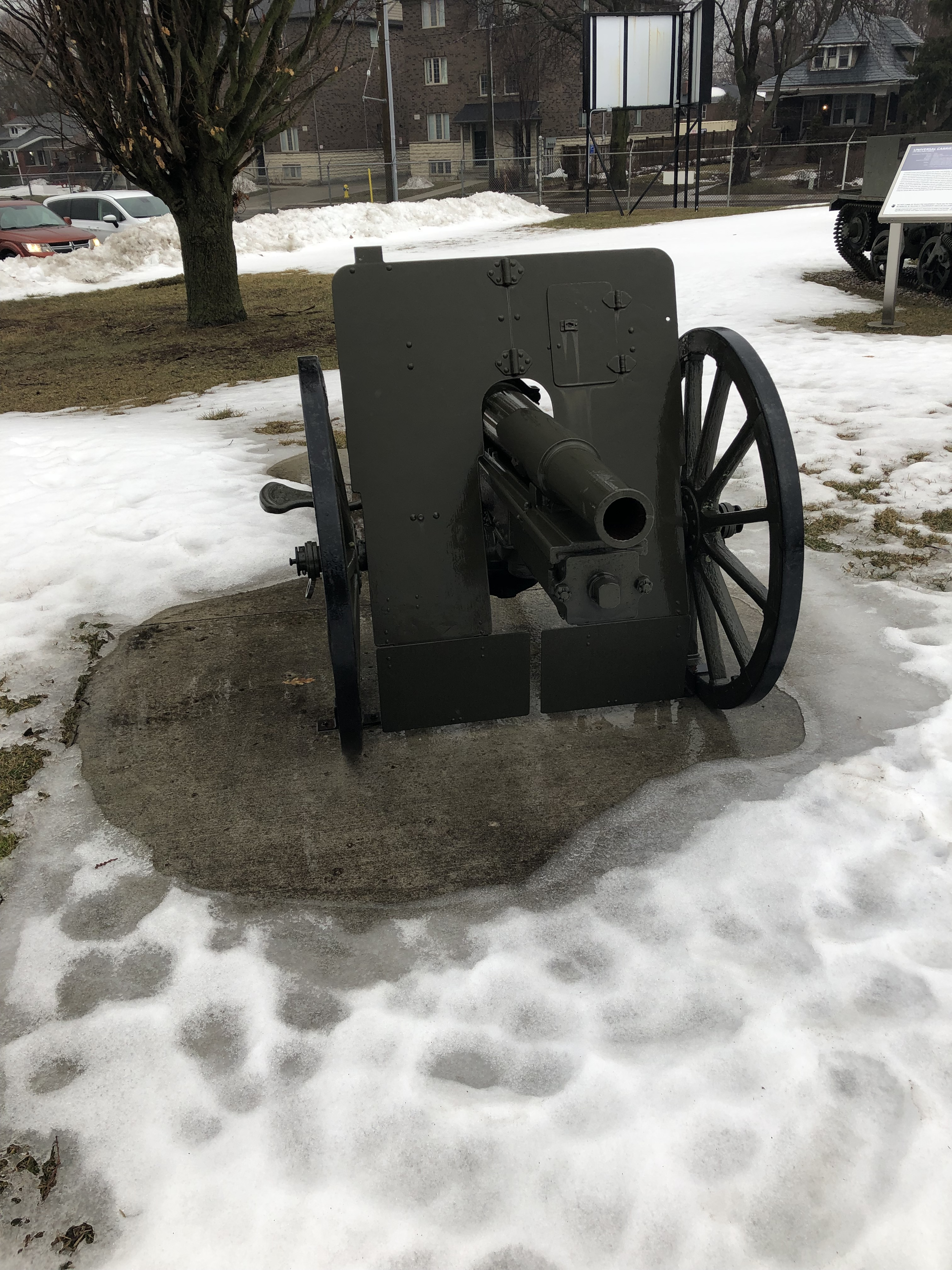
Type 41 75 mm mountain gun, a licensed copy of the German Krupp M1908, located at The Royal Canadian Regiment Museum in London, Ontario.
