= 66th Airmobile Infantry Regiment "Trieste" =

Active Italian Army infantry unit

- 66° Reggimento Fanteria Aeromobile "Trieste"
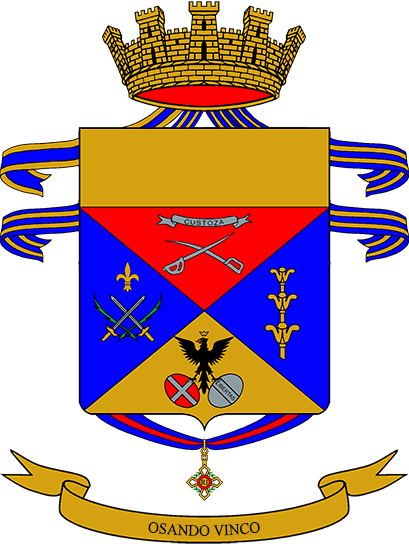
- Regimental coat of arms
- Active: 1 Aug. 1862 – 13 May 1943; 1 Oct. 1975 – today
- Country: Italy
- Branch: Italian Army
- Type: Airmobile infantry
- Part of: Airmobile Brigade "Friuli"
- Garrison/HQ: Forlì
- Motto: "Osando vinco"
- Anniversaries: 22 April 1943 – Battle of Takrouna
- Decorations: 1× Military Order of Italy; 1× Gold Medal of Military Valor; 1× Gold Medal of Army Valor; 1× Silver Medal of Army Valor; 1× Bronze Medal of Army Valor; 1× Silver Cross of Army Merit

Insignia
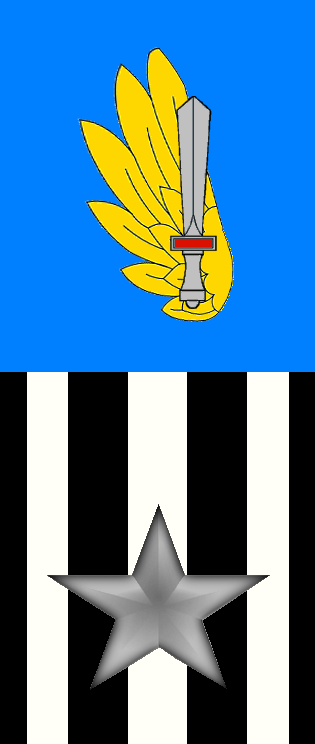
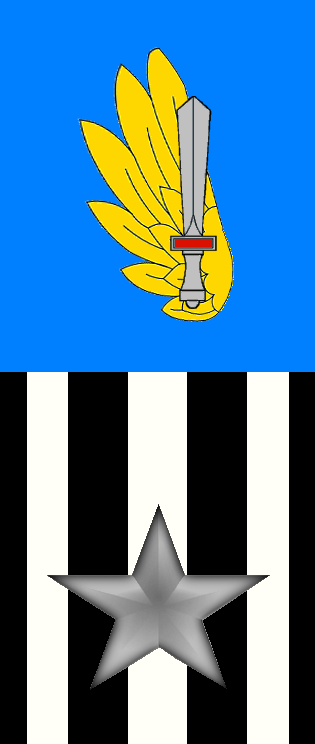
- Regimental gorget patches

The 66th Airmobile Infantry Regiment "Trieste" (Italian: 66° Reggimento Fanteria Aeromobile "Trieste") is an active unit of the Italian Army based in Forlì in the Emilia-Romagna and the Italian Army's only airmobile infantry unit. Formed in 1862 and originally named for the Valtellina valley the regiment is named since 1939 for the city of Trieste. The regiment is part of the Italian Army's infantry arm and assigned to the Airmobile Brigade "Friuli".

The regiment was one of ten infantry regiments formed on 1 August 1862. In 1866 the regiment participated in the Third Italian War of Independence. During World War I the regiment fought on the Italian front. During World War II the regiment was assigned to the 101st Motorized Division "Trieste", with which it fought in the Western Desert Campaign until regiment and division were destroyed in the Second Battle of El Alamein. The remnants of the regiment participated in the Tunisian Campaign, during which the regiment's I Battalion "Trieste" distinguished itself at Takrouna and was awarded Italy's highest military honor the Gold Medal of Military Valor. The regiment surrendered to allies forces on 13 May 1943. The regiment was reformed as battalion sized mechanized unit in 1975 and reorganized as an airmobile infantry unit in 2000.

== History ==
=== Formation ===
On 1 August 1862 the 45th Infantry Regiment (Brigade "Reggio"), 46th Infantry Regiment (Brigade "Reggio"), 47th Infantry Regiment (Brigade "Ferrara"), 48th Infantry Regiment (Brigade "Ferrara"), 49th Infantry Regiment (Brigade "Parma"), and 50th Infantry Regiment (Brigade "Parma") ceded their 17th Company and 18th Company to help form the 66th Infantry Regiment (Brigade "Valtellina") in San Maurizio Canavese. The twelve companies were grouped into three battalions. On the same date the 53rd Infantry Regiment (Brigade "Umbria") and the 54th Infantry Regiment (Brigade "Umbria") ceded both a depot company to help form the new regiment's depot in Turin, while the 3rd Provisional Depot in Bagheria in Sicily provided four companies to form the regiment's IV Battalion, which initially remained based in Bagheria.

The regiment was assigned, together with the 65th Infantry Regiment, to the Brigade "Valtellina" in Turin. The brigade's command and the 65th Infantry Regiment had also been formed on 1 August 1962, with the 25th Infantry Regiment (Brigade "Bergamo"), 26th Infantry Regiment (Brigade "Bergamo"), 41st Infantry Regiment (Brigade "Modena"), 42nd Infantry Regiment (Brigade "Modena"), 55th Infantry Regiment (Brigade "Marche"), and 56th Infantry Regiment (Brigade "Marche") ceding their 17th Company and 18th Company to help form the three battalions of the 65th Infantry Regiment, while the 52nd Infantry Regiment (Brigade "Alpi") and the 61st Infantry Regiment (Brigade "Sicilia") provided both a depot company. The 65th Infantry Regiment's IV Battalion was also formed in Sicily with four companies provided by the 2nd Provisional Depot in Palermo. Initially the regiment's IV Battalion remained based in Palermo.

In 1866 the regiment participated in the Third Italian War of Independence and fought in the Battle of Custoza. On 25 October 1871 the brigade level was abolished and the two regiments of the Brigade "Valtellina" were renamed 65th Infantry Regiment "Valtellina", respectively 66th Infantry Regiment "Valtellina". On 2 January 1881 the brigade level was reintroduced and the two regiments were renamed again as 65th Infantry Regiment (Brigade "Valtellina") and 66th Infantry Regiment (Brigade "Valtellina").

On 1 November 1884 the two regiments ceded some of their companies to help form the 94th Infantry Regiment (Brigade "Messina") in Lecce. In 1895–96 the regiment provided seven officers and 230 enlisted for units deployed to Italian Eritrea for the First Italo-Ethiopian War. In 1911–12 the regiment provided volunteers to augment units fighting in the Italo-Turkish War.

=== World War I ===
At the outbreak of World War I, the Brigade "Valtellina" formed, together with the Brigade "Bergamo" and the 21st Field Artillery Regiment, the 7th Division. At the time the 66th Infantry Regiment consisted of three battalions, each of which fielded four fusilier companies and one machine gun section. After Italy's entry into the war on 23 May 1915 the Brigade "Valtellina" was deployed to the Italian front: in August 1915 the brigade fought against Austro-Hungarian forces in the Tolmin sector, where it tried to take the hills of Bučenica and Mengore. In November 1916 the brigade fought in the Ninth Battle of the Isonzo in the Jamiano area. On 20 February 1917 the 66th Infantry Regiment's depot in Reggio Emilia formed the brigade command of the Brigade "Massa Carrara" and the 251st Infantry Regiment (Brigade "Massa Carrara"). In August of the same year the brigade was on the Karst plateau in the Sela na Krasu area, where the brigade fought in the Eleventh Battle of the Isonzo.

In 28 February 1918 the depot of the regiment in Reggio Emilia formed the brigade command of the Brigade "Treviso" and the command of the 100th Infantry Regiment (Brigade "Treviso"). In fall 1918 the brigade operated in the Val d'Assa valley, where in October the brigade fought on Cima Tre Pezzi.

=== Interwar years ===
On 15 October 1926 the 65th Infantry Regiment, now renamed 65th Infantry Regiment "Valtellina", was assigned to the VIII Infantry Brigade, which was the infantry component of the 8th Territorial Division of Piacenza. On 20 October 1926 the command of the Brigade "Valtellina" was disbanded and the 66th Infantry Regiment, now renamed 66th Infantry Regiment "Valtellina", was assigned to the XVI Infantry Brigade, which was the infantry component of the 16th Territorial Division of Bologna.

In 1934 the 8th Territorial Division of Piacenza changed its name to 8th Infantry Division "Po", while the 16th Territorial Division of Bologna changed its name to 16th Infantry Division "Fossalta". The name change that also extended to the two divisions' infantry brigades. In 1935–36 the regiment provided four officers and 1,079 enlisted for units deployed for the Second Italo-Ethiopian War.

In 1936 the regiment moved from Reggio Emilia to Parma. On 6 May 1937 the 66th Infantry Regiment "Valtellina" was transferred from the 16th Infantry Division "Fossalta" to the 8th Motorized Division "Po" and renamed 66th Motorized Infantry Regiment "Valtellina". On 2 January 1939 the division changed its number from 8th to 101st Motorized Division "Po" and on 4 April 1939 the division changed its name to 101st Motorized Division "Trieste". On the same date the VIII Infantry Brigade "Po" was disbanded and the two infantry regiments came under direct command of the division and were renamed 65th Infantry Regiment "Trieste", respectively 66th Infantry Regiment "Trieste". The same year the 66th Infantry Regiment "Trieste" moved from Parma to Piacenza.

=== World War II ===
At the outbreak of World War II the regiment consisted of a command, a command company, three fusilier battalions, a support weapons battery equipped with 65/17 infantry support guns, and a mortar company equipped with 81mm Mod. 35 mortars. In June 1940 the division was in the reserve during the Italian invasion of France.

==== Western Desert Campaign ====
In September 1941 the Trieste division disembarked in Libya for the Western Desert Campaign. The division was immediately employed in the Siege of Tobruk covering the besieging forces right flank. The division then moved to Bir Hakeim to block British attacks from the southeastern desert. On 18 November 1941 the British Eighth Army launched Operation Crusader to relieve the siege of Tobruk. On 24 November, General Erwin Rommel ordered the Afrika Korps and 132nd Armored Division "Ariete" to push east to relieve the Siege of Bardia and the Axis frontier garrisons, while the Trieste division was sent South to cover the right flank of Rommel's advance. On 6 December the Axis forces received the order to retreat westwards and the Trieste division formed the rearguard and fought delaying battles at Bir Bellafaa, Sidi Breghish, Alem Hamza, and Suluq. On 21 January 1942 Panzer Group Africa attacked and drove British forces back to Ain el Gazala. On 26 May 1942 Axis forced commenced the Battle of Gazala, during which the Trieste division was ordered to open a gap in the minefield north of the Bir Hakeim. On 29 May the Trieste division had broken through British lines and reached Got el Ualeb, while to the division's South the Battle of Bir Hakeim unfolded. On 8–11 June the division participated in the assault on Bir Hakeim, which the French defenders abandoned on 11 June. The next day the division took part in the destruction of the British 2nd and 4th Armoured Brigades. From 19 June the Trieste division participated in the Axis offensive to capture Tobruk, which fell on 21 June. The division then pursued the retreating British forces and clashed with rearguards at Sidi Omar, Mersa Matruh until reaching El Alamein in Egypt.

==== Battles of El Alamein ====
On 1 July 1942 the First Battle of El Alamein began and the Trieste put up a tenacious defence on Ruweisat Ridge on the night of 21–22 July. The division lost two regimental commanders before being partly overcome by British attacks, but the delay of the Allied advance allowed German armored forces to launch a devastating counterattack.

During the Battle of Alam el Halfa the Trieste was in the center of the Axis advance, but stiff British resistance forced General Erwin Rommel to abandon the battle. On 23 October 1942 the British commenced the Second Battle of El Alamein and the Trieste initially formed the reserve in the North of the Axis line. On 26 October the Trieste entered the front line. On 2 November British forces broke through the Trieste's line and a 4–5-km gap opened between the battalions of the 65th Infantry Regiment "Trieste". Most of the Trieste was annihilated over the course of the next two days. On 4 November the division's command and most of the 66th Infantry Regiment "Trieste" retreated to Fuka and thus escaped the destruction of Axis forces at El Alamein.

The remnants of the German-Italian Panzer Army retreated to El Agheila, where on 26 November 1942 the Trieste's two infantry regiments were reorganized and brought back up to combat strength by accumulating the survivors of other divisions.

- 65th Infantry Regiment "Trieste"
  - I Battalion "Trieste" (4x companies, survivors of the 65th Infantry Regiment "Trieste", 17th Infantry Division "Pavia", and 27th Infantry Division "Brescia")
  - II Battalion "Bologna" (5x companies, survivors of the 25th Infantry Division "Bologna")
  - III Battalion "Trento" (3x companies, survivors of the 102nd Motorized Division "Trento")
- 66th Infantry Regiment "Trieste"
  - I Battalion (2x companies, survivors of the 66th Infantry Regiment "Trieste")
  - II Battalion (2x companies, survivors of the 66th Infantry Regiment "Trieste")
  - III Battalion "Granatieri" (3x companies, survivors of the IV Anti-tank Battalion "Granatieri di Sardegna")

==== Tunisian Campaign ====
On 11–18 December 1942 the Trieste participated in the Battle of El Agheila, after which Axis forces resumed their retreat towards Tunisia where the Trieste participated in the Tunisian Campaign. In February 1943 the I and II battalions of the 66th Infantry Regiment "Trieste" merged and formed the I Battalion "Trieste", while the III Battalion "Granatieri" was renumbered as II Battalion "Granatieri". The regiment then received the III Battalion "Folgore", which had been formed with the survivors of the 185th Infantry Division "Folgore". The division then fought in the Battle of Medenine, the Battle of the Mareth Line, and the Battle of Wadi Akarit, before retreating to the Enfidaville Line, where the regiment's I Battalion "Trieste" was attacked at Takrouna on 20 April 1943 by the 2nd New Zealand Division. The battalion withstood the attack until 22 April and only surrendered after running out of ammunition. On 13 May 1943 the remnants of the Trieste division surrendered to allied forces.

For its defense of Takrouna the regiment's I Battalion "Trieste" was awarded Italy's highest military honor the Gold Medal of Military Valor.

=== Cold War ===
During the 1975 army reform the army disbanded the regimental level and newly independent battalions were granted for the first time their own flags. On 30 September 1975 the 40th Infantry Regiment "Bologna" in Bologna was disbanded and the next day the regiment's II Battalion in Forlì Veronese was reorganized and renamed 66th Mechanized Infantry Battalion "Valtellina" and assigned the flag and traditions of the 66th Infantry Regiment "Trieste". To avoid confusion with support units of the Mechanized Brigade "Trieste" the battalion's name was changed from "Trieste" to its original name "Valtellina".

The battalion was assigned to the Mechanized Brigade "Trieste" and consisted of a command, a command and services company, three mechanized companies with M113 armored personnel carriers, and a heavy mortar company with M106 mortar carriers with 120mm Mod. 63 mortars. At the time the battalion fielded 896 men (45 officers, 100 non-commissioned officers, and 751 soldiers).

For its conduct and work after the 1980 Irpinia earthquake the battalion was awarded a Bronze Medal of Army Valor, which was affixed to the battalion's flag and is depicted on the battalion's coats of arms.

=== Recent times ===
On 31 May 1991 the Mechanized Brigade "Trieste" was disbanded and the next day most of the units of the brigade, including the 66th Mechanized Infantry Battalion "Valtellina", joined the Motorized Brigade "Friuli", which was renamed on that date Mechanized Brigade "Friuli". In 1992 the battalion was deployed for Operation Sicilian Vespers in Sicily. On 6 September 1993 the 66th Mechanized Infantry Battalion "Valtellina" lost its autonomy and the next day the battalion entered the reformed 66th Infantry Regiment "Trieste" as I Mechanized Battalion. The regiment not only became the custodian of the flag and traditions of the 66th Infantry Regiment "Trieste", but also of the traditions of the "Trieste" brigades and the "Trieste" division.

From August 1993 to March 1994, the regiment participated in United Nations Operation in Somalia II in Somalia. In the following years the regiment was repeatedly deployed in the Balkans. In 2000 the regiment was reorganized as an airmobile infantry unit and renamed 66th Airmobile Infantry Regiment "Trieste". In 2004 the regiment was deployed to Nasiriyah in Iraq, where it fought a heavy battle with Iraqi insurgents on 7 and 8 September 2004. For its conduct in Iraq the regiment was awarded a Silver Medal of Army Valor.

In 2008 the regiment was deployed to Herat Province in Afghanistan as part of Italy's contribution to NATO's International Security Assistance Force. During the regiment's stay in Herat its troops repeatedly engaged Taliban forces in combat, for which the regiment was awarded Gold Medal of Army Valor.

== Organization ==
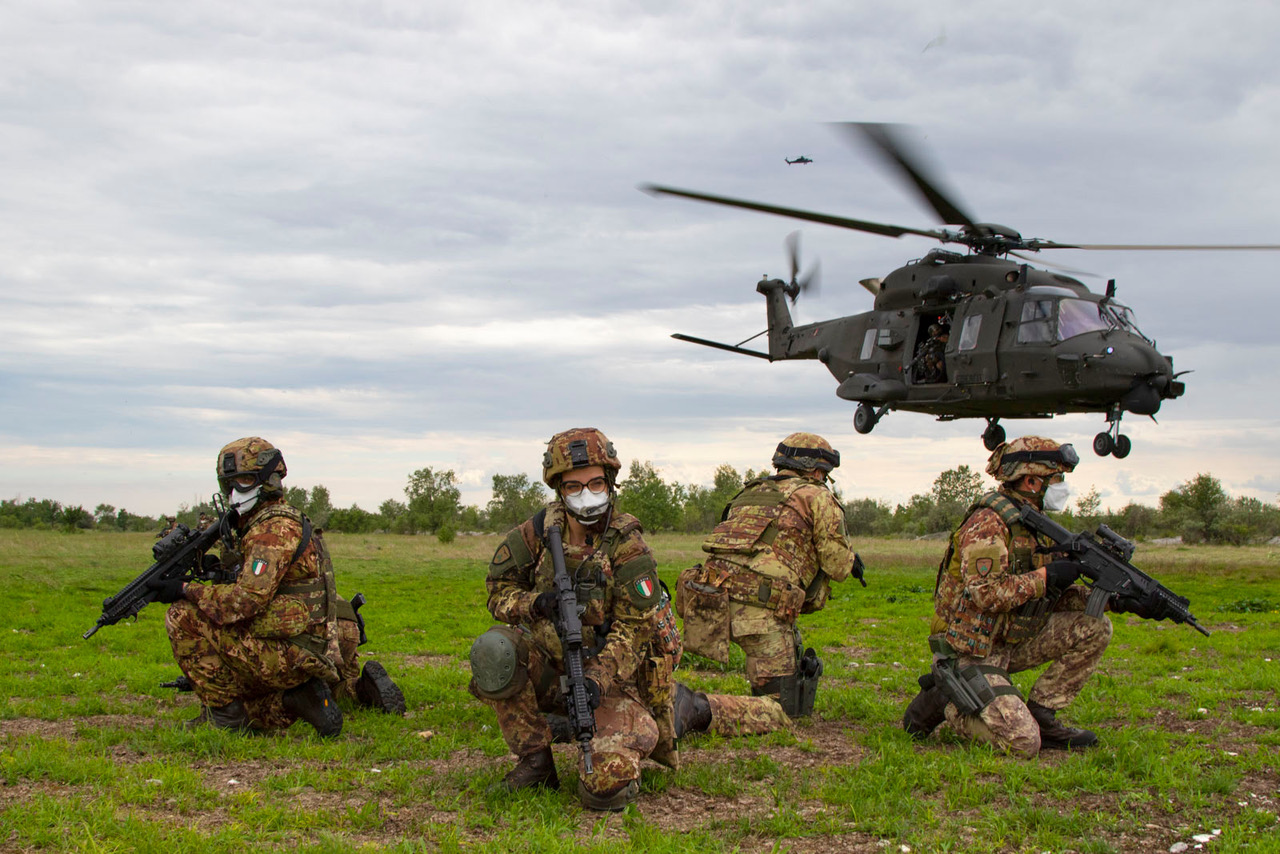
66th Airmobile Infantry Regiment "Trieste" soldiers and 7th Army Aviation Regiment "Vega" NH90 helicopter and during exercise Kinetic I/2020

As of 2023 the 66th Airmobile Infantry Regiment "Trieste" is organized as follows:

- 66th Airmobile Infantry Regiment "Trieste", in Forlì
  - Command and Logistic Support Company
  - 1st Airmobile Battalion
    - 1st Airmobile Company
    - 2nd Airmobile Company
    - 3rd Airmobile Company
    - Airmobile Maneuver Support Company

The regiment is equipped with VTLM Lince vehicles. The Maneuver Support Company is equipped with 120mm mortars and Spike MR anti-tank guided missiles.

== See also ==
- Airmobile Brigade "Friuli"
