= Nino Sozzani =

Italian general

- Born: 15 August 1889; Salsomaggiore Terme, Kingdom of Italy
- Died: 24 May 1977 (aged 87); Salsomaggiore Terme, Italy
- Military career
- Allegiance: Kingdom of Italy; Italian Social Republic
- Branch: Royal Italian Army; National Republican Army
- Service years: 1907–1945
- Rank: Major General
- Commands: 53rd Infantry Regiment "Umbria"; 2nd Bersaglieri Regiment; 1st Cavalry Division Eugenio di Savoia; 30th Infantry Division Sabauda; 44th Infantry Division Cremona; 136th Armored Division "Giovani Fascisti"; 203rd Regional Military Command
- Conflicts: Italo-Turkish War; Battle and massacre at Shar al-Shatt; World War I; Battles of the Isonzo; First Battle of the Piave; Italian invasion of Albania; World War II; Tunisian campaign; Battle of Medenine; Battle of the Mareth Line; Battle of Wadi Akarit; Battle of Enfidaville
- Awards: Silver Medal of Military Valor; War Cross of Military Valor; Military Order of Savoy; Order of the Crown of Italy; Order of Saints Maurice and Lazarus

Nino Sozzani (15 August 1889 – 24 May 1977) was an Italian general during World War II.

== Biography ==
He was born in Salsomaggiore Terme on 15 August 1889. On 14 September 1907 he began to attend the Royal Military Academy of Infantry and Cavalry in Modena, graduating with the rank of second lieutenant of Bersaglieri corps on 17 September 1910. Between 1911 and in 1912 he participated in the Italo-Turkish War distinguishing himself in the battle of Shar al-Shatt, managing to escape capture and saving himself from the subsequent massacre carried out by the Turkish and Arabs against the Italian soldiers they had captured.

During the First World War he fought with the Third Army on the Karst Plateau, distinguishing himself in the battles of the Isonzo and rising in rank from second lieutenant to major. In June 1918 he was decorated with a Silver Medal of Military Valor personally presented to him by the commander of the 3rd Army, Emanuele Filiberto of Savoy-Aosta for the courage shown in defending the Candelù sector during the First Battle of the Piave.

After the war, he was promoted to colonel on 17 August 1930 and given command of the 53rd Infantry Regiment "Umbria" in 1935-1936 and then of the 2nd Bersaglieri Regiment, stationed in Rome, from 1936 1939. In April 1939 he participated in the conquest of Albania, landing in Durrës at the head of a regiment of Bersaglieri.

From August 1939, after promotion to brigadier general, he was deputy commander and then commander of the 1st Cavalry Division Eugenio di Savoia, and from 1 August 1940 he was commander of the 30th Infantry Division Sabauda in Cagliari, replacing Brigadier General Ubaldo Scanagatta, who had died in a road accident near the Tirso dam on 21 July. During his stay in Sardinia he improved defensive works in the area garrisoned by his division.

He was promoted to major general on 1 January 1942, and on 22 February 1942 he was transferred to the command of the 44th Infantry Division Cremona, which he left on 9 November, being replaced by his deputy Gioacchino Solinas. After the second battle of El Alamein he was immediately transferred to Tunisia and, after a short period at the disposal of the XXI Army Corps, on 22 November he became commander of the 136th Armored Division "Giovani Fascisti", participating in the battles of Medenine, of the Mareth Line, of Wadi Akarit and of Enfidaville until 12 April 1943, when he was repatriated following to the death in combat of his only son Luigi, a pilot in the Regia Aeronautica, being replaced by General Guido Boselli at the head of the "Giovani Fascisti". Sozzani was then assigned to the Ministry of War; on 9 June 1943 he was awarded the title of Knight of the Military Order of Savoy.

After the Armistice of Cassibile he joined the Italian Social Republic, joining the National Republican Army where in 1944 he was given command of the 203rd Regional Military Command, with headquarters in Padua. For this, after the end of the war he was dismissed from the Army. He died in his native Salsomaggiore Terme on 24 May 1977.
