= 45th Infantry Regiment "Reggio" =

Active Italian Army infantry unit

- 45° Reggimento Fanteria "Reggio"
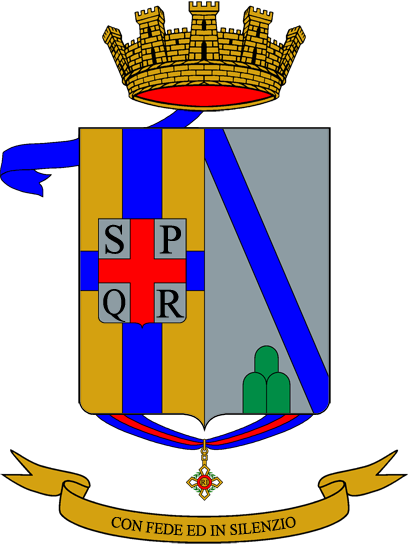
- Regimental coat of arms
- Active: 1 July 1859 – 15 June 1955; 1 Feb. 1977 – 31 Dec. 2002; 1 Oct. 2022 – today
- Country: Italy
- Branch: Italian Army
- Part of: Mechanized Brigade "Sassari"
- Garrison/HQ: Sassari
- Motto: "Con fede ed in silenzio"
- Anniversaries: 17 December 1917 – Battle of Monte Valderoa
- Decorations: 1× Military Order of Italy; 1× Bronze Medal of Military Valor

Insignia
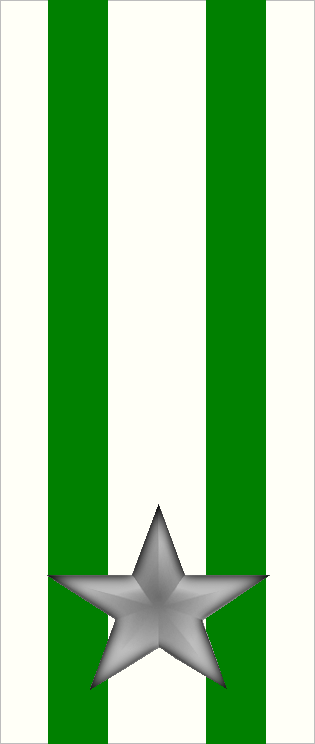
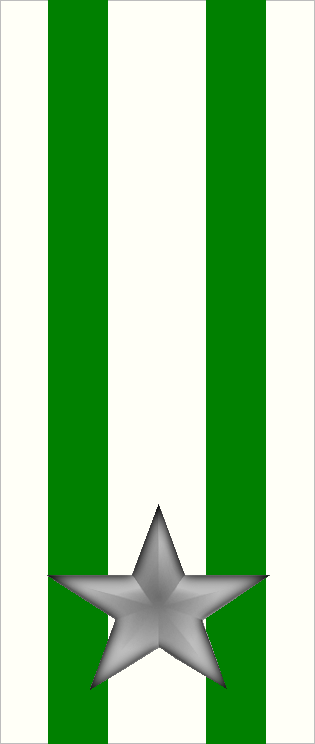
- Regimental gorget patches

The 45th Infantry Regiment "Reggio" (Italian: 45° Reggimento Fanteria "Reggio") is an active unit of the Italian Army based in Sassari in Sardinia. The unit is named for the city of Reggio Emilia and part of the Italian Army's infantry arm. On 1 October 2022, the name, flag and traditions of the regiment were assigned to the Command and Tactical Supports Unit "Sassari" of the Mechanized Brigade "Sassari". On the same day the unit was renamed 45th Command and Tactical Supports Unit "Reggio". On 1 July 1859, during the Second Italian War of Independence, a Volunteer Battalion was formed in Modena. By 29 July, three volunteer battalions had been formed and the three battalions were used to form the 3rd Infantry Regiment. In August 1860, the regiment was assigned, together with the 4th Infantry Regiment, to the newly formed Brigade "Reggio" of the Army of the League of Central Italy. On 1 January 1860, the 3rd Infantry Regiment was renumbered 45th Infantry Regiment, and on 25 March 1860, the regiment joined the Royal Sardinian Army.

In 1866, the regiment participated in the Third Italian War of Independence and in 1870 in the capture of Rome. In World War I the regiment fought on the Italian front. During World War II, the regiment was assigned to the 30th Infantry Division "Sabauda", with which it fought briefly against German forces after the Armistice of Cassibile was announced on 8 September 1943. The regiment then joined the Italian Co-belligerent Army and served for the remainder of the war as an internal security unit. In 1948, the regiment joined the Infantry Division "Aosta" and seven years later, in 1955, the regiment was disbanded.

In 1977, the regiment's flag and traditions were assigned to the 45th Infantry Battalion "Arborea", which had been formed in Macomer on Sardinia as a recruits training unit. In 1993, the battalion lost its autonomy and entered the 45th Regiment "Reggio". On 31 December 2002, the 45th Regiment "Reggio" was disbanded and the next day its personnel used to reform the 5th Engineer Regiment. The regiment's anniversary falls on 17 December 1917, the day during the First Battle of Monte Grappa the Brigade "Reggio" withstood heavy Austro-Hungarian attacks on Monte Valderoa, for which both regiments of the Brigade "Reggio" were awarded a Bronze Medal of Military Valor.

== History ==
=== Formation ===
On 21 July 1858, French Emperor Napoleon III and the Prime Minister of Sardinia Camillo Benso, Count of Cavour met in Plombières and reached a secret verbal agreement on a military alliance between the Second French Empire and the Kingdom of Sardinia against the Austrian Empire. On 26 January 1859, Napoleon III signed the Franco-Sardinian Treaty, followed by King Victor Emmanuel II on 29 January 1859. On 9 March 1859, Sardinia mobilized its army, followed by Austria on 9 April. On 23 April, Austria delivered an ultimatum to Sardinia demanding its demobilization. Upon Sardinia's refusal, Austria declared war on 26 April and three days later the Austrians crossed the Ticino river into Piedmont. Consequently France honored its alliance with Sardinia and declared war on Austria on 3 May 1859.

On 2 June 1859, French and Sardinian forces crossed the Ticino river and on 4 June defeated the Austrians in the Battle of Magenta. As a consequence of the Austrian defeat Duke Francis V fled the Duchy of Modena and Reggio on 11 June. He left behind a caretaker government, which was overthrown on 14 June by the citizens of Modena. On 19 June 1859, Royal Sardinian Army units arrived in the duchy and the next day the Piedmontese politician Luigi Carlo Farini took over the government of the duchy as dictator.

On 1 July 1859, a Volunteer Battalion was formed in Modena with volunteers, who had arrived from the Kingdom of Lombardy–Venetia, the Grand Duchy of Tuscany, and the Papal Legations. On 12 July 1859, the Second Italian War of Independence ended with the Armistice of Villafranca, which called for the rulers of the Grand Duchy of Tuscany, the Duchy of Modena and Reggio, and the Duchy of Parma and Piacenza, which all had fled their nations, to be restored to their thrones. However neither Sardinia nor the citizens of Modena wished for a return of Francis V. On 29 July, the three volunteer battalions, which had been formed in Modena until then, were used to form the 3rd Infantry Regiment. On 8 August 1859, a fourth Volunteer Battalion was formed in Modena, which was soon joined by another two volunteer battalions. These three battalions were used to form the 4th Infantry Regiment, which was then assigned with the 3rd Infantry Regiment to the newly formed Brigade "Reggio".

On 10 August 1859, the Duchy of Modena and Reggio joined the United Provinces of Central Italy, which then decided to form the Army of the League of Central Italy. Consequently the Brigade "Reggio" with its two regiment was assigned to the Army of the League of Central Italy. On 30 November 1859, the Duchy of Parma and Piacenza, Duchy of Modena and Reggio, and the Papal Legations of the Romagne were united under the Royal Government of Emilia, which on 1 January 1860 was redesignated as the Royal Provinces of Emilia. On the same date, the 3rd and 4th infantry regiments took their place in the progressive numerical order of the regiments of the Royal Sardinian Army and became the 45th Infantry Regiment (Brigade "Reggio") and 46th Infantry Regiment (Brigade "Reggio"). On 11 and 12 March 1860, the Royal Provinces of Emilia voted in a plebiscite for annexation by the Kingdom of Sardinia. On 18 March 1860, the annexation act was presented to Victor Emmanuel II and one week later, on 25 March 1860, the Brigade "Reggio" and its two regiments were formally incorporated into the Royal Sardinian Army.

=== Third Italian War of Independence ===
After the successful conclusion of Garibaldi's Expedition of the Thousand the Kingdom of Sardinia annexed the Kingdom of the Two Sicilies. On 17 March 1861, King Victor Emmanuel II proclaimed himself King of Italy. On 1 August 1862, the two regiments of the Brigade "Reggio" ceded their 17th Company and 18th Company to help form the 66th Infantry Regiment (Brigade "Valtellina"). During the same year the two regiments moved to Isernia respectively Salerno in Southern Italy to suppress the anti-Sardinian revolt, which had erupted in Southern Italy after the annexation of the Kingdom of the Two Sicilies.

In 1866, the Brigade "Reggio" participated in the Third Italian War of Independence. In September 1870 the brigade participated in the capture of Rome. On 25 October 1871, the brigade level was abolished, and the two regiments of the Brigade "Reggio" were renamed 45th Infantry Regiment "Reggio", respectively 46th Infantry Regiment "Reggio". On 2 January 1881, the brigade level was reintroduced, and the two regiments were renamed again as 45th Infantry Regiment (Brigade "Reggio") and 46th Infantry Regiment (Brigade "Reggio"). On 1 November 1884, the 45th Infantry Regiment ceded some of its companies to help form the 87th Infantry Regiment (Brigade "Friuli"). In 1895–96, the regiment provided seven officers and 289 enlisted for units deployed to Italian Eritrea for the First Italo-Ethiopian War. In 1908, the regiment moved from Naples to Sassari on the island of Sardinia. In 1911–12, the regiment provided volunteers to augment units deployed to Libya for the Italo-Turkish War.

=== World War I ===
At the outbreak of World War I, the Brigade "Reggio" formed, together with the Brigade "Torino" and the 13th Field Artillery Regiment, the 17th Division. At the time the 45th Infantry Regiment consisted of three battalions, each of which fielded four fusilier companies and one machine gun section. At the outbreak of World War I, the 45th Infantry Regiment consisted of three battalions, each of which fielded four fusilier companies and one machine gun section. On 1 March 1915, the depot of the 45th Infantry Regiment in Sassari formed the command of the Brigade "Sassari" and the 152nd Infantry Regiment (Brigade "Sassari"), while the depot of the 46th Infantry Regiment in Cagliari formed the 151st Infantry Regiment (Brigade "Sassari"). After Italy's entry into the war on 23 May 1915, the Brigade "Reggio" was deployed in the Tofane group in the Dolomites. The brigade quickly occupied Falzarego Pass and for the rest of the year fought against Austro-Hungarian troops, which occupied the summits of the Tofane group and the Lagazuoi: on 11 July troops of the 45th Infantry Regiment and the Alpini Battalion "Belluno" conquered the summit of Col dei Bos, and on 18 October the 45th Infantry Regiment managed to conquer the summit of Cima Falzarego, while the 46th Infantry Regiment attacked the Austro-Hungarian positions on the Sass de Stria.

In 1916, the brigade was sent to the Col di Lana sector, where the brigade, in cooperation with the Brigade "Calabria", repeatedly attacked the Austro-Hungarian positions on Monte Sief. In 1917, the brigade remained in the Col di Lana – Monte Sief sector until the Battle of Caporetto forced the Italians to retreat behind the Piave river. On 2 November 1917, the Brigade "Reggio" received the order to retreat to the new Italian lines. While the brigade retreated to the Piave river, the 46th Infantry Regiment's I Battalion and III Battalion formed the rearguard. On 8 November, the brigade entered the new frontline on the Piave river's Southern bank between Pederobba and Vidor. The next day the two battalions left behind as rearguard, were surrounded and destroyed by advancing Austro-Hungarian troops near Vignole. From 13 to 26 November 1917, the brigade fought in the First Battle of the Piave River. On 6 December 1917, the Brigade "Reggio" was replaced on the front by French forces. On 12 December 1917, the brigade was sent to reinforce Italian units fighting in the First Battle of Monte Grappa on the Monte Grappa massif. On the Monte Grappa the brigade took up positions between Monte Solarolo and Monte Valderoa, where on 17 December 1917, the 45th Infantry Regiment came under heavy enemy attacks, which were all repulsed. On 28 December 1917, the brigade, which had suffered 3,074 casualties since 2 November, was sent to the rear to be rebuilt.

In June 1918, during the Second Battle of the Piave River, the 46th Infantry Regiment held the Italian lines on the Montello, while the 45th Infantry Regiment was one of the reserve units of the XXVII Army Corps. On 15 June 1918, Austro-Hungarian forces crossed the Piave river on the Northern side of the Montello and the next day the 45th Infantry Regiment was sent forward to counterattack. Over the next nine days the regiment drove the enemy forces back over the river. During the decisive Battle of Vittorio Veneto the Brigade "Reggio" crossed the Piave river at Grave di Ciano on 29 October. The brigade then pursued the retreating enemy up the Piave valley and the Cordevole valley, defeated enemy rearguards at Mas and at Noach, and then liberated Agordo and Cencenighe.

For their conduct during the war both regiments of the Brigade "Reggio" were awarded a Bronze Medal of Military Valor. The medals were affixed to the two regiments' flags and added to their coat of arms.

=== Interwar years ===
On 31 October 1926, the Brigade "Reggio" was renamed XXX Infantry Brigade. The brigade was the infantry component of the 30th Territorial Division of Cagliari, which also included the 16th Field Artillery Regiment. On the same date the brigade's two infantry regiments were renamed 45th Infantry Regiment "Reggio" and 46th Infantry Regiment "Reggio". On 30 November 1926, the Brigade "Calabria" and the 60th Infantry Regiment (Brigade "Calabria") were disbanded. The next day the 59th Infantry Regiment "Calabria" was assigned to the XXX Infantry Brigade. In 1927, the 59th Infantry Regiment "Calabria" moved from Civitavecchia to La Maddalena in the north of Sardinia.

In 1934, the 30th Territorial Division of Cagliari was renamed Military Command Cagliari – 30th Infantry Division "Sabauda" and in September of the same year the Military Command Sassari – 31st Infantry Division "Caprera" was formed. The Military Command Cagliari was based in Cagliari and responsible for the South of the island of Sardinia, while the Military Command Sassari was based in Sassari and responsible for the island's North. The same month the XXXI Infantry Brigade "Caprera" was formed and assigned to the 31st Infantry Division "Caprera". The XXX Infantry Brigade "Sabauda" then transferred the 45th Infantry Regiment "Reggio" and 59th Infantry Regiment "Calabria" to the newly formed brigade. To bring the XXX Infantry Brigade "Sabauda" back up to strength the 60th Infantry Regiment "Calabria" was reformed in Iglesias with personnel drawn from the 45th, 46th, and 59th infantry regiments.

In 1935–36 the 45th Infantry Regiment "Reggio" provided nine officers and 171 troops to units deployed to East Africa for the Second Italo-Ethiopian War. On 15 April 1939, the 45th Infantry Regiment "Reggio" in Sassari and the 60th Infantry Regiment "Calabria" in Iglesias switched names. On the same day the XXX Infantry Brigade "Sabauda" was disbanded and the 45th Infantry Regiment "Reggio" and 46th Infantry Regiment "Reggio" were both renamed "Sabauda" and came under direct command of the 30th Infantry Division "Sabauda". The division, which also included the 16th Artillery Regiment "Sabauda", was tasked with the defense of the Southern half of Sardinia.

=== World War II ===
At the outbreak of World War II, the 45th Infantry Regiment "Sabauda" consisted of a command, a command company, three fusilier battalions, a support weapons battery equipped with 65/17 infantry support guns, and a mortar company equipped with 81mm Mod. 35 mortars. The "Sabauda" division and its regiments remained in Sardinia on coastal defense duty until the Armistice of Cassibile was announced on 8 September 1943. On 10 September 1943, the division repositioned itself along the Villacidro-Samassi-Selegas-Suelli line to deflect an expected attack by the German 90th Panzergrenadier Division. However the Wehrmacht decided to evacuate its forces to Corsica and the Italian units in Southern Sardinia allowed the Germans to withdraw.

The "Sabauda" division then joined the Italian Co-belligerent Army. On 10 November 1943, the division command, together with the 45th Infantry Regiment "Sabauda" and 16th Artillery Regiment "Sabauda", left Sardinia and moved to Sicily, where the division initially took up positions in the Enna-Caltanissetta region. In September 1944, the division relocated to the Messina-Catania-Syracuse area, where the division was joined by the 46th Infantry Regiment "Sabauda". On 1 October 1944, the "Sabauda" division was reorganized and renamed Internal Security Division "Sabauda". On the same date the battalions of the 45th Infantry Regiment "Sabauda" were used to form three internal security regiments: the regiment's I Battalion and the command of the 45th Infantry Regiment "Sabauda" formed the 45th Internal Security Regiment "Sabauda", while the regiment's II Battalion and the command of the 46th Infantry Regiment "Sabauda" formed the 46th Internal Security Regiment "Sabauda". The regiment's III Battalion and minor units of the "Sabauda" division formed the 145th Internal Security Regiment. For the rest of the war the division was tasked with the defence of Mediterranean Allied Air Forces airfields on Sicily; as well as public security and demining.

=== Cold War ===
After the war the 45th Internal Security Regiment "Sabauda" was based in Catania, while the 46th Internal Security Regiment "Sabauda" was based in Messina. On 15 August 1946, the Internal Security Division "Sabauda" was disbanded and its command used to reform the Infantry Brigade "Reggio". On the same date the 45th and 46th internal security regiments were renamed 45th Infantry Regiment "Reggio" respectively 46th Infantry Regiment "Reggio". In 1947, the 46th Infantry Regiment "Reggio" left the brigade and moved from Messina to Rome, where the regiment joined the Infantry Division "Granatieri di Sardegna". On 1 February 1948, the Infantry Brigade "Reggio" was disbanded and the 45th Infantry Regiment "Reggio" was assigned to the Infantry Division "Aosta". On 15 June 1955, the 45th Infantry Regiment "Reggio" was disbanded and the regiment's flag transferred to the Shrine of the Flags in the Vittoriano in Rome.

During the 1975 army reform, the army disbanded the regimental level and newly independent battalions were granted for the first time their own flags. On 31 December 1975, the 152nd Infantry Regiment "Sassari" in Sardinia was disbanded and the next day the regiment's II Battalion in Cagliari was renamed 151st Infantry Battalion "Sette Comuni", while the regiment's III Battalion in Macomer was reduced to a detachment of the 151st Infantry Battalion "Sette Comuni". On 1 February 1977, the detachment of the 151st Infantry Battalion "Sette Comuni" in Macomer became an autonomous unit and was renamed 45th Infantry Battalion "Arborea". To avoid confusion with the 46th Infantry Battalion "Reggio" the battalion's name was changed from "Reggio" to "Arborea", which commemorated the Kingdom of Arborea that ruled Sardinia from 1368 to 1388 and 1392 to 1409. The battalion was assigned to the Sardinia Military Command and consisted of a command, a command platoon, and two recruit companies. On 14 March 1977, the President of the Italian Republic Giovanni Leone assigned with decree 173 the flag and traditions of the 45th Infantry Regiment "Reggio" to the 45th Infantry Battalion "Arborea".

=== Recent times ===
On 31 August 1993, the 45th Infantry Battalion "Arborea" lost its autonomy and the next day the battalion entered the 45th Regiment "Reggio". The regiment then joined the Mechanized Brigade "Sassari" and was tasked with training the brigade's recruits. On 31 December 2002, the 45th Regiment "Reggio" was disbanded and the next day its personnel was used to the reform the 5th Engineer Regiment. Afterwards the flag of the 45th Infantry Regiment "Reggio" was transferred to the Shrine of the Flags in the Vittoriano in Rome.

=== Reactivation ===
On 1 October 2022, the flag and traditions of the 45th Infantry Regiment "Reggio" were assigned to the Command and Tactical Supports Unit "Sassari" of the Mechanized Brigade "Sassari". On the same day the unit was renamed 45th Command and Tactical Supports Unit "Reggio".

== Organization ==
As of 2024 the unit is organized as follows:

- 45th Command and Tactical Supports Unit "Reggio", in Sassari
  - Command and Logistic Support Company
  - Signal Company

== See also ==
- Mechanized Brigade "Sassari"
