= 46th Infantry Regiment "Reggio" =

Inactive Italian Army infantry unit

- 46° Reggimento Fanteria "Reggio"
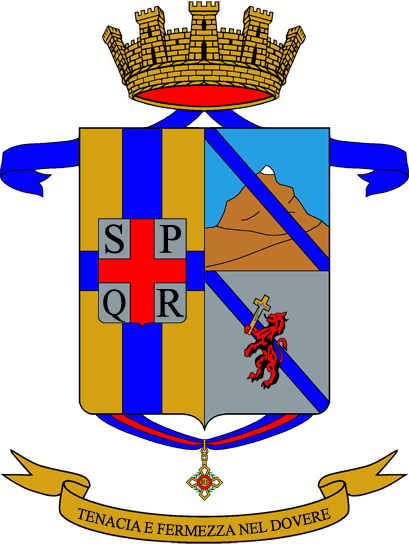
- Regimental coat of arms
- Active: 8 Aug. 1859 – 3 Oct. 1974; 15 Nov. 1975 – 14 Feb. 1978
- Country: Italy
- Branch: Italian Army
- Garrison/HQ: Palermo
- Motto: "Tenacia e fermezza nel dovere"
- Anniversaries: 17 December 1917 – Battle of Monte Valderoa
- Decorations: 2× Military Order of Italy; 2× Bronze Medals of Military Valor

Insignia
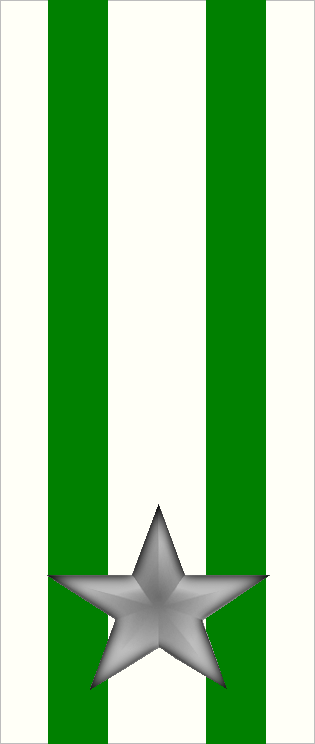
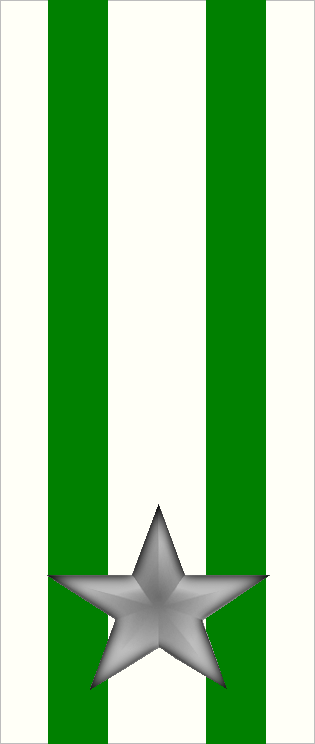
- Regimental gorget patches

The 46th Infantry Regiment "Reggio" (Italian: 46° Reggimento Fanteria "Reggio") is an inactive unit of the Italian Army last based in Palermo. The regiment is named for the city of Reggio Emilia and part of the Italian Army's infantry arm. On 8 August 1859, a Volunteer Battalion was formed in Modena, which soon was assigned with two other volunteer battalions to the newly formed 4th Infantry Regiment. The new regiment was assigned, together with the 3rd Infantry Regiment, to the newly formed Brigade "Reggio" of the Army of the League of Central Italy. On 1 January 1860, the 4th Infantry Regiment was renumbered 46th Infantry Regiment, and on 25 March 1860, the regiment joined the Royal Sardinian Army.

In 1866, the regiment participated in the Third Italian War of Independence and in 1870 in the capture of Rome. In World War I the regiment fought on the Italian front. In 1935–36 the regiment fought in the Second Italo-Ethiopian War. During World War II, the regiment was assigned to the 30th Infantry Division "Sabauda", with which it fought briefly against German forces after the Armistice of Cassibile was announced on 8 September 1943. The regiment then joined the Italian Co-belligerent Army and served for the remainder of the war as an internal security unit.

In 1947, the regiment moved to Rome, where it joined the Infantry Division "Granatieri di Sardegna". In 1959, the regiment was disbanded in Sulmona in Abruzzo and then reformed in Palermo in Sicily as a recruits training unit. In 1974, the regiment was disbanded and in 1975 the regiment's flag and traditions were assigned to the 46th Infantry Battalion "Reggio". In 1978, the battalion was disbanded and the flag of the 46th Infantry Regiment "Reggio" transferred to the Shrine of the Flags in the Vittoriano in Rome. The regiment's anniversary falls on 17 December 1917, the day during the First Battle of Monte Grappa the Brigade "Reggio" withstood heavy Austro-Hungarian attacks on Monte Valderoa, for which both regiments of the Brigade "Reggio" were awarded a Bronze Medal of Military Valor.

== History ==
=== Formation ===
On 21 July 1858, French Emperor Napoleon III and the Prime Minister of Sardinia Camillo Benso, Count of Cavour met in Plombières and reached a secret verbal agreement on a military alliance between the Second French Empire and the Kingdom of Sardinia against the Austrian Empire. On 26 January 1859, Napoleon III signed the Franco-Sardinian Treaty, followed by King Victor Emmanuel II on 29 January 1859. On 9 March 1859, Sardinia mobilized its army, followed by Austria on 9 April. On 23 April, Austria delivered an ultimatum to Sardinia demanding its demobilization. Upon Sardinia's refusal, Austria declared war on 26 April and three days later the Austrians crossed the Ticino river into Piedmont. Consequently France honored its alliance with Sardinia and declared war on Austria on 3 May 1859.

On 2 June 1859, French and Sardinian forces crossed the Ticino river and on 4 June defeated the Austrians in the Battle of Magenta. As a consequence of the Austrian defeat Duke Francis V fled the Duchy of Modena and Reggio on 11 June. He left behind a caretaker government, which was overthrown on 14 June by the citizens of Modena. On 19 June 1859, Royal Sardinian Army units arrived in the duchy and the next day the Piedmontese politician Luigi Carlo Farini took over the government of the duchy as dictator.

On 1 July 1859, a Volunteer Battalion was formed in Modena with volunteers, who had arrived from the Kingdom of Lombardy–Venetia, the Grand Duchy of Tuscany, and the Papal Legations. On 12 July 1859, the Second Italian War of Independence ended with the Armistice of Villafranca, which called for the rulers of the Grand Duchy of Tuscany, the Duchy of Modena and Reggio, and the Duchy of Parma and Piacenza, which all had fled their nations, to be restored to their thrones. However neither Sardinia nor the citizens of Modena wished for a return of Francis V. On 29 July, the three volunteer battalions, which had been formed in Modena until then, were used to form the 3rd Infantry Regiment. On 8 August 1859, a fourth Volunteer Battalion was formed in Modena, which was soon joined by another two volunteer battalions. These three battalions were used to form the 4th Infantry Regiment, which was then assigned with the 3rd Infantry Regiment to the newly formed Brigade "Reggio".

On 10 August 1859, the Duchy of Modena and Reggio joined the United Provinces of Central Italy, which then decided to form the Army of the League of Central Italy. Consequently the Brigade "Reggio" with its two regiment was assigned to the Army of the League of Central Italy. On 30 November 1859, the Duchy of Parma and Piacenza, Duchy of Modena and Reggio, and the Papal Legations of the Romagne were united under the Royal Government of Emilia, which on 1 January 1860 was redesignated as the Royal Provinces of Emilia. On the same date, the 3rd and 4th infantry regiments took their place in the progressive numerical order of the regiments of the Royal Sardinian Army and became the 45th Infantry Regiment (Brigade "Reggio") and 46th Infantry Regiment (Brigade "Reggio"). On 11 and 12 March 1860, the Royal Provinces of Emilia voted in a plebiscite for annexation by the Kingdom of Sardinia. On 18 March 1860, the annexation act was presented to Victor Emmanuel II and one week later, on 25 March 1860, the Brigade "Reggio" and its two regiments were formally incorporated into the Royal Sardinian Army.

=== Third Italian War of Independence ===
After the successful conclusion of Garibaldi's Expedition of the Thousand the Kingdom of Sardinia annexed the Kingdom of the Two Sicilies. On 17 March 1861, King Victor Emmanuel II proclaimed himself King of Italy. On 1 August 1862, the two regiments of the Brigade "Reggio" ceded their 17th Company and 18th Company to help form the 66th Infantry Regiment (Brigade "Valtellina"). During the same year the two regiments moved to Isernia respectively Salerno in Southern Italy to suppress the anti-Sardinian revolt, which had erupted in Southern Italy after the annexation of the Kingdom of the Two Sicilies.

In 1866, the Brigade "Reggio" participated in the Third Italian War of Independence. In September 1870 the brigade participated in the capture of Rome. On 25 October 1871, the brigade level was abolished, and the two regiments of the Brigade "Reggio" were renamed 45th Infantry Regiment "Reggio", respectively 46th Infantry Regiment "Reggio". On 2 January 1881, the brigade level was reintroduced, and the two regiments were renamed again as 45th Infantry Regiment (Brigade "Reggio") and 46th Infantry Regiment (Brigade "Reggio"). On 1 November 1884, the 46th Infantry Regiment ceded some of its companies to help form the 88th Infantry Regiment (Brigade "Friuli"). In 1895–96, the regiment provided nine officers and 270 enlisted for units deployed to Italian Eritrea for the First Italo-Ethiopian War. In 1908, the regiment moved from Naples to Cagliari on the island of Sardinia. In 1911–12, the regiment provided volunteers to augment units deployed to Libya for the Italo-Turkish War.

=== World War I ===
At the outbreak of World War I, the Brigade "Reggio" formed, together with the Brigade "Torino" and the 13th Field Artillery Regiment, the 17th Division. At the time the 46th Infantry Regiment consisted of three battalions, each of which fielded four fusilier companies and one machine gun section. On 1 March 1915, the depot of the 45th Infantry Regiment in Sassari formed the command of the Brigade "Sassari" and the 152nd Infantry Regiment (Brigade "Sassari"), while the depot of the 46th Infantry Regiment in Cagliari formed the 151st Infantry Regiment (Brigade "Sassari"). After Italy's entry into the war on 23 May 1915, the Brigade "Reggio" was deployed in the Tofane group in the Dolomites. The brigade quickly occupied Falzarego Pass and for the rest of the year fought against Austro-Hungarian troops, which occupied the summits of the Tofane group and the Lagazuoi: on 11 July troops of the 45th Infantry Regiment and the Alpini Battalion "Belluno" conquered the summit of Col dei Bos, and on 18 October the 45th Infantry Regiment managed to conquer the summit of Cima Falzarego, while the 46th Infantry Regiment attacked the Austro-Hungarian positions on the Sass de Stria.

In 1916, the brigade was sent to the Col di Lana sector, where the brigade, in cooperation with the Brigade "Calabria", repeatedly attacked the Austro-Hungarian positions on Monte Sief. In 1917, the brigade remained in the Col di Lana – Monte Sief sector until the Battle of Caporetto forced the Italians to retreat behind the Piave river. On 2 November 1917, the Brigade "Reggio" received the order to retreat to the new Italian lines. While the brigade retreated to the Piave river, the 46th Infantry Regiment's I Battalion and III Battalion formed the rearguard. On 8 November, the brigade entered the new frontline on the Piave river's Southern bank between Pederobba and Vidor. The next day the two battalions left behind as rearguard, were surrounded and destroyed by advancing Austro-Hungarian troops near Vignole. From 13 to 26 November 1917, the brigade fought in the First Battle of the Piave River. On 6 December 1917, the Brigade "Reggio" was replaced on the front by French forces. On 12 December 1917, the brigade was sent to reinforce Italian units fighting in the First Battle of Monte Grappa on the Monte Grappa massif. On the Monte Grappa the brigade took up positions between Monte Solarolo and Monte Valderoa, where on 17 December 1917, the 45th Infantry Regiment came under heavy enemy attacks, which were all repulsed. On 28 December 1917, the brigade, which had suffered 3,074 casualties since 2 November, was sent to the rear to be rebuilt.

In June 1918, during the Second Battle of the Piave River, the 46th Infantry Regiment held the Italian lines on the Montello, while the 45th Infantry Regiment was one of the reserve units of the XXVII Army Corps. On 15 June 1918, Austro-Hungarian forces crossed the Piave river on the Northern side of the Montello and the next day the 45th Infantry Regiment was sent forward to counterattack. Over the next nine days the regiment drove the enemy forces back over the river. During the decisive Battle of Vittorio Veneto the Brigade "Reggio" crossed the Piave river at Grave di Ciano on 29 October. The brigade then pursued the retreating enemy up the Piave valley and the Cordevole valley, defeated enemy rearguards at Mas and at Noach, and then liberated Agordo and Cencenighe.

For their conduct during the war both regiments of the Brigade "Reggio" were awarded a Bronze Medal of Military Valor. The medals were affixed to the two regiments' flags and added to their coat of arms.

=== Interwar years ===
On 31 October 1926, the Brigade "Reggio" was renamed XXX Infantry Brigade. The brigade was the infantry component of the 30th Territorial Division of Cagliari, which also included the 16th Field Artillery Regiment. On the same date the brigade's two infantry regiments were renamed 45th Infantry Regiment "Reggio" and 46th Infantry Regiment "Reggio". On 30 November 1926, the Brigade "Calabria" and the 60th Infantry Regiment (Brigade "Calabria") were disbanded. The next day the 59th Infantry Regiment "Calabria" was assigned to the XXX Infantry Brigade. In 1927, the 59th Infantry Regiment "Calabria" moved from Civitavecchia to La Maddalena in the North of Sardinia.

In 1934, the 30th Territorial Division of Cagliari was renamed Military Command Cagliari – 30th Infantry Division "Sabauda" and in September of the same year the Military Command Sassari – 31st Infantry Division "Caprera" was formed. The Military Command Cagliari was based in Cagliari and responsible for the South of the island of Sardinia, while the Military Command Sassari was based in Sassari and responsible for the island's North. The same month the XXXI Infantry Brigade "Caprera" was formed and assigned to the 31st Infantry Division "Caprera". The XXX Infantry Brigade "Sabauda" then transferred the 45th Infantry Regiment "Reggio" and 59th Infantry Regiment "Calabria" to the newly formed brigade. To bring the XXX Infantry Brigade "Sabauda" back up to strength the 60th Infantry Regiment "Calabria" was reformed in Iglesias with personnel drawn from the 45th, 46th, and 59th infantry regiments.

=== Second Italo-Ethiopian War ===
In 1935–36, the 30th Infantry Division "Sabauda", including the 46th Infantry Regiment "Reggio", participated in the Second Italo-Ethiopian War. On 21 June 1935, the division arrived in Massawa in Eritrea. Initially the "Sabauda" division was tasked with border defence duties in the Asmara-Dek’emhāre area. At the outbreak of the war on 3 October 1935 the division held a defensive line near Barachit and after overcoming initial Ethiopian resistance at Fik’ada it advanced rapidly into Ethiopian territory. In November 1935, the "Sabauda" division took Negash, Agula and Bolbala and then moved to positions on the heights overlooking the Tekezé river during the Ethiopian Christmas Offensive. On 6 January 1936, the division resumed its advance only to stop for all of February 1936 in Enderta Province. On 13–27 February 1936, the "Sabauda" division fought in the Battle of Amba Aradam, during which the 46th Infantry Regiment "Reggio" defeated a heavy enemy attack on 13 February 1936. On 3 April 1936, the division arrived at Amba Alagi, where it won a decisive encounter and pursued the retreating Ethiopians to Agumserta and finally to Lake Ashenge. With the way to Addis Ababa open, the division surged forward, reaching Shewa Kifle Hāger village on the capital's outskirts on 26 April 1936, and captured Addis Ababa itself on 5 May 1936.

In following months the regiment's battalions battled Ethiopian forces and rebels, which operated near Addis Ababa. The "Sabauda" division remained in the Ethiopian capital until December 1936, when it began its return to Sardinia. For its service in Ethiopia between 3 October 1935 and 5 May 1936 the 46th Infantry Regiment "Reggio" was awarded, like all infantry units, which had participated in the war, a Military Order of Italy, which was affixed to the regiment's flag. Additionally the regiment was awarded a Bronze Medal of Military Valor for its conduct on 13 February 1936, during the Battle of Amba Aradam. The medal was affixed to the regiment's flag and added to the regiment's coat of arms.

On 15 April 1939, the 45th Infantry Regiment "Reggio" in Sassari and the 60th Infantry Regiment "Calabria" in Iglesias switched names. On the same day the XXX Infantry Brigade was disbanded and the 45th Infantry Regiment "Reggio" and 46th Infantry Regiment "Reggio" came under direct command of the 30th Infantry Division "Sabauda". The division, which also included the 16th Artillery Regiment "Sabauda", was tasked with the defense of the Southern half of Sardinia.

=== World War II ===
At the outbreak of World War II, the 46th Infantry Regiment "Sabauda" consisted of a command, a command company, three fusilier battalions, a support weapons battery equipped with 65/17 infantry support guns, and a mortar company equipped with 81mm Mod. 35 mortars. The "Sabauda" division and its regiments remained in Sardinia on coastal defense duty until the Armistice of Cassibile was announced on 8 September 1943. On 10 September 1943, the division repositioned itself along the Villacidro-Samassi-Selegas-Suelli line to deflect an expected attack by the German 90th Panzergrenadier Division. However the Wehrmacht decided to evacuate its forces to Corsica and the Italian units in Southern Sardinia allowed the Germans to withdraw.

The "Sabauda" division then joined the Italian Co-belligerent Army. On 10 November 1943, the division command, together with the 45th Infantry Regiment "Sabauda" and 16th Artillery Regiment "Sabauda", left Sardinia and moved to Sicily, where the division initially took up positions in the Enna-Caltanissetta region. In September 1944, the division relocated to the Messina-Catania-Syracuse area, where the division was joined by the 46th Infantry Regiment "Sabauda". On 1 October 1944, the "Sabauda" division was reorganized and renamed Internal Security Division "Sabauda". On the same date the battalions of the 46th Infantry Regiment "Sabauda" were used to form three internal security regiments for the Internal Security Division "Aosta": the regiment's I Battalion formed the 5th Internal Security Regiment "Aosta", while the regiment's II Battalion formed the 6th Internal Security Regiment "Aosta". The regiment's III Battalion and minor units of the "Sabauda" division formed the 139th Internal Security Regiment. On the same day the command of the 46th Infantry Regiment "Sabauda" and the II Battalion of the 45th Infantry Regiment "Sabauda" formed the 46th Internal Security Regiment "Sabauda", which was assigned to the Internal Security Division "Sabauda". For the rest of the war the division was tasked with the defence of Mediterranean Allied Air Forces airfields on Sicily; as well as public security and demining.

=== Cold War ===
After the war the 45th Internal Security Regiment "Sabauda" was based in Catania, while the 46th Internal Security Regiment "Sabauda" was based in Messina. On 15 August 1946, the Internal Security Division "Sabauda" was disbanded and its command used to reform the Infantry Brigade "Reggio". On the same date the 45th and 46th internal security regiments were renamed 45th Infantry Regiment "Reggio" respectively 46th Infantry Regiment "Reggio". In 1947, the 46th Infantry Regiment "Reggio" left the brigade and moved from Messina to Rome, where the regiment joined on 1 April 1948 the reformed Infantry Division "Granatieri di Sardegna". On 1 September 1949, the regiment moved from Rome to Sulmona.

On 15 June 1955, the 45th Infantry Regiment "Reggio" was disbanded and the regiment's flag transferred to the Shrine of the Flags in the Vittoriano in Rome. On 31 January 1959, the 46th Infantry Regiment "Reggio" was disbanded in Sulmona and its battalions merged into the 17th Infantry Regiment "Acqui", which took over the base of the disbanded regiment in Sulmona. The next day, on 1 February 1959, the 46th Infantry Regiment "Reggio" was reformed by renaming the existing 11th Recruits Training Center in Palermo. The regiment consisted of command, a command company, and three recruit battalions.

On 3 October 1974, the regiment and its II and III battalions were disbanded. The next day the regiment's I Battalion was renamed Recruits Training Battalion "Reggio". The battalion received the regiment's flag for safekeeping. During the 1975 army reform, the army disbanded the regimental level and newly independent battalions were granted for the first time their own flags. On 15 November 1975, the Recruits Training Battalion "Reggio" was renamed 46th Infantry Battalion "Reggio". The battalion was assigned to the Motorized Brigade "Aosta" and tasked with training the brigade's recruits. The battalion consisted of a command, a command platoon, and four recruit companies. On 12 November 1976, the President of the Italian Republic Giovanni Leone assigned with decree 846 the flag and traditions of the 46th Infantry Regiment "Reggio" to the 46th Infantry Battalion "Reggio".

On 14 February 1978, the 46th Infantry Battalion "Reggio" was disbanded and the flag of the 46th Infantry Regiment "Reggio" transferred to the Shrine of the Flags in the Vittoriano in Rome.
