= 60th Infantry Regiment "Calabria" =

Inactive Italian Army infantry unit

- 60° Reggimento Fanteria "Calabria"
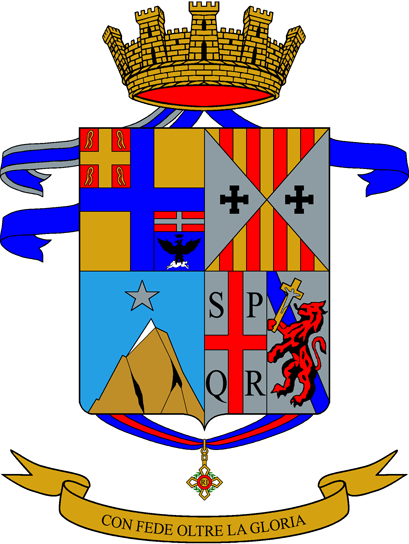
- Regimental coat of arms
- Active: 16 April 1861 – 28 Feb. 1958; 1 July 1958 – 31 Dec. 1974; 15 Nov. 1975 – 31 May 2005
- Country: Italy
- Branch: Italian Army
- Part of: Sicily Military Region
- Garrison/HQ: Trapani
- Motto: "Con fede oltre la gloria"
- Anniversaries: 22 November 1917 – Battle of Monte Tomba
- Decorations: 2× Military Order of Italy; 1× Silver Medal of Military Valor; 2× Bronze Medals of Military Valor

Insignia
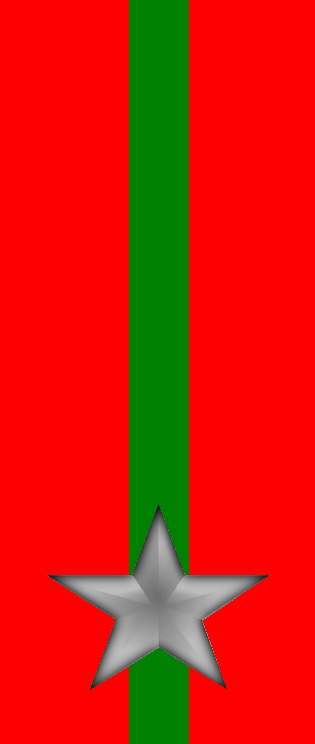
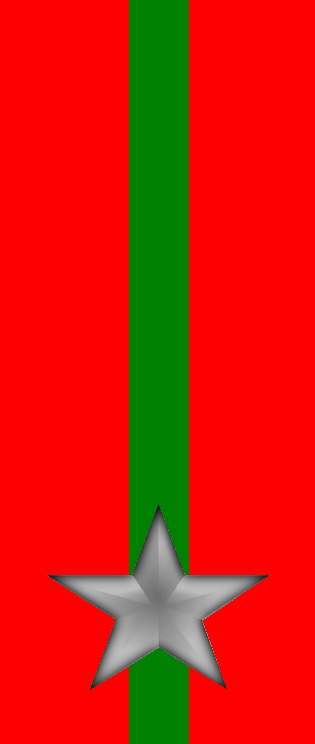
- Regimental gorget patches

The 60th Infantry Regiment "Calabria" (Italian: 60° Reggimento Fanteria "Calabria") is an inactive unit of the Italian Army last based in Trapani. The regiment is named for the region of Calabria and part of the Italian Army's infantry arm. The regiment was one of ten infantry regiments formed by the Royal Italian Army on 16 April 1861. In 1866, the regiment participated in the Third Italian War of Independence and in 1911–12 in the Italo-Turkish War. During World War I, the regiment fought on the Italian front. In 1935–36 the regiment fought in the Second Italo-Ethiopian War. During World War II, the regiment was assigned to the 31st Infantry Division "Calabria", which remained on the island of Sardinia throughout the war.

In 1958, the regiment was disbanded in Sassari in Sardinia and then reformed in Trapani in Sicily as a recruits training unit. In 1974, the regiment was disbanded and in 1975 the regiment's flag and traditions were assigned to the 60th Infantry Battalion "Col di Lana". In 2005 the battalion was disbanded and the flag of the 60th Infantry Regiment "Calabria" transferred to the Shrine of the Flags in the Vittoriano in Rome. The regiment's anniversary falls on 22 November 1917, the day the regiment counterattacked five times to retake the summit of Monte Tomba, for which the regiment was awarded a Silver Medal of Military Valor.

== History ==
=== Formation ===
On 16 April 1861, the Royal Italian Army formed the Brigade "Calabria" in Modena. The brigade consisted of the 59th Infantry Regiment and 60th Infantry Regiment, which were formed on the same day and based in Brescia, respectively in Modena. The 59th Infantry Regiment received three battalions ceded by the 20th Infantry Regiment of the Brigade "Brescia", and by the 21st Infantry Regiment and 22nd Infantry Regiment of the Brigade "Cremona", while the 60th Infantry Regiment received three battalions ceded by the 11th Infantry Regiment and 12th Infantry Regiment of the Brigade "Casale", and by the 17th Infantry Regiment of the Brigade "Acqui".

On 1 August 1862, both regiments of the Brigade "Calabria" ceded one of their depot companies to help form the 67th Infantry Regiment (Brigade "Palermo"), and their 17th Company and 18th Company to help form the 68th Infantry Regiment (Brigade "Palermo"). In 1862–63 the 60th Infantry Regiment operated in the area of Capua to suppress the anti-Sardinian revolt, which had erupted in Southern Italy after the Kingdom of Sardinia had annexed the Kingdom of Two Sicilies. In 1866, the Brigade "Calabria" participated in the Third Italian War of Independence. In October 1866, the 60th Infantry Regiment was sent to Palermo to patrol the city after the suppression of the Seven and a Half Days Revolt. In September 1870, the 60th Infantry Regiment participated in the capture of Rome.

On 25 October 1871, the brigade level was abolished, and the two regiments of the Brigade "Calabria" were renamed 59th Infantry Regiment "Calabria", respectively 60th Infantry Regiment "Calabria". On 2 January 1881, the brigade level was reintroduced, and the two regiments were renamed again as 59th Infantry Regiment (Brigade "Calabria") and 60th Infantry Regiment (Brigade "Calabria"). On 1 November 1884, the 60th Infantry Regiment ceded some of its companies to help form the 82nd Infantry Regiment (Brigade "Torino") in Turin. In 1895–96, the regiment provided seven officers and 229 enlisted for units deployed to Italian Eritrea for the First Italo-Ethiopian War.

=== Italo-Turkish War ===
In 1911, the 60th Infantry Regiment was mobilized for the Italo-Turkish War. In April 1912, the regiment disembarked near Zuwara in Libya and then fought in the battles of Bu Chamez. Between 27 and 28 June 1912, the regiment fought in the Battle of Sidi Said, during which it distinguished itself and was awarded a Bronze Medal of Military Valor, which was also affixed to the regiment's flag.

=== World War I ===
At the outbreak of World War I, the Brigade "Calabria" formed, together with the Brigade "Alpi" and the 33rd Field Artillery Regiment, the 18th Division. At the time the 60th Infantry Regiment consisted of three battalions, each of which fielded four fusilier companies and one machine gun section. After Italy's entry into the war on 23 May 1915, the Brigade "Calabria" was deployed on the Italian front: on 5 July 1915, the brigade began operations to clear Austro-Hungarian Army position in the upper Cordevole Valley. On 8 July 1915, the 59th Infantry Regiment began operations to take the summit of Col di Lana. On 28 July 1915, both regiments resumed the attack to take the summit of the Col di Lana. For the rest of the year the two regiments continued the attacks against the Austro-Hungarian positions on Col di Lana. On 7 November 1915, the 60th Infantry Regiment's III Battalion finally reached the Col di Lana summit, but an Austro-Hungarian counterattack the following night drove the Italians back. On 20 November, two companies of the 52nd Infantry Regiment (Brigade "Alpi") and two companies of the 59th Infantry Regiment tried again to conquer the summit, but failed due to the adverse weather conditions. In 1915, the Brigade "Calabria" suffered 3,092 casualties on the Col di Lana.

During the night of 18 April 1916, the Italians detonated five tonnes of blasting gelatin in a mine driven under the summit of Col di Lana. The explosion destroyed the Austro-Hungarian summit position and the 59th Infantry Regiment's I Battalion stormed the summit, while the III Battalion attacked the ridge between the summits of Col di Lana and Monte Sief. On 20–21 April, the 60th Infantry Regiment continued the attack over the summit ridge towards Monte Sief. On 6 May 1916, the 60th Infantry Regiment's depot in Viterbo provided one newly formed battalion for the 231st Infantry Regiment of the newly formed Brigade "Avellino". On 26 May 1916, the 59th Infantry Regiment's III Battalion attempted again to storm the summit of Monte Sief. On 18 July 1916, the Brigade "Calabria" was transferred to the Travignolo Valley.

The brigade was now tasked with taking the summits of Cima Stradon and Piccolo Colbricon. On 20 July 1916, the brigade began its attack and on 26 July the brigade broke into the Austro-Hungarian defenses on Cima Stradon, but was forced to retreat due to an Austro-Hungarian counterattack. The brigade resumed the attack on 4 August, and then after a pause renewed the attack again on 23, 24, and 25 August. On the latter date, the 59th Infantry Regiment's 6th Company managed to break into the Austro-Hungarian trenches on the Piccolo Colbricon, but was again forced to retreat after the enemy counterattacked. By now the brigade had suffered 2,842 casualties and further attacks were called off.

In January 1917, the 59th Infantry Regiment's depot in Civitavecchia formed the command of the Brigade "Pesaro" and the 239th Infantry Regiment for the new brigade, while the 60th Infantry Regiment's depot in Viterbo formed the 240th Infantry Regiment for the new brigade. On 22 May and on 1 August 1917, the brigade defeated Austro-Hungarian attempts to dislodge the brigade from its positions on the ridges and slopes on Cima Stradon and Piccolo Colbricon. These defensive battles cost the brigades a further 1,648 casualties.

After the disastrous Battle of Caporetto the brigade retreated to the new frontline along the Piave river. On 18 November 1917, the Brigade "Calabria" entered the frontline on the Monte Grappa massif, where the brigade fought in the First Battle of Monte Grappa on Monte Tomba and the neighboring Monfenera. On 22 November 1917, the Austro-Hungarian forces drove the Brigade "Calabria" off the summit of Monte Tomba, but the brigade counterattacked five times and retook the summit. On the same day the 59th Infantry Regiment's II Battalion and III Battalion defeated a series of enemy attacks on Monfenera. On this day alone the brigade suffered more than 650 casualties. On 2 December 1917, the brigade, which had suffered 1,665 casualties in two weeks of combat, was replaced in the first line by French troops.

On 15 June 1918, the brigade fought on the Monte Grappa during the Second Battle of the Piave River. Under heavy Austro-Hungarian attacks the brigade was forced to retreat to their second defensive line, but ultimately the brigade managed to stop the enemy advance at the cost of 2,729 casualties. On 2–3 July 1918, the brigade counterattacked and managed to retake the first defensive line. On 29 October 1918, during the Battle of Vittorio Veneto, the brigade attacked Austro-Hungarian positions on the Col della Berretta, but after suffering more than 830 casualties in a few hours the brigade retreated to its starting positions. On 30 October the brigade was taken out of the line and sent to Bassano del Grappa, where the news of the Armistice of Villa Giusti reached the brigade.

For the conquest of Col di Lana, their conduct and sacrifice on Cima Stradon and Piccolo Colbricon, and their bravery and sacrifice on Monte Tomba and Monfenera, the 59th Infantry Regiment and 60th Infantry Regiment were both awarded a Silver Medal of Military Valor. The medals were affixed to the flags of the two regiments and added to the regiments' coat of arms.

=== Interwar years ===
On 30 November 1926, the Brigade "Calabria" and the 60th Infantry Regiment were disbanded and the two battalions of the 60th Infantry Regiment transferred to the 41st Infantry Regiment "Modena" and 42nd Infantry Regiment "Modena". The next day the 59th Infantry Regiment was renamed 59th Infantry Regiment "Calabria" and assigned to the XXX Infantry Brigade, which was the infantry component of the 30th Territorial Division of Cagliari. The XXX Infantry Brigade also included the 45th Infantry Regiment "Reggio" and 46th Infantry Regiment "Reggio", while 30th Territorial Division of Cagliari also included the 16th Field Artillery Regiment. In 1927, the 59th Infantry Regiment "Calabria" moved from Civitavecchia to La Maddalena in the North of Sardinia.

In 1934, the 30th Territorial Division of Cagliari was renamed Military Command Cagliari – 30th Infantry Division "Sabauda" and in September of the same year the Military Command Sassari – 31st Infantry Division "Caprera" was formed. The Military Command Cagliari was based in Cagliari and responsible for the South of the island of Sardinia, while the Military Command Sassari was based in Sassari and responsible for the island's North. The same month the XXXI Infantry Brigade "Caprera" was formed and assigned to the 31st Infantry Division "Caprera". The XXX Infantry Brigade "Sabauda" then transferred the 45th Infantry Regiment "Reggio" and 59th Infantry Regiment "Calabria" to the newly formed brigade. To bring the XXX Infantry Brigade "Sabauda" back up to strength the 60th Infantry Regiment "Calabria" was reformed in Iglesias with personnel drawn from the 45th, 46th, and 59th infantry regiments.

=== Second Italo-Ethiopian War ===
In 1935–36, the 30th Infantry Division "Sabauda", including the 60th Infantry Regiment "Calabria", participated in the Second Italo-Ethiopian War. On 21 June 1935, the division arrived in Massawa in Eritrea. Initially the "Sabauda" division was tasked with border defence duties in the Asmara-Dek’emhāre area. At the outbreak of the war on 3 October 1935 the division held a defensive line near Barachit and after overcoming initial Ethiopian resistance at Fik’ada it advanced rapidly into Ethiopian territory. In November 1935, the "Sabauda" division took Negash, Agula and Bolbala and then moved to positions on the heights overlooking the Tekezé river during the Ethiopian Christmas Offensive. On 6 January 1936, the division resumed its advance only to stop for all of February 1936 in Enderta Province. On 13–27 February 1936, the "Sabauda" division fought in the Battle of Amba Aradam. On 3 April 1936, the division arrived at Amba Alagi, where it won a decisive encounter and pursued the retreating Ethiopians to Agumserta and finally to Lake Ashenge. With the way to Addis Ababa open, the division surged forward, reaching Shewa Kifle Hāger village on the capital's outskirts on 26 April 1936, and captured Addis Ababa itself on 5 May 1936.

In following months the regiment's battalions battled Ethiopian forces and rebels, which operated near Addis Ababa. On 24 July 1936, the regiment's III Battalion encountered a large rebel force and dispersed it with a bayonet charge. For this action, the battalion was awarded a Bronze Medal of Military Valor, which was affixed to the flag of the 60th Infantry Regiment "Calabria" and added to the regiment's coat of arms. The "Sabauda" division remained in the Ethiopian capital until December 1936, when it began its return to Sardinia. The 60th Infantry Regiment "Calabria" arrived back at its base in Iglesias on 8 February 1937. For its service in Ethiopia between 3 October 1935 and 5 May 1936 the 60th Infantry Regiment "Calabria" was awarded, like all infantry units, which had participated in the war, a Military Order of Italy, which was affixed to the regiment's flag.

On 15 April 1939, the 45th Infantry Regiment "Reggio" in Sassari and the 60th Infantry Regiment "Calabria" in Iglesias switched flags and names. On 15 October 1939, the 31st Infantry Division "Caprera" was renamed 31st Infantry Division "Calabria", while the XXXI Infantry Brigade "Caprera" was disbanded and the 59th Infantry Regiment "Calabria" and 60th Infantry Regiment "Calabria" came under direct command of the division. The division, which also included the 40th Artillery Regiment "Calabria", was tasked with the defense of the Northern half of Sardinia.

=== World War II ===
At the outbreak of World War II, the 60th Infantry Regiment "Calabria" consisted of a command, a command company, three fusilier battalions, a support weapons battery equipped with 65/17 infantry support guns, and a mortar company equipped with 81mm Mod. 35 mortars. The "Calabria" division and its regiments remained in Sardinia on coastal defense duty until the Armistice of Cassibile was announced on 8 September 1943. The next day, the "Calabria" division positioned itself to defend Sassari from an expected attack by the German 90th Panzergrenadier Division. However the Wehrmacht decided to evacuate its forces to Corsica. On 12–14 September 1943, the 59th Infantry Regiment "Calabria" skirmished with German forces at Bassacutena and Campovaglio, while the 60th Infantry Regiment "Calabria" engaged German forces at Littichedda, and Santa Teresa Gallura, in an attempt to speed up their withdrawal from the island.

The "Calabria" division then joined the Italian Co-belligerent Army. On 25 September 1944, the division was reorganized as Internal Security Division "Calabria". On the same date the 60th Infantry Regiment "Calabria" was renamed 60th Internal Security Regiment "Calabria". For the rest of the war the regiment was tasked with the defence of Mediterranean Allied Air Forces airfields on Sardinia; as well as public security and demining.

=== Cold War ===
On 15 August 1946, the Internal Security Division "Calabria" was disbanded and its command used to form the Infantry Brigade "Calabria". On the same date the 59th and 60th internal security regiments were renamed 59th Infantry Regiment "Calabria" respectively 60th Infantry Regiment "Calabria". In early 1947, the 59th Infantry Regiment "Calabria" left the brigade and moved from Cagliari to Perugia and then in October of the same year to Palmanova, where the regiment joined the Infantry Division "Mantova". On 1 February 1948, the Infantry Brigade "Calabria" was disbanded and the 60th Infantry Regiment "Calabria" was assigned to the Sardinia Military Command.

On 28 February 1958, the 60th Infantry Regiment "Calabria" was disbanded in Sassari in Sardinia and the regiment's flag transferred to Trapani in Sicily, where on 1 July of the same year the regiment was reformed as 60th Infantry Regiment "Calabria" by renaming the existing 4th Recruits Training Center. The regiment was assigned to the Sicily Military Command and trained the recruits drafted in Sicily and the Province of Reggio Calabria on the Italian mainland. On 31 December 1974, the regiment was disbanded and the next day the regiment's I Battalion was renamed Recruits Training Battalion "Calabria". The battalion received the regiment's flag for safekeeping.

During the 1975 army reform the army disbanded the regimental level and newly independent battalions were granted for the first time their own flags. On 15 November 1975, the Recruits Training Battalion "Calabria" became an autonomous unit and was renamed 60th Infantry Battalion "Col di Lana". The battalion was assigned to the Sicily Military Region and tasked with training the recruits destined for units of the military region. On 12 November 1976, the President of the Italian Republic Giovanni Leone assigned with decree 846 the flag and traditions of the 60th Infantry Regiment "Calabria" to the 60th Infantry Battalion "Col di Lana". On 14 February 1978, the 46th Infantry Battalion "Reggio", which had trained the recruits assigned the Motorized Brigade "Aosta", was disbanded and the 60th Infantry Battalion "Col di Lana" from then onward also trained the recruits destined for the Motorized Brigade "Aosta".

=== Recent times ===
On 31 July 1991, the 60th Infantry Battalion "Col di Lana" lost its autonomy and the next day entered the newly formed 60th Infantry Regiment "Col di Lana". On 3 September 1992, the regiment was disbanded and the battalion became once more an autonomous unit as 60th Battalion "Col di Lana". The battalion continued to train recruits drafted in Sicily until the regiment was disbanded on 31 May 2005 and the flag of the 60th Infantry Regiment "Calabria" transferred to the Shrine of the Flags in the Vittoriano in Rome.
