= 136th Armored Division "Giovani Fascisti" =

- Active: 24 May 1942–May 1943
- Country: Kingdom of Italy
- Branch: Royal Italian Army
- Type: Infantry
- Size: Division
- Engagements: World War II; North African Campaign

Commanders
- Notable commanders: Nino Sozzani

Insignia
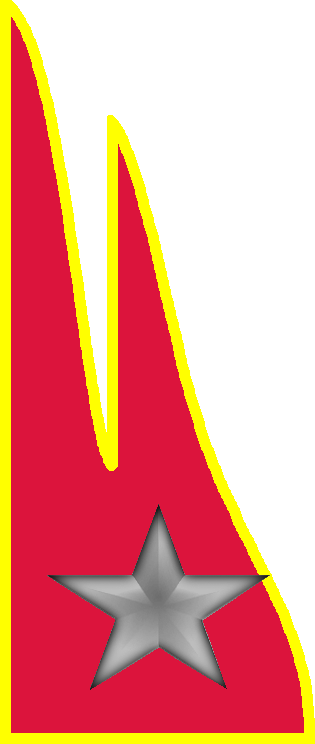
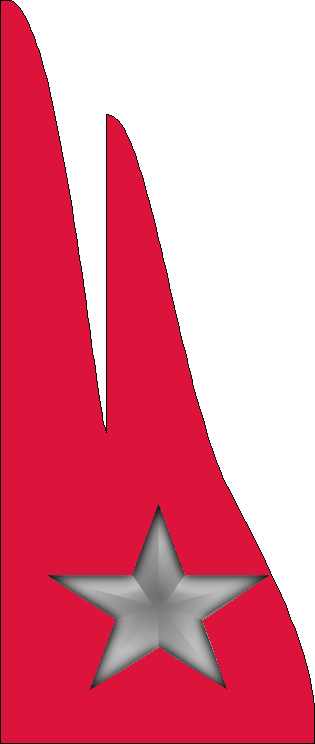
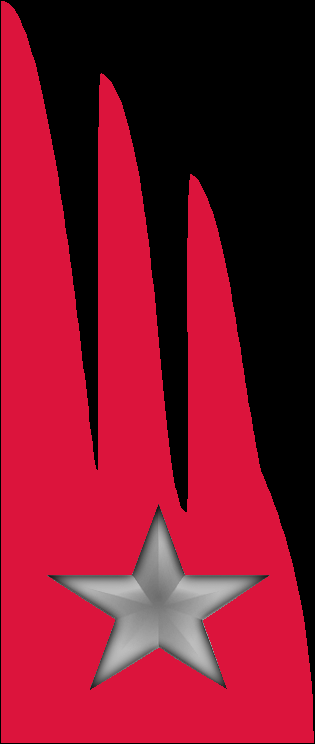
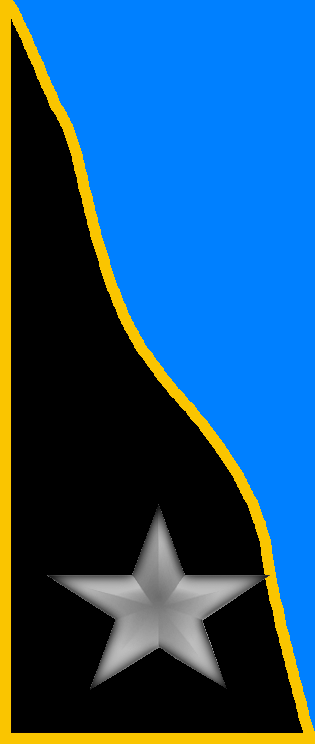
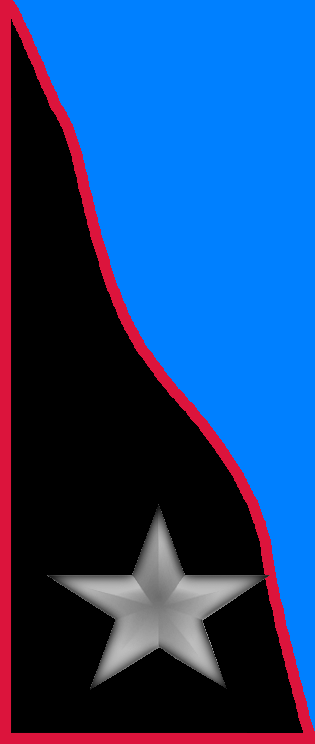
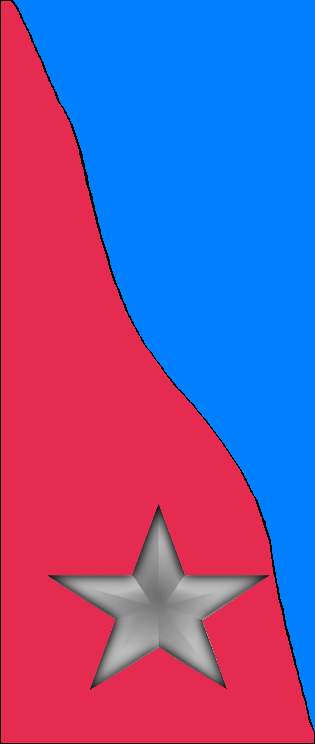
- Identification symbol: Giovani Fascisti gorget patches

The 136th Armored Division "Giovani Fascisti" (Italian: 136ª Divisione corazzata "Giovani Fascisti"), also known in English as the Young Fascists Division or merely the Young Fascists, was an infantry division of the Royal Italian Army during World War II.

== History ==
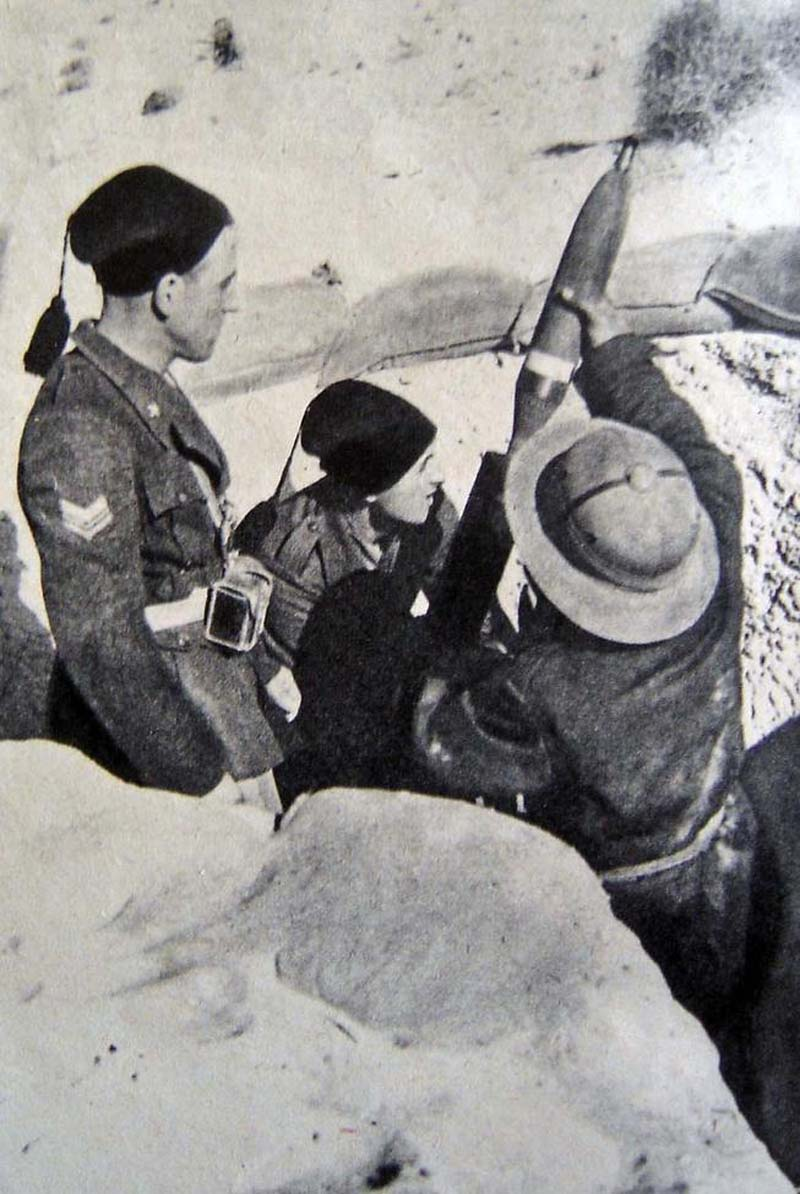
Members of the Giovani Fascisti Division use a Modello 35 infantry mortar in North Africa.

The division was never fully formed and staffed, and it never had armored vehicles: the 1st Tank Infantry Regiment, which was briefly assigned to it never reached the division in Libya.

=== Origins ===
In 1940, with Italy's entry into the war, the fascist youth organization Gioventù Italiana del Littorio (GIL) organized the "March of the Youth": about 20,000 young fascists and members of the fascist University groups, provisionally organized into 25 battalions, marched to Padua, where Benito Mussolini reviewed them on 10 October 1940. The decision to dissolve these battalions was followed by such protests and riots that the National Fascist Party sent Major Fulvio Balisti, former Commander of the GIL battalions of Bologna to put down the revolt. On suggestion of National Fascist Party General Secretary Ettore Muti the GIL Command formed three special battalions, which were sent to train in Formia, Gaeta and Scauri. After an inspection General Taddeo Orlando expressed a positive opinion on their employment and Adelchi Serena, who succeeded Ettore Muti in the position of party secretary gave his consent to create with the three battalions the 301st CC.NN. Legion.

=== Battalion Group "Giovani Fascisti" ===
The 301st Legion CC.NN. "Primavera" was officially established on 12 April 1941. Already on 18 April it was decided to enroll the young fascists as volunteers in the Royal Italian Army to form the Battalion Group "Giovani Fascisti". The army performed a thorough selection, which reduced the number of those able to enlist to about two thousand of the class of 1922. However the age and parental consent were not controlled properly and besides the class of 1922, also youths from 1923 and 1924, as well as three volunteers from 1925 and one from 1926 were enrolled in the three battalions of the Battalion Group "Giovani Fascisti". The Fascist militia withdrew its uniforms and the volunteers received the army's gray-green uniform and the two-pointed crimson gorget patches of the Bersaglieri corps with an added yellow border. As headgear the battalion group received a black fez, but no helmets. The volunteers fought the entire war without being issued helmets. On 21 April 1942 the battalion group took the oath to King.

=== Western Desert Campaign ===
On 29 July 1941, the Battalion Group "Giovani Fascisti" with two battalions arrived in Tripoli in Libya for the Western Desert campaign. The III Battalion had remained in Italy as the group's depot and training unit. In Libya the group was sent to Al-Khums and Misrata, where the group formed an anti-tank company with 47/32 anti-tank guns and a mortar company with 81mm Mod. 35 mortars. In September, the group was assigned to the Reconnaissance Grouping of the Maneuver Army Corps. During Operation Crusader, on 4–6 December, "Giovani Fascisti" fought the Action at Bir el Gubi, with German tank support, against the 11th Indian Infantry Brigade. However, on 6 December, with the British gaining the upper hand in Operation Crusader, Rommel ordered a general retreat for Axis forces, which the Battalion Group joined. It was then attached to the 60th Infantry Division "Sabratha", then taken out of the line in March 1942.

=== Formation of the division ===
On 24 May 1942, in recognition of the value shown at Bir el Gobi, the 136th Armored Division "Giovani Fascisti" was established in Verona. Despite its name, the division was never equipped with armored vehicles and the only units assigned were in addition to the two "Giovani Fascisti" battalions, the 136th Artillery Regiment and the III Armored Group "Cavalleggeri di Monferrato" with a handful of AB41 armored cars. After the divisional command had been flown to Libya the division occupied the Siwa Oasis in Egypt on July 22, 1942. After the group's III Battalion had arrived in Siwa the group was elevated to Regiment "Giovani Fascisti" on 30 August 1942.

On 22 September the division was inspected by Generalfeldmarschall Erwin Rommel. Clashes with allied patrols caused minor losses, but the most insidious danger was malaria, which affected almost the entire garrison with about 800 hospitalizations. At the beginning of the Second Battle of El Alamein there was growing discontent in the division for the lack of combat, inducing 825 volunteers to request a transfer to operational units.

==== Organization October 1942 ====
The division's organization at Siwa was:

- 136th Armored Division "Giovani Fascisti"
  - Headquarters
    - Command Company
  - Regiment "Giovani Fascisti"
    - Command Company
    - 3 × Volunteer battalions
    - Anti-tank Company (47/32 mod. 35 anti-tank guns)
    - Mortar Company (81mm mod. 35 mortars)
  - 136th Armored Artillery Regiment "Giovani Fascisti"
    - Command Unit
    - XIV Group (65/17 mod. 13 mountain guns mounted on Morris CS8 trucks)
    - XV Group (65/17 mod. 13 mountain guns mounted on Morris CS8 trucks)
    - XVI Group (75/27 mod. 06 field guns mounted on TL.37 trucks)
    - XVII Group (100/17 mod. 14 howitzers mounted on Lancia 3Ro trucks)
    - DVI Anti-aircraft Group (90/53 anti-aircraft guns)
    - 13th Anti-aircraft Battery (20/65 mod. 35 anti-aircraft guns)
    - Ammunition and Supply Unit
  - III Armored Group, "Cavalleggeri di Monferrato" (AB41 armored cars)
  - IX Infantry Battalion

The defeat at El Alamein forced the 136th Armored Division to abandon Siwa on 6 November 1942. The division's units reached Ajdabiya on 16–18 November 1942. The division was deployed at Marsa al-Brega and fought in the Battle of El Agheila, and then fell back to Nofaliya. In December 1942 the division received the 8th Bersaglieri Regiment from the disbanded 132nd Armored Division "Ariete". The continuing retreat took the division to Buerat and Tarhuna, finally to the Mareth Line in Tunisia.

=== Tunisian Campaign ===
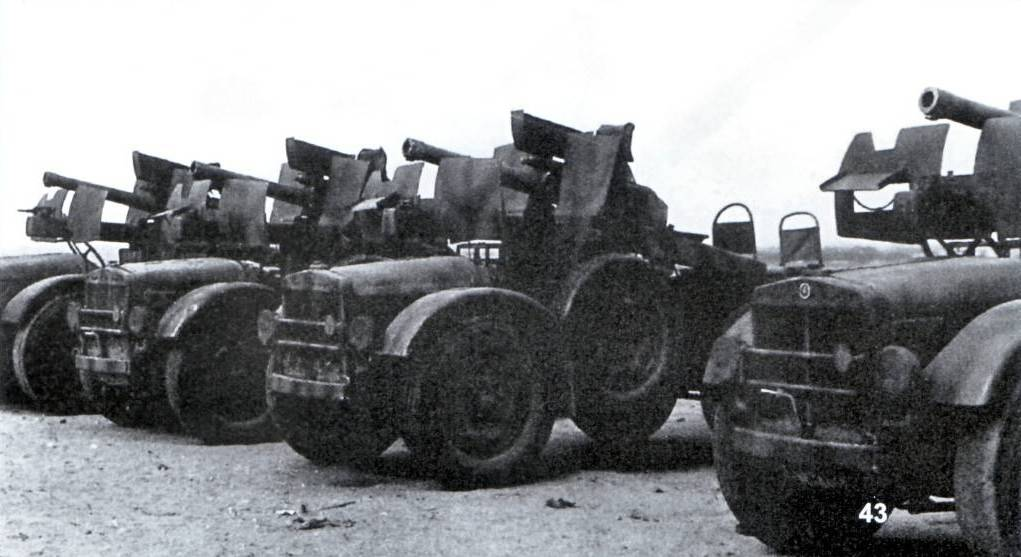
75/27 field guns mounted on TL.37 in North Africa

The division participated in the Tunisian Campaign from beginning to end. The division had arrived at the Mareth Line on 25 January 1943 and with all other Italian and German units on the Mareth Line entered the Italian 1st Army on 23 February. On 6 March 1943 the Giovani Fascisti participated in the Battle of Medenine, and ten days later in the Battle of the Mareth Line. On 25 March the division retreated together with the other Axis forces to the prepared defensive position at Wadi Akarit. On 6–7 April 1943 the British Eighth Army broke through the Axis line in the Battle of Wadi Akarit and the Italian 1st Army was forced to withdraw Enfidaville.

While the British Eighth Army and Italian 1st Army at Enfidaville remained static, to their North Allied forces overran German and Italian defenses and took Bizerte and Tunis. By 12 May 1943 the remaining 80,000 men of the Italian 1st Army were surrounded and the next day its commanding officer General Giovanni Messe surrendered his army to New Zealand General Bernard Freyberg. The Giovani Fascisti was officially declared lost on the 13 May 1943.

==== Organization March 1943 ====
The division's organization on the Mareth Line was:

- 136th Armored Division "Giovani Fascisti"
  - Headquarters
    - Command Company
  - Regiment "Giovani Fascisti"
    - Command Company
    - 4 × Volunteer battalions
    - Anti-tank Company (47/32 mod. 35 anti-tank guns)
    - Mortar Company (81mm mod. 35 mortars)
  - 8th Bersaglieri Regiment
    - Command Company
    - X Battalion (from the 7th Bersaglieri Regiment)
    - XI Battalion (from the 7th Bersaglieri Regiment)
    - LVII Battalion (from the 10th Bersaglieri Regiment)
  - 136th Armored Artillery Regiment "Giovani Fascisti"
    - Command Unit
    - XIV Group (65/17 mod. 13 mountain guns mounted on Morris CS8 trucks)
    - XV Group (65/17 mod. 13 mountain guns mounted on Morris CS8 trucks)
    - XVI Group (75/27 mod. 06 field guns mounted on TL.37 trucks)
    - XVII Group (100/17 mod. 14 howitzers mounted on Lancia 3Ro trucks)
    - DVI Anti-aircraft Group (90/53 anti-aircraft guns)
    - 13th Anti-aircraft Battery (20/65 mod. 35 anti-aircraft guns)
    - Ammunition and Supply Unit
  - XLVIII Anti-aircraft Artillery Group
  - IX Infantry Battalion
  - XXV Mixed Engineer Battalion (from the destroyed 25th Infantry Division "Bologna")

== Planned organization ==
The division planned, but never attained, organization was:

- 136th Armored Division "Giovani Fascisti"
  - Headquarters
    - Command Company
    - 105th Carabinieri Section
    - 136th Field Post Office
  - 1st Tank Infantry Regiment
    - 1 × Tank Battalion M
    - III Tank Group, Regiment "Lancieri di Novara" (L6/40 light tanks)
  - Regiment "Giovani Fascisti"
    - Command Company
    - 3 × Volunteer battalions
    - X CC.NN. Battalion "M"
  - 136th Armored Artillery Regiment "Giovani Fascisti"
    - XVI Motorized Artillery Group (75/27 mod. 06 field guns mounted on TL.37)
    - XVII Motorized Artillery Group (100/17 mod. 14 howitzers mounted on Lancia 3Ro trucks)
    - DVI Anti-aircraft Group (90/53 anti-aircraft guns)
  - III Squadrons Group/ "Cavalleggeri di Monferrato" (AB41 armored cars)
  - CXXXVI Self-propelled Anti-tank Battalion
  - CXXXVI Mixed Engineer Battalion
    - 1 × Engineer company
    - 1 × Telegraph and radio operators company
  - 53rd Medical Section
    - 2 × Field hospitals
    - 1 × Surgical unit
  - 136th Supply Section
  - 136th Transport Section

== Commanding officers ==
The division's commanding officers were:

- Generale di Brigata Ismaele Di Nisio (24 May 1942 - 22 November 1942)
- Generale di Divisione Nino Sozzani (23 November 1942 - 2 April 1943)
- Generale di Divisione Guido Boselli (3 April 1943 - 13 May 1943, POW)

== See also ==
- North African Campaign
- Tunisia Campaign

== Bibliography ==
- Paoletti, Ciro (2008). A Military History of Italy. Greenwood Publishing Group. ISBN 0-275-98505-9.
- Giulio Bedeschi, Fronte d'Africa. Ed. Mursia. Milano, 1979.
- John Gooch. Decisive campaigns of the Second World War. Publisher Psychology Press, 1990 ISBN 0-7146-3369-0
