= 30th Infantry Division "Sabauda" =

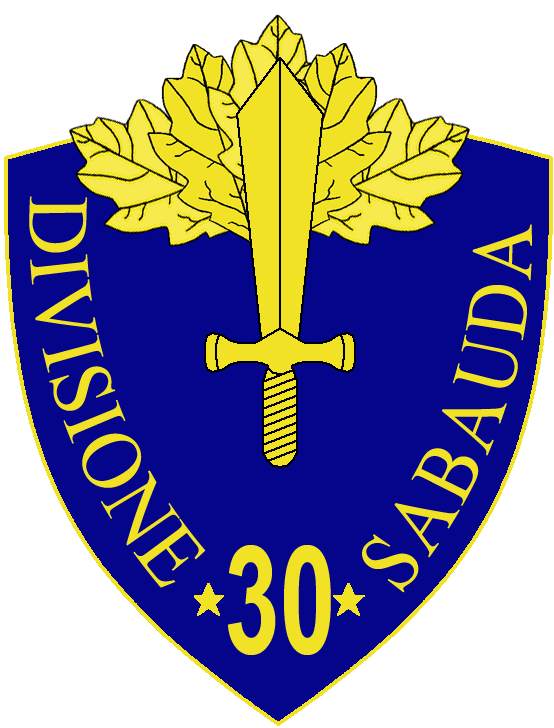
- 30th Infantry Division "Sabauda" insignia
- Active: 1935 – 9 February 1937; 15 April 1939 – 1 October 1944
- Country: Kingdom of Italy
- Branch: Royal Italian Army (1935-1937, 1939-1943); Italian Co-belligerent Army (1943-1944)
- Type: Infantry
- Size: Division
- Garrison/HQ: Cagliari
- Engagements: Second Italo-Ethiopian War: Christmas Offensive; Battle of Amba Aradam; Battle of Maychew; March of the Iron Will; World War II: Italian campaign

Commanders
- Notable commanders: Nino Sozzani

Insignia
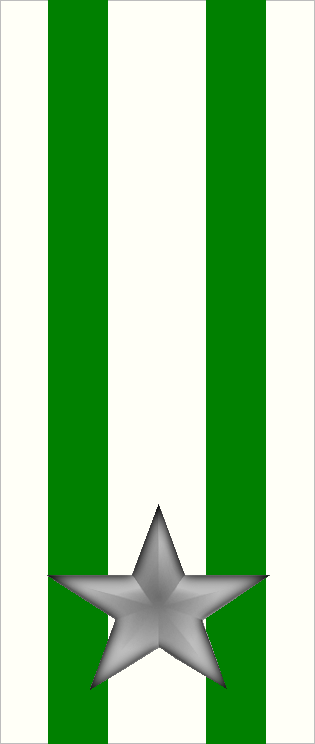
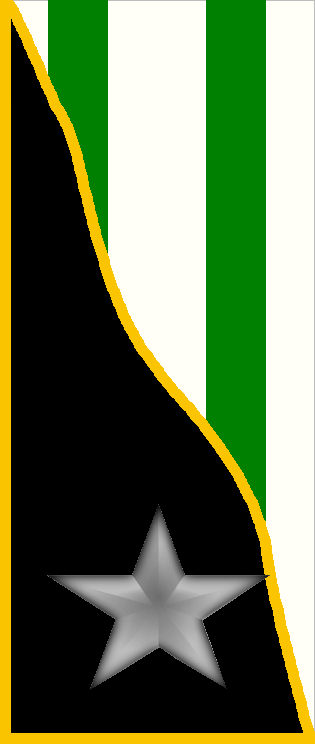
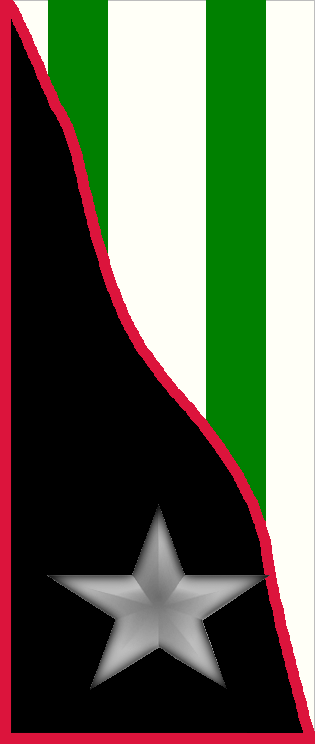
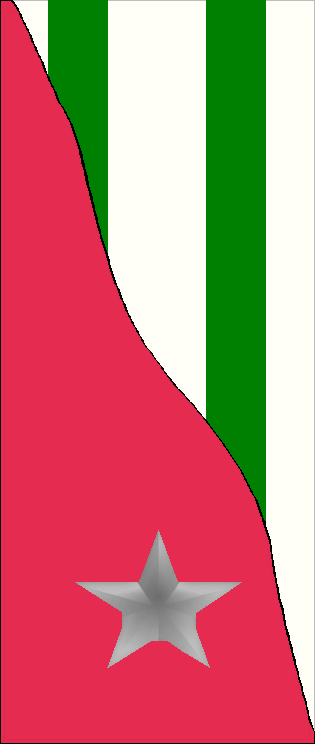
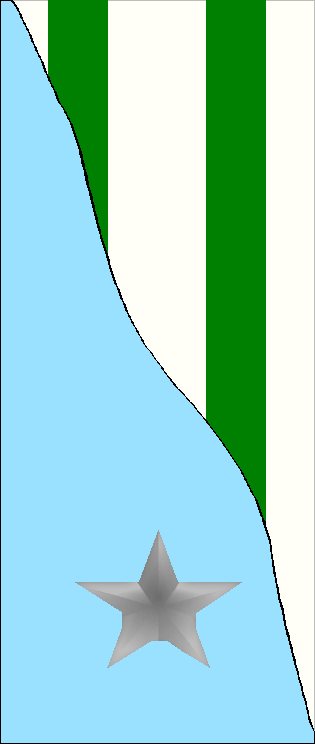
- Identification symbol: Sabauda Division gorget patches

The 30th Infantry Division "Sabauda" (Italian: 30ª Divisione di fanteria "Sabauda") was an infantry division of the Royal Italian Army during World War II. The Sabauda was based in Cagliari in Sardinia and named for the Latin name of the Royal House of Savoy. After the announcement of the Armistice of Cassibile on 8 September 1943 the division joined the Italian Co-belligerent Army.

== History ==
The division's lineage begins with the Brigade "Reggio" established on 8 August 1859 with the 3rd and 4th infantry regiments of the Army of the United Provinces of Central Italy. On 25 March 1860 the Brigade "Reggio" entered the Royal Sardinian Army three days after the Kingdom of Sardinia had annexed the United Provinces of Central Italy. Already before entering the Royal Sardinian Army the brigade's two infantry regiments had been renumbered on 30 December 1859 as 45th Infantry Regiment and 46th Infantry Regiment.

=== World War I ===
The brigade fought on the Italian front in World War I. On 31 October 1926 the brigade assumed the name of XXX Infantry Brigade and received the 59th Infantry Regiment "Calabria" from the disbanded Brigade "Calabria". The brigade was the infantry component of the 30th Territorial Division of Cagliari, which also included the 16th Artillery Regiment. In 1934 the division changed its name to Military Command Cagliari - 30th Infantry Division "Sabauda" and in September of the same year the division ceded the 45th Infantry Regiment "Reggio" and 59th Infantry Regiment "Calabria" to the newly activated XXXI Infantry Brigade, which was part of the newly formed Military Command Sassari - 31st Infantry Division "Caprera".

On 1 May 1935 the Military Command Cagliari raised the 60th Infantry Regiment "Calabria" in Iglesias, which in June of the same year entered the XXX Infantry Brigade.

=== Second Italo-Ethiopian War ===
In 1935 the Sabauda was mobilized for the Second Italo-Ethiopian War. The division arrived in Massawa in Eritrea on 21 June 1935 and consisted of the 46th and 60th infantry regiments, and the 16th Artillery Regiment. The 3rd Bersaglieri Regiment was attached to the division for the duration of the campaign. Initially the Sabauda division was tasked with the border defence duties in Asmara-Dek’emhāre area. At the outbreak of the war on 3 October 1935 the division held a defensive line near Barachit and after overcoming initial Ethiopian resistance at Fik’ada (Focada) it advanced rapidly into Ethiopian territory. In November 1935 the Sabauda took Negash, Agula and Bolbala and then moved to positions on the heights overlooking the Tekezé during the Ethiopian Christmas Offensive. The division resumed its advance on 6 January 1936 only to stop for all of February 1936 in Enderta Province. The Sabauda had a minor role in the Battle of Amba Aradam on 13–27 February 1936. On 3 April 1936 the division arrived at Amba Alagi, where it won a decisive encounter and pursued the retreating Ethiopians to Agumserta and finally to Lake Ashenge. With the way to Addis Ababa open, the division surged forward, reaching Shewa Kifle Hāger village on the capital's outskirts on 26 April 1936, and captured Addis Ababa itself on 5 May 1936. The division remained in the capital until December 1936, when it returned to Sardinia.

From 1 July 1935 to 9 February 1937, while the Sabauda division was in Africa, the division's depots continued to train conscrips, who were used to temporarily reform the 239th Infantry Regiment "Pesaro", 240th Infantry Regiment "Pesaro", and 42nd Artillery Regiment, which were assigned to the temporarily formed 130th Infantry Division "Sabauda II". Likewise, the depot of the 3rd Bersaglieri Regiment in Livorno continued to train conscripts, who were assigned to the temporarily reformed 18th Bersaglieri Regiment, which was then assigned to the 130th Infantry Division "Sabauda II". The After the 30th Infantry Division "Sabauda" returned from Ethiopia the 130th Infantry Division "Sabauda II" and its regiments were disbanded and their personnel transferred to the regiments returning from their war.

=== World War II ===
On 15 April 1939 the 45th Infantry Regiment "Reggio" in Sassari and the 60th Infantry Regiment "Calabria" in Iglesias switched names and on the same day the XXX Infantry Brigade was disbanded, with the two infantry regiments coming under direct command of the division. On the same date the 16th Artillery Regiment received the name "Sabauda". The division was tasked with the defence of southern Sardinia, as part of the XIII Army Corps.

In June 1940 the division's sector was reduced to the area of Sulcis, where an allied landing was deemed most likely. In December 1941 the 205th Coastal Division was activated in Carbonia, which took up the coastal defense duty, with the Sabauda tasked as mobile reserve behind the 205th Coastal Division. The Sabauda remained at its positions until the Armistice of Cassibile was announced on 8 September 1943. On 10 September 1943 the division repositioned itself northwards along the Villacidro-Samassi-Selegas-Suelli line to deflect an expected attack by the German 90th Panzergrenadier Division. However the Wehrmacht decided to evacuate its forces to Corsica and the Italian units on Sardinia allowed them to withdraw unhindered.

After Sardinia was secured the Sabauda moved to Sicily on 10 November 1943, where it initially took up positions in the Enna-Caltanissetta region, until it relocated to the Messina-Catania-Syracuse area in September 1944. On 1 October 1944 the division was reformed as Internal Security Division "Sabauda" and for the rest of the war engaged primarily in airfield defence, policing and demining work.

=== Infantry Brigade "Reggio" ===
On 15 August 1946 the Internal Security Division "Sabauda" was downsized to brigade and, due to the result of the 1946 Italian institutional referendum, which had resulted in the deposition of the Royal House of Savoy, the brigade was named Infantry Brigade "Reggio". The Reggio was dissolved with most of its units on 1 Februar 1948, while the 45th Infantry Regiment "Reggio" joined the Infantry Division "Aosta".

== Organization ==
=== Second Italo-Ethiopian War 1935 ===
- 30th Division "Sabauda" - General Italo Gariboldi
  - 3rd Bersaglieri Regiment
    - XVIII, XX, and XXV Bersaglieri battalions
    - LXXXIII Replacements battalion
  - 46th Infantry Regiment "Reggio"
  - 60th Infantry Regiment "Calabria"
  - 16th Artillery Regiment
  - DXXX Machine Gun Battalion
  - XXX Replacements Battalion
  - 30th Engineer Company

Notes:

- Each Army Division in the Ethiopian Campaign had a Pack-Mules unit of 3000 mules and three Regimental Trucks units (20 light trucks each).
- The 3rd Bersaglieri Regiment was detached during the campaign to form the core of the Oriental-Africa Fast Column.

=== World War II ===
30th Infantry Division "Sabauda" organization in 1940

- 30th Infantry Division "Sabauda", in Cagliari
  - Headquarters
    - Command Company
    - 96th Carabinieri Section
    - 97th Carabinieri Section
    - 30th Field Post Office
    - 30th Infantry Division Command Transport Squad
  - 45th Infantry Regiment "Sabauda", (Note: Named 45th Infantry Regiment "Reggio" until 1939 when the army reorganized its divisions as binary divisions and divisional infantry regiments took the name of the division.) in Iglesias
    - Command Company
    - 3 × Fusilier battalions
    - Support Weapons Battery (65/17 mod. 13 infantry support guns)
    - Mortar Company (81mm mod. 35 mortars)
  - 46th Infantry Regiment "Sabauda", (Note: Named 46th Infantry Regiment "Reggio" until 1939 when the army reorganized its divisions as binary divisions and divisional infantry regiments took the name of the division.) in Cagliari
    - Command Company
    - 3 × Fusilier battalions
    - Support Weapons Battery (65/17 mod. 13 infantry support guns)
    - Mortar Company (81mm mod. 35 mortars)
  - 16th Artillery Regiment "Sabauda", in Cagliari
    - Command Unit
    - I Group (100/17 mod. 14 howitzers)
    - II Group (75/27 mod. 11 field guns)
    - III Group (75/13 mod. 15 mountain guns; renumbered CXVI on 20 May 1943 and transferred to the 13th Artillery Grouping of the XIII Army Corps)
    - XIII Group (100/17 mod. 14 howitzers; transferred on 10 September 1942 from the 13th Artillery Grouping)
    - LXXVII Anti-aircraft Artillery Group (75/46 mod. 34 anti-aircraft guns; assigned to the regiment from March to September 1943)
    - CXXIII Group (149/13 mod. 14 (A) howitzers; transferred on 10 March 1943 from the 13th Artillery Grouping; left the regiment in June 1943)
    - 330th Anti-aircraft Battery (20/65 mod. 35 anti-aircraft guns)
    - Ammunition and Supply Unit
  - XXX Mortar Battalion (81mm mod. 35 mortars)
  - XXX Self-propelled Anti-tank Battalion (Semovente da 75/34 self-propelled guns; formed in 1943)
  - CXXX Mixed Engineer Battalion (formed in 1943)
  - 30th Anti-tank Company (47/32 mod. 35 anti-tank guns)
  - 130th Anti-tank Company (47/32 mod. 35 anti-tank guns; formed in 1943)
  - 10th Engineer Company (entered the CXXX Mixed Engineer Battalion in 1943)
  - 30th Telegraph and Radio Operators Company (entered the CXXX Mixed Engineer Battalion in 1943)
  - 43rd Medical Section
    - 516th Field Hospital
    - 517th Field Hospital
    - 518th Field Hospital
    - 1 × Surgical unit
  - 30th Transport Section
  - 42nd Supply Section
  - 1 × Autocarrette Section

Attached to the division from early 1943:

- 176th CC.NN. Legion "Cacciatori Guide di Sardegna"
  - CLXXV CC.NN. Battalion
  - CLXXVI CC.NN. Battalion
  - 176th CC.NN. Machine Gun Company

== Commanding officers ==
The division's commanding officers were:

- Generale di Divisione Ubaldo Scanagatta (1 September 1939 - 21 July 1940)
- Colonel Gino Piccini (acting, 22 July - 19 August 1940)
- Generale di Brigata Nino Sozzani (20 August 1940 - 14 February 1942)
- Generale di Giovanni Battista Zenati (15 February 1942 - 1 October 1944)
