= Ubaldo Scanagatta =

Italian general

- Born: 9 March 1883; Savigliano, Kingdom of Italy
- Died: 21 July 1940 (aged 57); Oristano, Kingdom of Italy
- Military career
- Allegiance: Kingdom of Italy
- Branch: Royal Italian Army
- Service years: 1905–1940
- Rank: Brigadier General
- Commands: 19th Artillery Regiment "Venezia"; 30th Infantry Division "Sabauda"
- Conflicts: Italo-Turkish War; World War I; Battle of Asiago; Second Italo-Ethiopian War; Battle of Shire; World War II
- Awards: Silver Medal of Military Valor; Bronze Medal of Military Valor (twice); Order of the Crown of Italy

Ubaldo Scanagatta (9 March 1883 – 21 July 1940) was an Italian general during World War II.

== Biography ==
Hailing from a noble Piedmontese family, he was born in Savigliano on March 9, 1883, the son of Giancarlo Scanagatta. On 7 September 1903 he entered the Royal Military Academy of Artillery and Engineers in Turin, graduating in 1905 with the rank of artillery second lieutenant. With the rank of captain, he participated in the Italo-Turkish War, earning a Bronze Medal of Military Valor, and then in the First World War rising to the rank of Lieutenant Colonel and earning a Silver Medal of Military Valor for his role during the battle of Asiago. After serving as a staff officer, he was promoted to colonel on March 28, 1933, taking command of the 19th Artillery Regiment "Venezia", part of the 19th Infantry Division "Gavinana". He then participated in the conquest of Ethiopia, during which he was awarded another bronze medal for military valor for his role in the battle of Shire.

On 14 September 1937, Scanagatta was promoted to brigadier general and appointed commander of the garrison of Zara until 1 September 1938, when he became deputy commander of the 30th Infantry Division "Sabauda", stationed in Sardinia, with headquarters in Cagliari. On 15 April 1939 he became commander of the Division, a post he still held when the Kingdom of Italy entered the Second World War on 10 June 1940. In the afternoon of 21 July 1940, while returning to Cagliari after inspecting the anti-aircraft defenses of the great dam of Santa Chiara del Tirso, Scanagatta was killed in a car crash about fifteen kilometers from Oristano. He was the first general of the Royal Italian Army to die in the Second World War.
