= Samassi =

- Comune
- Comune di Samassi
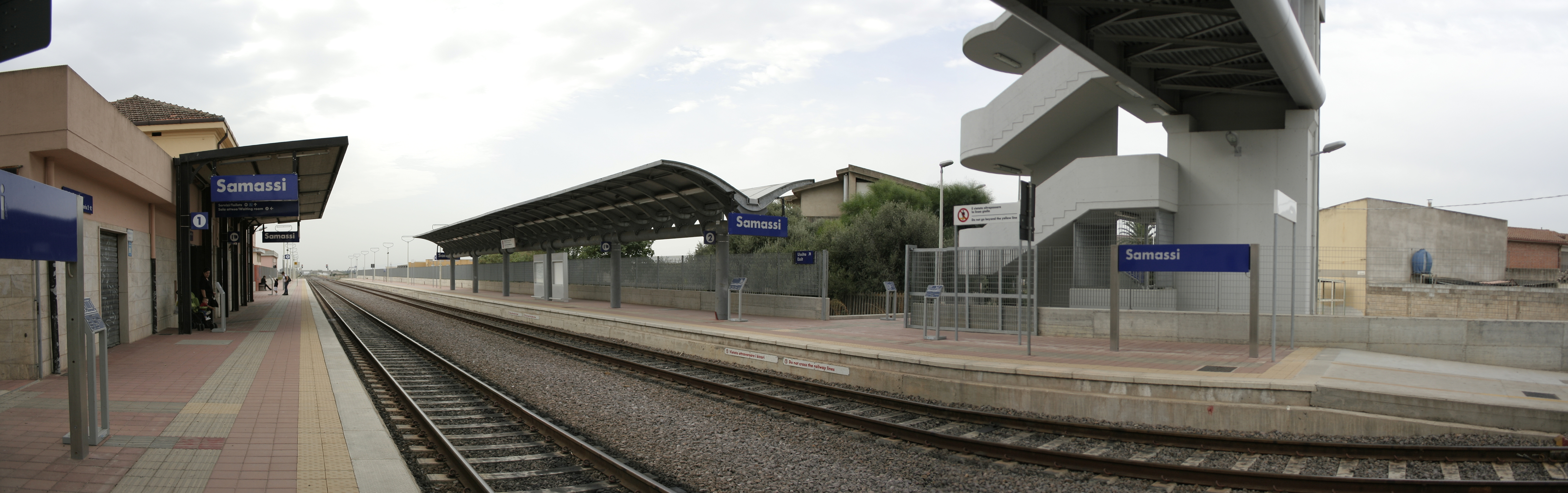
- Railway station in Samassi

- Location within Sardinia
- Coordinates: 39°29′N 8°54′E
- Country: Italy
- Region: Sardinia
- Province: Medio Campidano

Area
  - Total: 42.04 km^{2} (16.23 sq mi)

Population (2026)
  - Total: 4,674
  - Density: 111.2/km^{2} (288.0/sq mi)
- Demonym: Samassesi
- Time zone: UTC+1 (CET)
  - Summer (DST): UTC+2 (CEST)
- Postal code: 09030
- Dialing code: 070
- Website: Official website

Samassi is a town and comune (municipality) in the Province of Medio Campidano in the autonomous island region of Sardinia in Italy, located about 35 kilometres (22 mi) northwest of Cagliari and about 9 kilometres (6 mi) south of Sanluri. It has 4,674 inhabitants.

Samassi borders the municipalities of Furtei, Sanluri, Serramanna, and Serrenti.

== Demographics ==
As of 2026, the population is 4,674, of which 49.3% are male, and 50.7% are female. Minors make up 10.9% of the population, and seniors make up 31.0%.

Historical population

Year	Pop.	±%
1861	2,509	—
1871	2,316	−7.7%
1881	2,477	+7.0%
1901	2,379	−4.0%
1911	2,827	+18.8%
1921	3,003	+6.2%
1931	3,446	+14.8%
1936	3,525	+2.3%

Year	Pop.	±%
1951	4,337	+23.0%
1961	4,534	+4.5%
1971	4,742	+4.6%
1981	5,312	+12.0%
1991	5,463	+2.8%
2001	5,274	−3.5%
2011	5,321	+0.9%
2021	4,836	−9.1%

Source: ISTAT

=== Immigration ===
As of 2025, immigrants make up 5.2% of the population. The 5 largest foreign countries of birth are India, Switzerland, Senegal, Germany, and Romania.
