= 81/14 Model 35 Mortar =

Mortaio da 81 Mod. 35
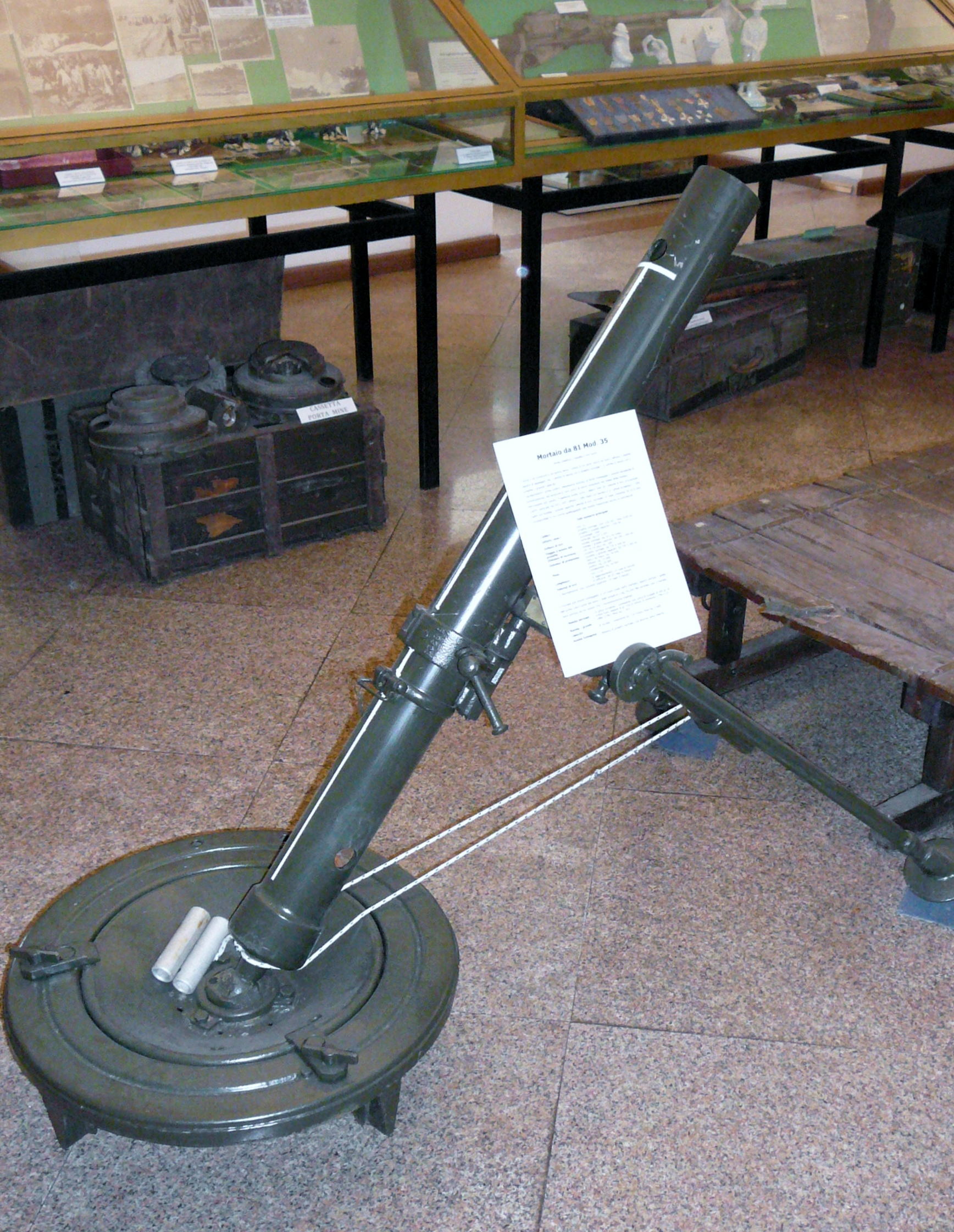
- Type: Mortar
- Place of origin: Kingdom of Italy

Service history
- Used by: Kingdom of Italy
- Wars: Second World War

Production history
- Manufacturer: CEMSA; Arsenale Regio Esercito di Piacenza (AREP)
- No. built: 2177 in June 1940, total production number unknown

Specifications
- Mass: barrel 21.34 kg (47.0 lb), bipod 18.02 kg (39.7 lb), plate 20.026 kg (44.15 lb), total 59.56 kg (131.3 lb)
- Barrel length: 1.151 m (3 ft 9 in) L/14.2
- Shell weight: Light bomb: 3.2 kg (7 lb 1 oz); Heavy bomb: 6.8 kg (15 lb)
- Caliber: 81 mm (3.2 in)
- Elevation: 40°-90°
- Traverse: 8.3°
- Rate of fire: 18 rounds per minute
- Muzzle velocity: Light bomb: 255 m/s (840 ft/s); Heavy bomb: 135 m/s (440 ft/s)
- Effective firing range: Light bomb: 4 km (2.5 mi); Heavy bomb: 1.5 km (0.93 mi)

The Mortaio da 81 Mod. 35 was an Italian World War II infantry mortar. It was the standard weapon of the Italian Army during the war, of typical Brandt-system construction, but relatively lightweight, with good range and considered very successful.

The weapon used two kinds of ammunition, a heavy high-explosive shell weighing 6.86 kg (15.1 lb) and a lighter shell weighing 3.26 kg (7.2 lb) for long distance fire.

== History ==
=== Development ===
The Royal Italian Army during the Great War had employed, alongside the various models of grenade launchers and mortars, the innovative mortar ML 3 inch Stokes. In the early thirties the Kingdom of Italy bought the Brandt 81 mm Mle 1927 directly in France, derived from the Stokes, to equip the troops sent to Ethiopia. Trials concluded that the Brandt was so great a weapon that, in addition to having a significant commercial success, in a few years was built under license or copied in most of the major countries of the world. Even in Italy in fact the company Costruzioni Elettro-Meccaniche di Saronno, in addition to producing the Brandt license, created an improved version, the Mortaio da 81 Mod. 35, which proved to be the best of the mortars of the Royal Italian Army.

At the end of the thirties the CEMSA privately developed an enhanced version of Mod. 35, proposed to the Italian armed forces and on the foreign market, the CEMSA 81 mm L.P. (Lunga Portata, or "long-range"). This piece, which faithfully modeled on the setting of the Mod. 35, differed especially for the presence of a cooling system of the barrel.

=== Use ===
When Italy entered World War II on June 10, 1940, the Royal Italian Army had roughly 2177 pieces Mod. 35. in service. According to Pariani, in each infantry division there must be a battalion of mortars with two mortars companies of 81mm type; another company was organic to each of the two regiments of infantry. After the armistice of Cassibile the Mod. 35 was also used by the National Republican Army of the Italian Social Republic and remained in service with the Italian Army until the sixties.

During the Winter War, as part of the Italian military aid to Finland (also including carbines Carcano Mod. 38) were ordained a hundred Mod. 35, called KRH 81/36-I; the "KRH" acronym is short for kranaatinheitin ("mortar") in Finnish; the letters "I" stands for italialainen ("Italian") and served to distinguish the piece of CEMSA from other derivatives French Brandt and his Polish and Hungarian products, all purchased by the Nordic country. During the Continuation War, the same Italian mortars ended up in the hands of the Wehrmacht, and was renamed 8.1 cm GrW 276 (i). They were joined by 200 mortars delivered in April 1944 by CEMSA to the Germans who occupied northern Italy.
