= 151st Infantry Regiment "Sassari" =

Active Italian Army infantry unit

- 151° Reggimento Fanteria "Sassari"
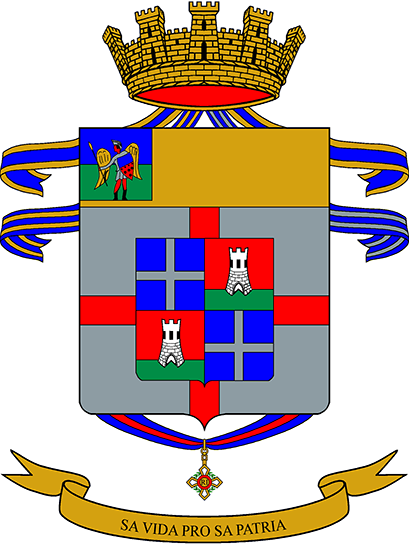
- Regimental coat of arms
- Active: 1 March 1915 – 10 Sept. 1943; 1 April 1962 – 30 Sept. 1975; 1 Jan. 1976 – today
- Country: Italy
- Branch: Italian Army
- Part of: Mechanized Brigade "Sassari"
- Garrison/HQ: Cagliari
- Nicknames: Dimonios; Diavoli Rossi (Red Devils)
- Motto: "Sa vida pro sa Patria"
- Anniversaries: 28 January 1918 – Reconquest of Col del Rosso and Col d'Echele
- Decorations: 2× Military Order of Italy; 2× Gold Medals of Military Valor; 1× Gold Medal of Army Valor; 1× Silver Medal of Army Valor; 1× Gold Cross of Army Merit

Insignia
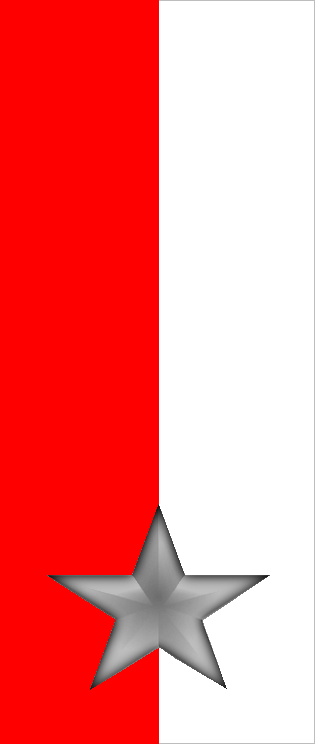
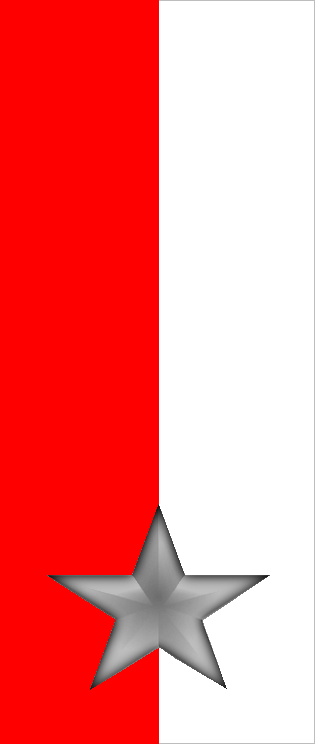
- Regimental gorget patches

The 151st Infantry Regiment "Sassari" (Italian: 151° Reggimento Fanteria "Sassari") is an active unit of the Italian Army based in Cagliari in Sardinia. The regiment is named for the city of Sassari and part of the Italian Army's infantry arm. As of 2023 the regiment is assigned to the Mechanized Brigade "Sassari".

The regiment was formed in preparation for Italy's entry into World War I. During the war the regiment fought on the Italian front and was awarded, together with its sister-regiment the 152nd Infantry Regiment "Sassari", two times Italy's highest military honor the Gold Medal of Military Valor, making the two regiments the only units to be twice so honored during the entire war. During World War II the regiment was assigned to the 12th Infantry Division "Sassari", which in 1941 participated in the invasion of Yugoslavia. Afterwards the division remained in Yugoslavia on occupation duty. In March 1943 the division was transferred to Rome, where it was informed of the Armistice of Cassibile on 8 September 1943. Tasked with defending Rome from invading German forces the regiment was forced to surrender on 10 September. In 1962 the regiment was reformed and based in Trieste. In 1975 the regiment was disbanded and on 1 January 1976 it was reformed as a battalion sized training unit in Cagliari. In 1992 the regiment was reformed and has been active as mechanized unit since then.

== History ==
=== Formation ===
On 1 March 1915 the 151st Infantry Regiment (Brigade "Sassari") was formed in Sinnai near Cagliari in the South of Sardinia. On the same date the 152nd Infantry Regiment (Brigade "Sassari") and the command of the Brigade "Sassari" were formed in Tempio Pausania near Sassari in the North of Sardinia. The brigade consisted of personnel levied in Sardinia by the following pre-war regiments:

- 45th Infantry Regiment (Brigade "Reggio") in Tempio Pausania: Command of the Brigade "Sassari" and 152nd Infantry Regiment
- 46th Infantry Regiment (Brigade "Reggio") in Sinnai: 151st Infantry Regiment

Each regiment consisted of three battalions, which each fielded four fusilier companies and one machine gun section. The Brigade "Sassari" formed, together with the Brigade "Macerata", the 25th Division.

=== World War I ===
During World War I the Brigade "Sassari" fought on the Italian front: in July 1915 during the First Battle of the Isonzo on the Karst plateau and then in November during the Fourth Battle of the Isonzo on the slopes of Monte San Michele. On 15 May 1916 Austro-Hungary commenced the Battle of Asiago and the brigade was transferred to the Sette Comuni plateau. On 16 June 1916 the brigade entered the line to retake the Italian positions on Monte Castelgomberto and Monte Fior. By 18 June the positions were back in Italian hands, but the brigade had suffered 3,120 casualties, more than half of the personnel it had entered the front with.

On 3 August 1916 King Victor Emmanuel III awarded to the regiments of the Brigade "Sassari" Italy's highest military honor, the Gold Medal of Military Valor, for having retaken the lost Italian positions on the Sette Comuni plateau. On the same day the regiments of the Brigade "Regina" were awarded a Gold Medal of Military Valor, making the two brigades the first Italian units to be so awarded during the war.

In June 1917 the brigade attacked Austro-Hungarian positions on Monte Zebio and in September the brigade was back in the East on the Banjšice plateau for the Eleventh Battle of the Isonzo. After the Italian defeat in the Battle of Caporetto the brigade fought delaying actions at Buttrio and on the Monticano river from 27 October to 8 November. From 10 December 1917 the brigade was back on the Sette Comuni plateau.

From 28 to 31 January 1918 the brigade retook the Italian positions on Col del Rosso and Col d'Echelle at the cost of 897 casualties. In June the brigade defended Croce di Musile and Losson on the Piave river during the Second Battle of the Piave River. During the Battle of Vittorio Veneto the brigade attacked over the Piave at San Lucia di Piave and after breaking through the Austro-Hungarian lines advanced to Sacile, where brigade reached the news of the Armistice of Villa Giusti.

On 15 June 1920 the King awarded the regiments of the Brigade "Sassari" for having retaken Col del Rosso and Col d'Echelle with a second Gold Medal of Military Valor, making the two regiments the only units to be twice awarded a Gold Medal during the entire war.

=== Interwar years ===
After World War I the Royal Italian Army disbanded the brigades and the regiments raised during the war, with the exception of brigades, whose regiments had both been awarded a Gold Medal of Military Valor. As the regiments of the Sassari had no regimental depots of their own, the brigade moved in 1920 to the newly conquered Austrian Littoral, where the brigade took over the barracks of the Austro-Hungarian Army in Trieste.

On 28 October 1926 the brigade was renamed XII Infantry Brigade and its two regiments were renamed 151st Infantry Regiment "Sassari", respectively 152nd Infantry Regiment "Sassari". On the same date the 151st Sassari received a battalion from the disbanded 32nd Infantry Regiment (Brigade "Siena"), while the brigade received the 12th Infantry Regiment "Casale" from the disbanded Brigade "Casale". The XII Infantry Brigade was the infantry component of the 12th Territorial Division of Trieste.

In 1934, the 12th Territorial Division of Trieste changed its name to 12th Infantry Division "Timavo". A name change that also extended to the division's infantry brigade. In 1935 the regiment formed the DXVIII Divisional Machine Gunners Battalion for the Second Italo-Ethiopian War. On 24 May 1939 the XII Infantry Brigade "Timavo" was disbanded and the two infantry regiments "Sassari" came under direct command of the division, which changed its name to 12th Infantry Division "Sassari".

=== World War II ===
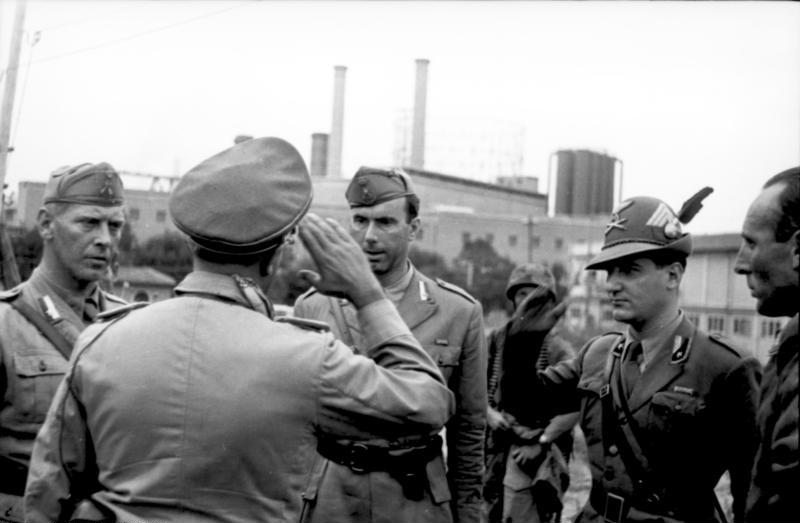
Sassari officers on the left and an Alpino officer negotiating with German paratroopers during the fighting in Rome in 1943

At the outbreak of World War II the regiment consisted of a command, a command company, three fusilier battalions, a support weapons battery equipped with 65/17 infantry support guns, and a mortar company equipped with 81mm Mod. 35 mortars. On 6 April 1941 the division participated in the invasion of Yugoslavia and for the next two years the division's command was based in Knin, while the division's units were employed in anti-partisan operations in the surrounding area. In March 1943, after the Battle of the Neretva, the division was transferred to Rome to defend the city in case of an allied attack.

After the announcement of the Armistice of Cassibile on 8 September 1943 the division was tasked with defending Rome from Italy's former German allies. Together with the 21st Infantry Division "Granatieri di Sardegna" and 135th Armored Cavalry Division "Ariete", the Carabinieri Legion "Roma", and other minor units the Sassari fought the German 2nd Fallschirmjäger Division for two days. On 10 September 1943 the I and II battalions of the 151st Infantry Regiment "Sassari" joined the grenadiers of the "Granatieri di Sardegna" division, the lancers of the Regiment "Lancieri di Montebello", and hundreds of civilians at Porta San Paolo for a last stand. By 17:00 the Germans broke the line of the Italian defenders, who had suffered 570 dead. Soon after the Italian military units surrendered to the Germans as the flight of the King Victor Emmanuel III from Rome made further resistance senseless. Before surrendering the Italian soldiers handed their weapons over to the civilian population, which was quick to form an organized resistance movement in the city.

=== Cold War ===
On 1 April 1962 the regiment was reformed in Trieste as 151st Infantry Regiment "Sassari". On 1 September 1962 regiment entered the newly raised Trieste Military Command, which was tasked with the defence of the city. The regiment's structure was as follows:

- 151st Infantry Regiment "Sassari", in Trieste
  - Command Company, in Trieste
  - I Battalion, in Trieste
  - II Battalion, in Trieste
  - III Battalion, in Trieste
  - Anti-tank Company, in Trieste

During the 1975 army reform the army disbanded the regimental level and newly independent battalions were granted for the first time their own flags. On 30 September 1975 the 151st Infantry Regiment "Sassari" and the regiment's II and III battalion were disbanded, while the next day the I Battalion was renamed 1st Motorized Infantry Battalion "San Giusto".

On 31 December 1975 the 152nd Infantry Regiment "Sassari" in Sardinia was disbanded and the next day the regiment's II Battalion in Cagliari was renamed 151st Infantry Battalion "Sette Comuni" and assigned the flag and traditions of the 151st Infantry Regiment "Sassari", while the I Battalion in Sassari was renamed 152nd Infantry Battalion "Sassari" and the III Battalion in Macomer was reduced to a detachment of the "Sette Comuni" battalion. The battalions remained assigned to the Sardinia Military Command and continued to train recruits. To avoid confusion with the 152nd Infantry Battalion "Sassari" the 151st Infantry Battalion's name was changed from "Sassari" to "Sette Comuni" to commemorate the location, where the two regiments had earned their first Gold Medal of Military Valor. On 1 February 1977 the detachment in Macomer was reorganized as 45th Infantry Battalion "Arborea" and assigned the flag and traditions of the 45th Infantry Regiment "Reggio".

On 1 January 1985 the battalion was reorganized as 151st Motorized Infantry Battalion "Sette Comuni" and consisted now of a command, a command and services company, three motorized companies, and a heavy mortar company equipped with towed 120mm Mod. 63 mortars. On 1 December 1988 the battalion was assigned to the reformed Motorized Brigade "Sassari".

=== Recent times ===
On 31 December 1991 the battalion was reorganized as a mechanized unit and consisted now of a command, a command and services company, three mechanized companies equipped with M113 armored personnel carriers, and a heavy mortar company equipped with M106 mortar carriers with 120mm Mod. 63 mortars.

On 22 July 1992 the 151st Mechanized Infantry Battalion "Sette Comuni" lost its autonomy and the next day the battalion entered the reformed 151st Infantry Regiment "Sassari" as I Mechanized Battalion.

On 21 May 2025, the regiment was awarded the Silver Medal of Army Valor for its conduct during its deployment to Lebanon as part of the United Nations Interim Force in Lebanon from August 2024 to February 2025, which coincided with the Hezbollah–Israel conflict that had started in October 2023.

== Organization ==
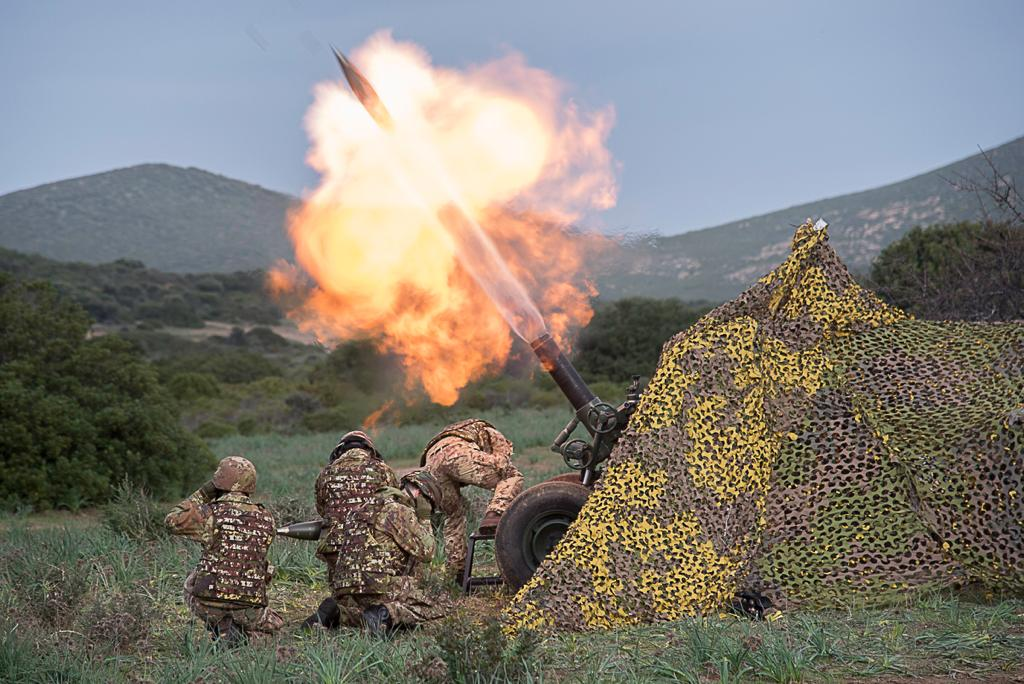
151st "Sassari" mortar team

As of 2023 the 151st Infantry Regiment "Sassari" is organized as follows:

- 151st Infantry Regiment "Sassari", in Cagliari
  - Command and Logistic Support Company
  - 1st Mechanized Battalion
    - 1st Fusiliers Company
    - 2nd Fusiliers Company
    - 3rd Fusiliers Company
    - Maneuver Support Company

The regiment is equipped with VTLM Lince vehicles. The Maneuver Support Company is equipped with 120mm mortars and Spike MR anti-tank guided missiles.

== See also ==
- Mechanized Brigade "Sassari"
