= Mechanized Brigade "Sassari" =

Italian Army brigade

Sassari Mechanized Brigade
- Brigata Meccanizzata "Sassari"
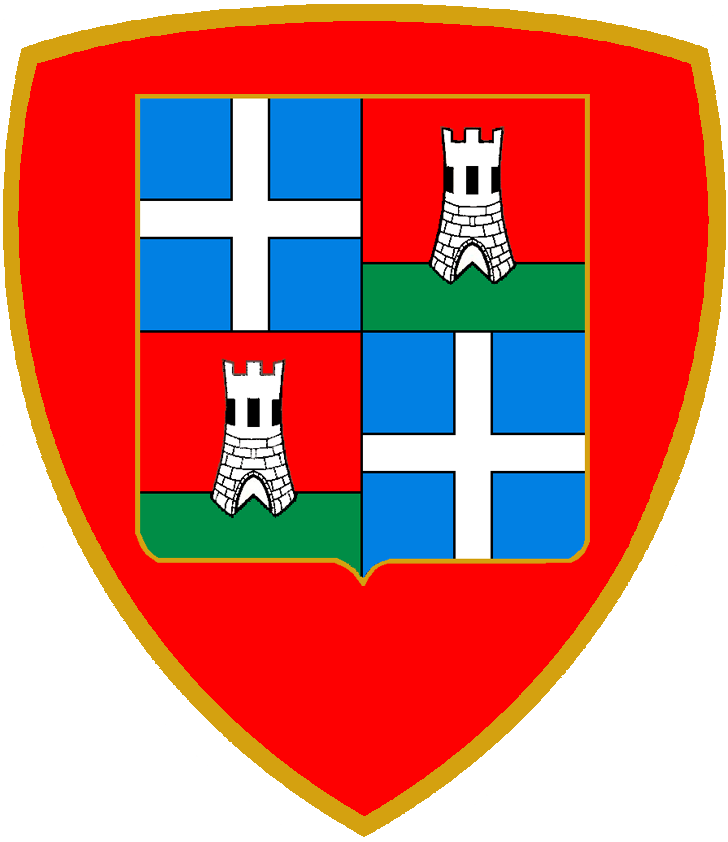
- Coat of arms of the Sassari Mechanized Brigade
- Active: March 1, 1915 – March 11, 1926; Sassari Brigade; March 11, 1926 - 1934; 12th Infantry Brigade; 1934 - 1939; Timavo Infantry Brigade; 1939 - September 10, 1943; Sassari Infantry Division; December 1, 1988 - January 1, 1991; Sassari Motorized Brigade; January 1, 1991 – today Sassari Mechanized Brigade
- Country: Italy
- Branch: Italian Army
- Type: Mechanized infantry
- Size: Brigade
- Part of: Multinational Division South
- Garrison/HQ: Sassari
- Mottos: "Sa vida pro sa Patria" (Sardinian) (English: "One's life spent for the [Italian] homeland")
- Colors: red and white
- March: Dimonios
- Anniversaries: 28 January 1918
- Engagements: World War I World War II; Bosnia SFOR; Kosovo KFOR; Afghanistan ISAF; Iraq Multinational force in Iraq

Commanders
- Current commander: Brigadier Andrea Di Stasio

The Sassari Mechanized Brigade is a mechanized infantry brigade of the Italian Army, based on the island of Sardinia. Its core are three infantry regiments which distinguished themselves in combat during World War I. Carrying the name of the Sardinian city of Sassari the brigade's coat of arms is modeled after the city's coat of arms. The brigade is part of the Multinational Division South.

== History ==
=== World War I ===
In preparation for entering World War I the Royal Italian Army activated on 1 March 1915 the Brigade "Sassari" with the 151st Infantry Regiment, which was mustered in Sinnai, and the 152nd Infantry Regiment, which was mustered in Tempio Pausania. The Brigade "Sassari" was raised exclusively with reservists from Sardinia by the following pre-war regiments:

- 45th Infantry Regiment (Brigade "Reggio") in Sassari: Brigade "Sassari" Command and 152nd Infantry Regiment
- 46th Infantry Regiment (Brigade "Reggio") in Cagliari: 151st Infantry Regiment

The brigade first saw action in the summer of 1915 during the First Battle of the Isonzo and distinguished itself in the Second Battle of the Isonzo. In May 1916 the brigade was sent to the Asiago Plateau to help in the Italian effort to stop the Austrians spring offensive. In the month of June 1916 the brigade seized Monte Fior, Monte Castelgomberto, Monte Spil, Monte Miela and Monte Zebio. For these actions both regiments of the brigade were awarded a Gold Medal of Military Valor.

After the Italian defeat at the Battle of Caporetto and the subsequent retreat of the remnants of the Italian Army towards the Piave, the Sassari fought under the command of general Armando Tallarigo with extraordinary discipline and toughness. In fact the last battalion to retreat over the Piave to safety was a battalion of the Sassari.

Between 28 and 31 January 1918 the Sassari was again in the first line during the first Italian offensive operations after the Army had spent the second half of 1917 in a defensive posture. To the north of Vicenza the brigade managed to capture the Col del Rosso, Col d’Echele and Monte Valbella and for this feat was awarded a second Gold Medal of Military Valor for both its regiments. A feat not achieved by any other brigade in the course of the war. At the end of the war the Sassari was the most decorated Italian unit of World War I, and individual soldiers of the Brigade were awarded:

- 6 Military Orders of Savoia
- 13 Gold Medals of Military Valor
- 405 Silver Medals of Military Valor
- 551 Bronze Medals of Military Valor

The brigade had suffered the highest loss rate of all Italian infantry brigades in the war: 2,164 dead, and 12,858 wounded and missing in action; a death rate of 13.8% of all men who had served in the brigade during the war. The Italian writer Emilio Lussu had served in the brigade during World War I and would later write an anti-war book about his experiences: A Year on the High Plateau ("Un anno sull'altipiano").

=== Interwar years ===
After the war the regiments raised during the war were dissolved, with the exception of those, who had been awarded a Gold Medal of Military Valour. After the war the Brigade "Sassari" was based in Trieste. In autumn 1926 the brigade assumed the name of XII Infantry Brigade and received the 12th Infantry Regiment "Casale" from the disbanded Brigade "Casale". The brigade was the infantry component of the 12th Territorial Division of Trieste, which also included the 34th Artillery Regiment. On 24 May 1939 the division dissolved the XII Infantry Brigade, with the two remaining infantry regiments coming under direct command of the division, which changed its name to 12th Infantry Division "Sassari".

=== World War II ===
The division remained in Istria on garrison duty until 6 April 1941 when Axis forces began the invasion of Yugoslavia. The first Yugoslav cities to fall were Prezid and Čabar on 12 April, followed Novi Lazi and Borovec on 14 April. On 19 April the division reached Delnice, and the following day Knin. For the next two years the division's command remained in Knin, while the division's units were continuously deployed in anti-partisan operations: in Šibenik, Brod na Kupi, Gračac, Petrovac and Drvar. The heaviest fighting occurred during July 1942 when the division tried to clear partisan forces out of the Velebit mountains.

In March 1943, after the Battle of the Neretva, the division transferred to Rome to aid in the defense of the city in case of an Allied attack. During this time the division was reorganized along the lines of the Mod.43 reform of the Italian Army and was augmented with the XII Mortar Battalion and the XII Self-propelled Battalion which was equipped with 24 Semovente 75/18 self-propelled guns. In all the division fielded 14,500 troops, 24 self-propelled and 80 artillery pieces. After the Armistice between Italy and Allied armed forces of 8 September 1943 the division found itself fighting Italy's former allies the Germans and along with the 21st Infantry Division "Granatieri di Sardegna" and 135th Armored Division "Ariete" II the Sassari defended Rome for two days. On 10 September 1943 the remnants of the Sassari joined the 21st Infantry Division "Granatieri di Sardegna" and the cavalry Regiment "Lancieri di Montebello" (8th) and hundreds of civilian volunteers at Porta San Paolo for a last stand. Civilians at Porta San Paolo included communist leader Luigi Longo, lawyer Giuliano Vassalli, writer and WWI Sassari veteran Emilio Lussu, unionist leader Vincenzo Baldazzi, Mario Zagari, retired Air Force generals Sabato Martelli Castaldi and Roberto Lordi, and 18-year-old future partisan leader Marisa Musu. The future Italian president Sandro Pertini brought a detachment of socialist resistance fighters to Porta San Paolo and around 12:30 the Catholic Communist movement arrived with further reinforcements including famed actor Carlo Ninchi. However, by 17:00 the Germans broke the line of the Italian defenders, who had suffered 570 dead. Soon after the Italian military units surrendered to the Germans as the flight of the Italian King Victor Emmanuel III from Rome had made further resistance senseless. However the Italian soldiers handed thousands of weapons over to the civilian population, which was quick to form an organized resistance movement in the city of Rome.

=== Recent history ===
The Sassari was raised again in Sardinia on 1 December 1988 as Motorized Brigade "Sassari" with two light infantry battalions:

- Motorized Brigade "Sassari", in Sassari
  - Command and Signal Unit "Sassari", in Sassari (activated 30 July 1991)
    - Headquarters Company, in Sassari
    - Signal Company, in Sassari
  - 151st Motorized Infantry Battalion "Sette Comuni", in Cagliari
  - 152nd Infantry (Recruits Training) Battalion "Sassari", in Sassari

The brigade was under command of the Sardinia Military Command (CMS) in Cagliari, which had administrative command of all units based in Sardinia and was furthermore tasked with the defense of the island in case of war. Besides the Sassari the following units were based on Sardinia:

- CMS Command Battalion, in Cagliari
- 1st Armored Infantry Regiment, in Teulada (Armored Training Center)
  - Command Company
  - I Armored Infantry Battalion (with a mix of Leopard 1A2 main battle tanks and VCC-2 armored personnel carriers)
  - II Armored Infantry (Reserve) Battalion
  - 170th Self-propelled Field Artillery Group
  - Logistic Battalion
- 45th Infantry (Recruits Training) Battalion "Arborea", in Macomer
- 21st Light Aviation Squadrons Group "Orsa Maggiore", at Cagliari-Elmas Air Base
- 47th Signal Battalion "Gennargentu", in Cagliari
- 12th Mixed Transport Battalion, in Cagliari
- 12th Medical Company, in Cagliari
- 12th Supply Company, in Nuoro
- 12th Maintenance Company, in Cagliari

After the end of the Cold War the Italian Army disbanded a large number of mechanized brigades in Northern Italy, the equipment of the disbanded units was used to mechanize the Sassari brigade with VCC-2 armored personnel carriers. Accordingly, the brigade changed its name on 1 January 1991 to Mechanized Brigade "Sassari". Over the next years the Sassari became a fully professionalized brigade, one of the first Italian brigades to do so. In the early 1990s the Italian Army began to rename its battalions for traditional reasons as regiment; thus the Sassari consisted, by the end of 1993, of the following units:

- Mechanized Brigade "Sassari", in Sassari
  - Command and Tactical Supports Unit "Sassari", in Sassari
    - Headquarter Company
    - Signal Company
    - Engineer Company
  - 45th Regiment "Reggio" (Recruit Training), in Macomer
  - 151st Infantry Regiment "Sassari", in Cagliari (Regiment on 30 July 1992)
  - 152nd Infantry Regiment "Sassari", in Sassari (Regiment on 25 October 1992)

The brigade saw two changes to its structure in the following years: on 1 January 2003 the 45th Infantry Regiment "Reggio" was reorganized as 5th Engineer Regiment, which entered the brigade on 23 September 2003 and received the Command and Tactical Supports Unit's Engineer Company, and on 25 November 2009 the 3rd Bersaglieri Regiment moved from Milan to Teulada, where it merged with the I Battalion of the 1st Armored Infantry Regiment.

The Brigade has been deployed repeatedly in out of area operations and has served in Kosovo, Bosnia, Lebanon, Afghanistan and in Iraq, where it lost seven soldiers in various engagements with Iraqi insurgents.

== Organization ==
Sassari units 2022

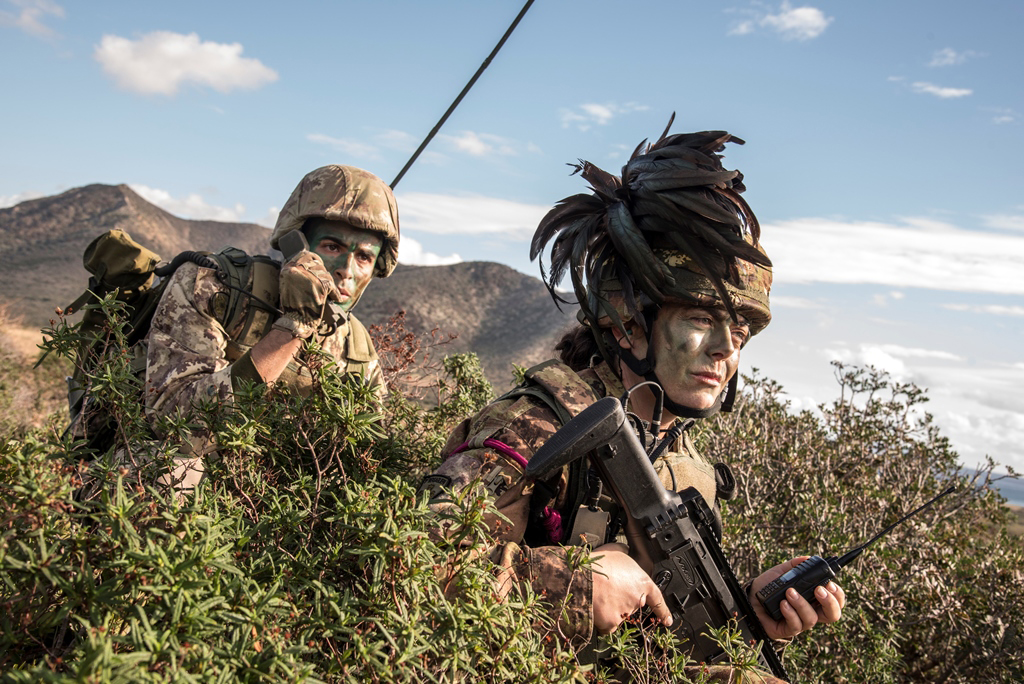
3rd Bersaglieri Regiment lieutenant with her radioman during an exercise in Sardinia

As of 4 October 2022 the brigade is organized as follows:

- Mechanized Brigade "Sassari", in Sassari
  - 45th Command and Tactical Supports Unit "Reggio", in Sassari
    - Command Company
    - Signal Company
  - 3rd Bersaglieri Regiment, in Teulada
    - Regimental Headquarters
    - Command and Logistic Support Company
    - 18th Bersaglieri Battalion "Poggio Scanno"
      - Battalion Headquarters
      - 3x Bersaglieri Companies
      - Maneuver Support Company
  - 151st Infantry Regiment "Sassari", in Cagliari
    - Regimental Headquarters
    - Command and Logistic Support Company
    - 1st Mechanized Battalion
      - Battalion Headquarters
      - 3x Fusiliers Companies
      - Maneuver Support Company
  - 152nd Infantry Regiment "Sassari", in Sassari
    - Regimental Headquarters
    - Command and Logistic Support Company
    - 1st Mechanized Battalion
      - Battalion Headquarters
      - 3x Infantry Companies
      - Maneuver Support Company
  - 5th Engineer Regiment, in Macomer
    - Regimental Headquarters
    - Command and Logistic Support Company
    - Engineer Battalion "Bolsena"
      - Battalion Headquarters
      - 3x Sapper Companies
      - Deployment Support Company
  - Logistic Regiment "Sassari", in Cagliari
    - Regimental Headquarters
    - Command and Logistic Support Company
    - Logistic Battalion
      - Battalion Headquarters
      - Maintenance Company
      - Transport Company
      - Supply Company

With the introduction of Centauro 2 tank destroyers and Freccia EVO Reconnaissance vehicles the brigade will receive a cavalry regiment.

== Equipment ==
The two infantry regiments and the Bersaglieri regiment of the brigade are equipped with VTLM Lince vehicles, which will be joined by Freccia wheeled infantry fighting vehicles, the first shipment of which arrived at the 3rd Bersaglieri Regiment on 6 December 2018.

== Gorget patches ==
The personnel of the brigade's units wears the following gorget patches:

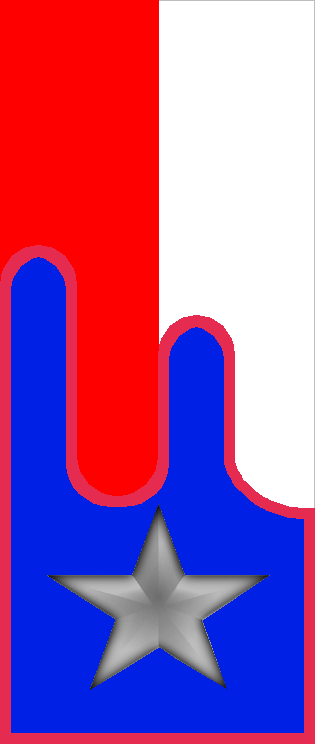
45th Command and Tactical Supports Unit "Reggio"

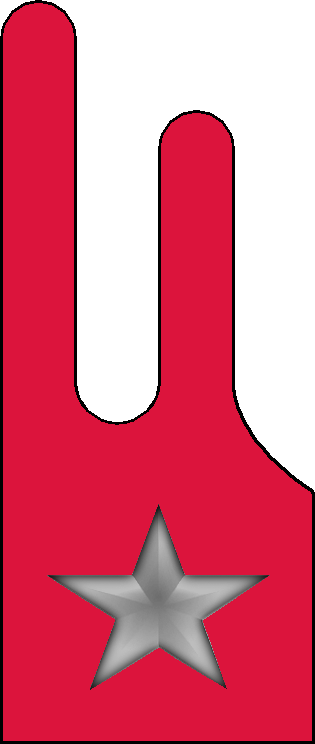
3rd Bersaglieri Regiment

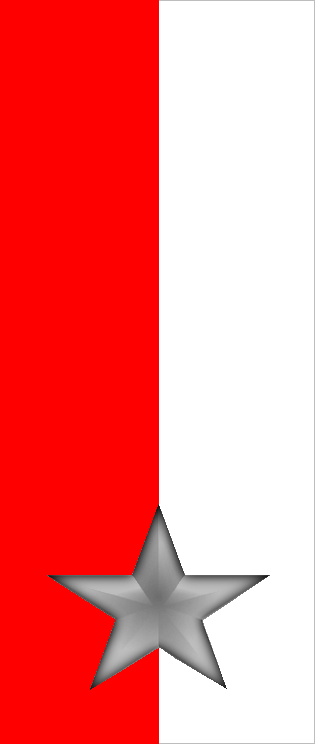
151st Infantry Regiment "Sassari"

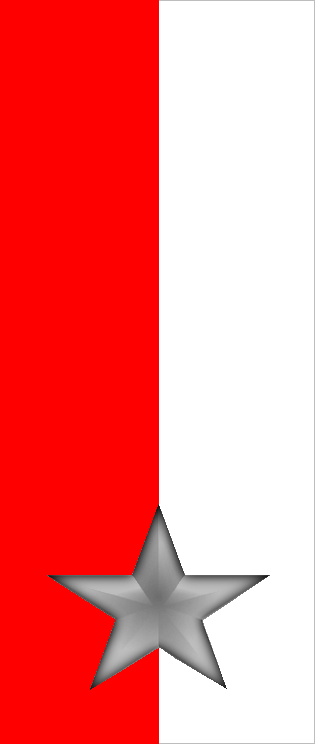
152nd Infantry Regiment "Sassari"

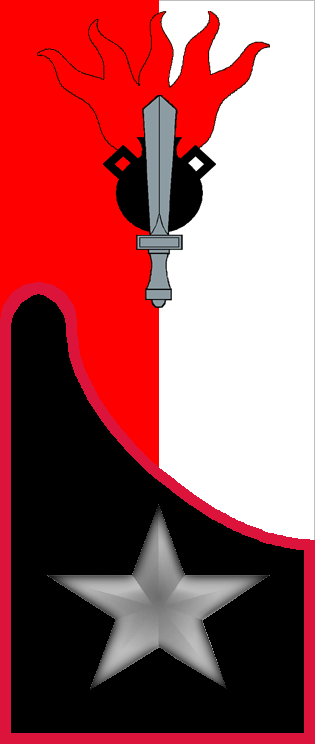
5th Engineer Regiment

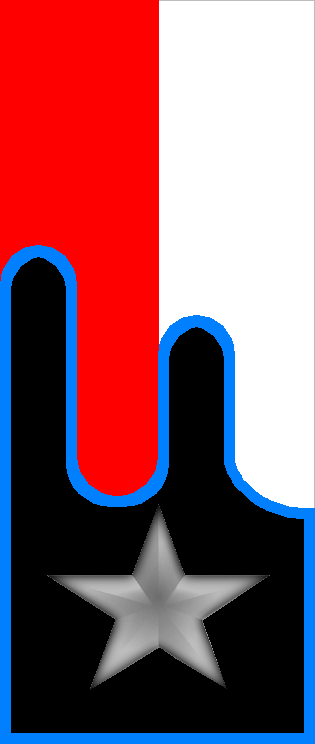
Logistic Regiment "Sassari"

== Trivia ==
- The Sassari Brigade is not the only military unit to have been raised on the island, other units are: the Roman "Cohors II Sardorum", Spanish tercios, the Regiment "Cavalleggeri di Sardegna" and the Cagliari Brigade during the Savoyard period.
- The brigade's march "Dimonios" is sung entirely in Sardinian language.
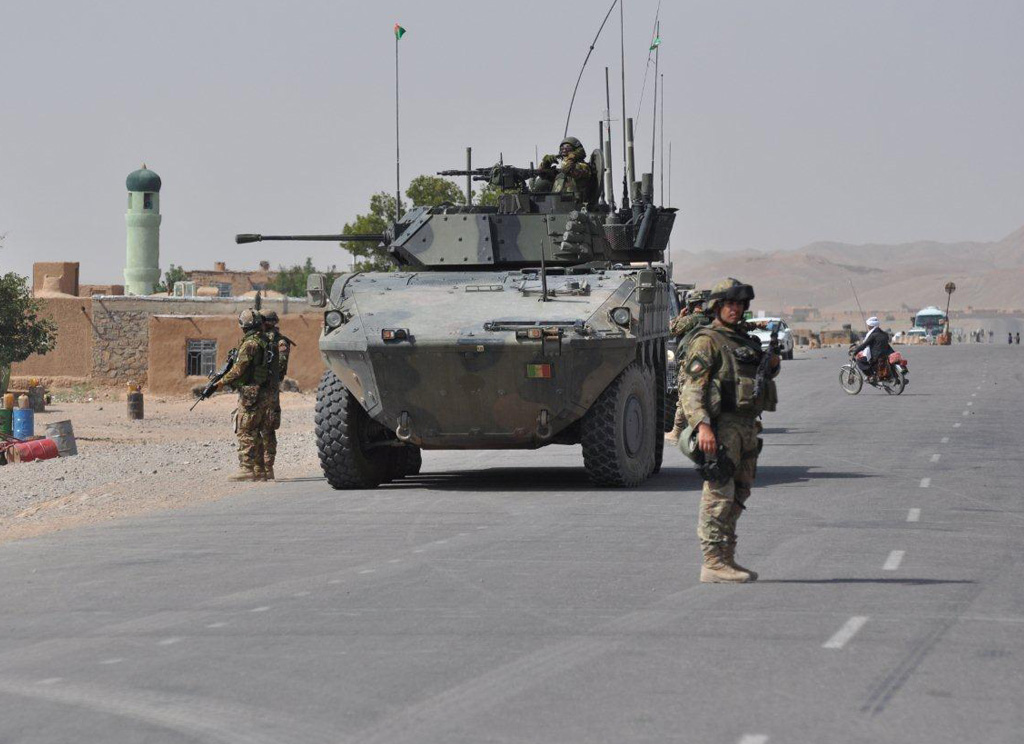
Sassari soldiers on patrol with Freccia IFVs in Afghanistan

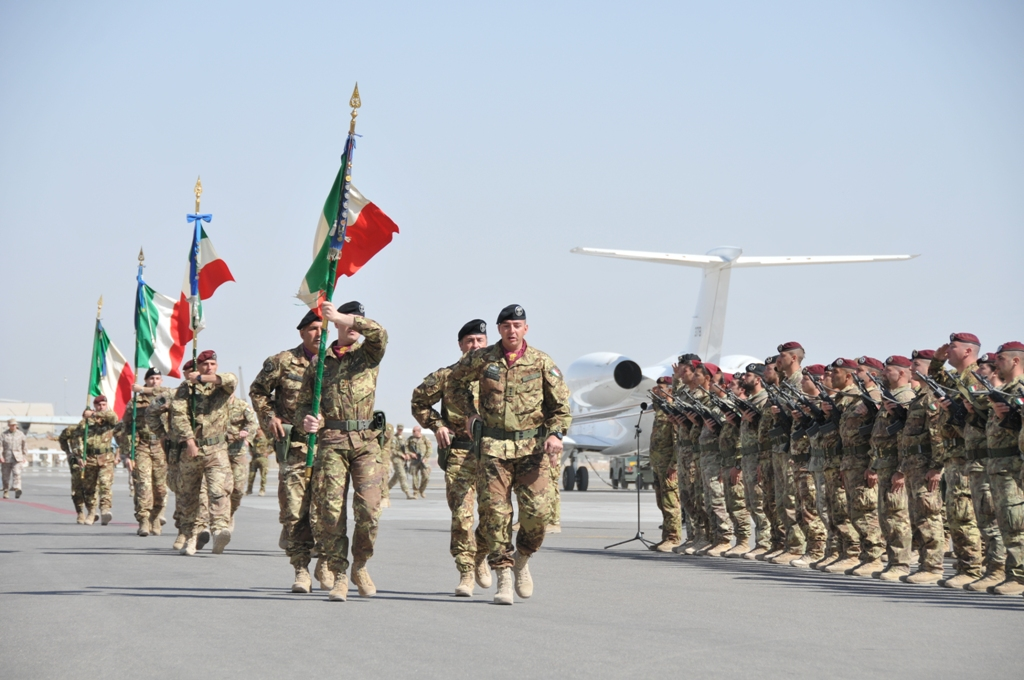
Sassari troops at Herat Airport in Afghanistan

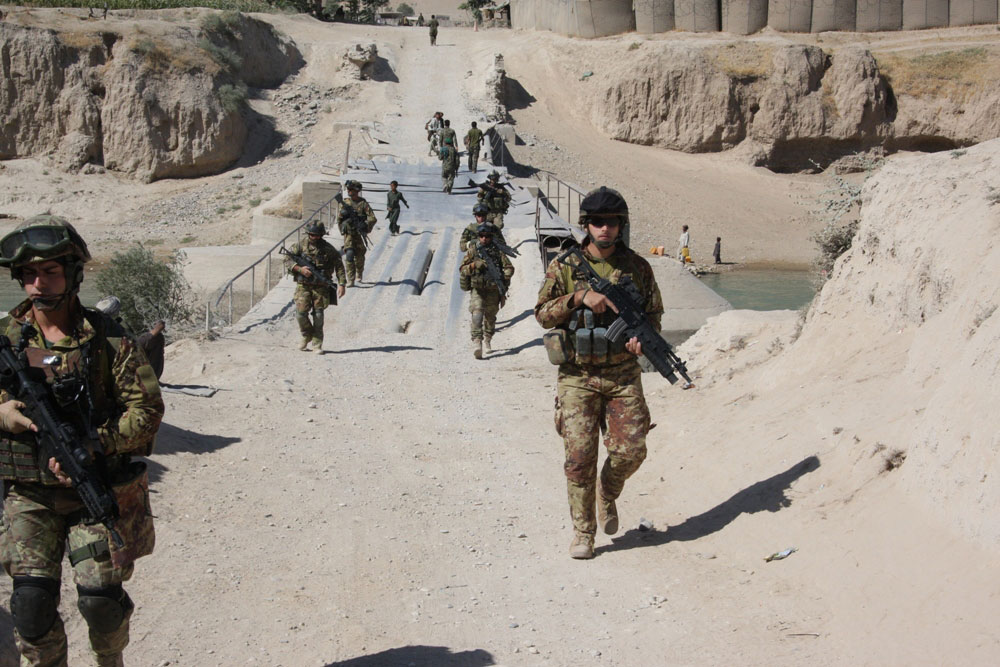
Sassari soldiers on patrol in Afghanistan

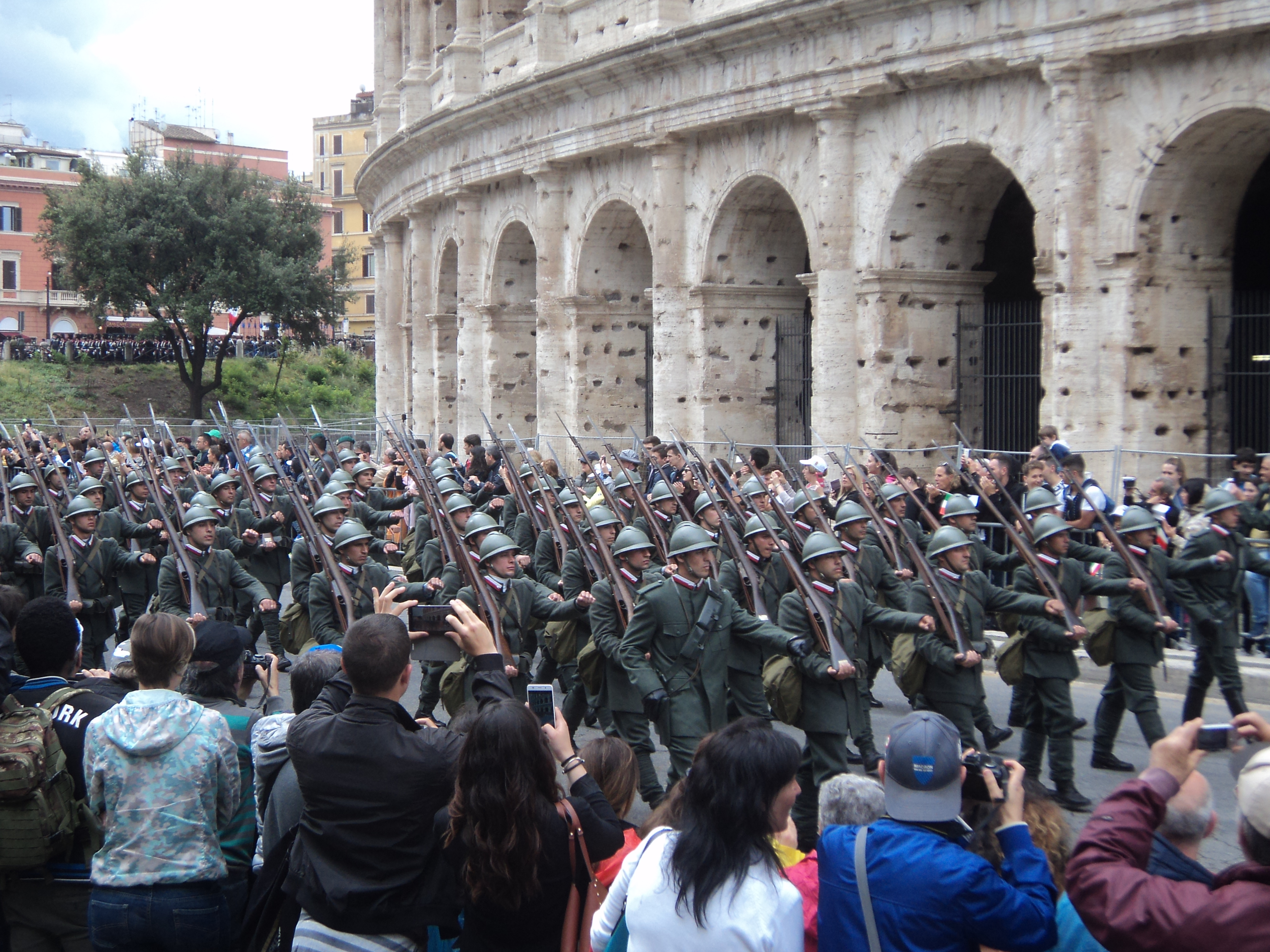
Sassari soldiers in World War I uniforms on parade in Rome
