= 1st Infantry Regiment "San Giusto" =

- 1° Reggimento Fanteria "San Giusto"
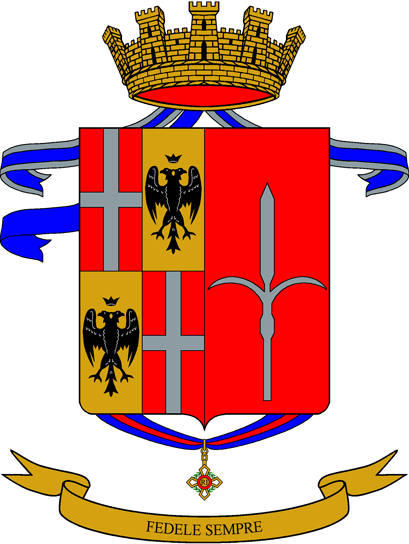
- Regimental coat of arms
- Active: 1624–1798; 1814 – 12 Sept. 1943; 1 Oct. 1975 – 31 March 2008
- Country: Italy
- Branch: Italian Army
- Garrison/HQ: Trieste
- Nickname: "Cravatte Rosse"
- Motto: "Fedele Sempre"
- Anniversaries: 30 October 1918 – Battle of Conca di Alano
- Decorations: 1× Military Order of Italy; 2× Silver Medals of Military Valor; 1× Bronze Medal of Military Valor

Insignia
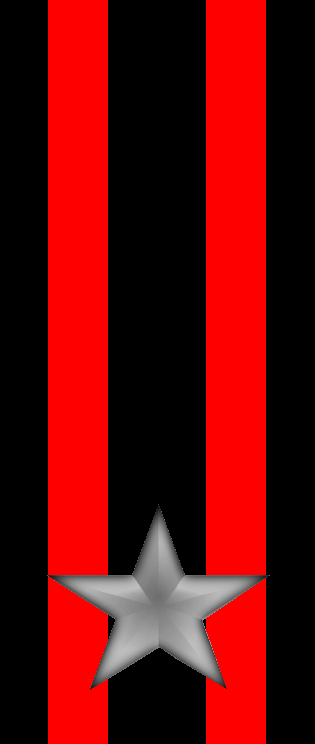
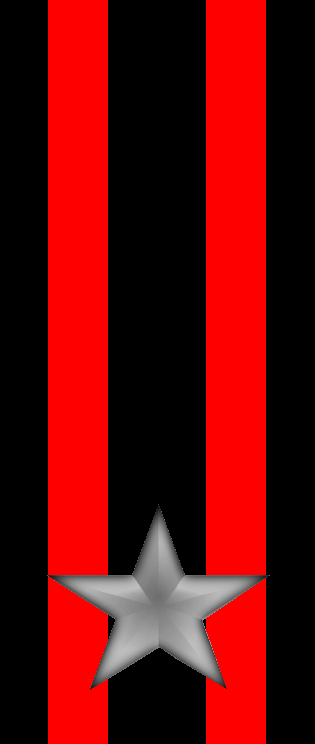
- Regimental gorget patches

The 1st Infantry Regiment "San Giusto" (Italian: 1° Reggimento Fanteria "San Giusto") is an inactive unit of the Italian Army last based in Trieste. Founded in 1624 as Regiment "Fleury" the regiment is part of the Italian army's infantry arm.

== History ==
The 1st Infantry Regiment "San Giusto" is the oldest regiment of the Italian Army, dating back to 1624 when the Marquis Trivier de Fleury established the Regiment "Fleury" with French troops for service in the army of Charles Emmanuel I, Duke of Savoy. The regiment consisted of 15 companies with 100 men each and fought in 1628 in the War of the Mantuan Succession. The regiment served in all the wars of the Savoyard state until 1798 when it was disbanded due to Revolutionary France occupying Piedmont and forcing Charles Emmanuel IV of Sardinia to abdicate the throne in favor of the Piedmontese Republic.

The regiment was reformed in early 1800 as Regiment "Savoia" to fight against the French in the War of the Second Coalition, but after the Austrian defeat on 14 June 1800 at the Battle of Marengo the regiment was disbanded again.

With the defeat of Napoleon at the Battle of Leipzig and the restoration of the Kingdom of Sardinia in 1814 the regiment was reformed. In 1815 it was renamed Brigade "Savoia". On 25 October 1831 the brigade split to form the 1st Regiment and 2nd Regiment under the brigade's command. The brigade and its two regiments fought in the First Italian War of Independence and the 1st Regiment earned a Silver Medal of Military Valor for its conduct during the campaign in Lombardy. The brigade also fought in the Second Italian War of Independence, during which the 1st Regiment was awarded a Bronze Medal of Military Valor for its conduct in the Battle of San Martino. After the Second Italian War of Independence the Second French Empire annexed Savoy on 14 June 1860 and therefore the brigade was renamed on the same day as "Brigade of the King" (Italian: Brigata del Re).

In 1866 the regiment fought in the Third Italian War of Independence.

=== World War I ===
At the outbreak of World War I, the Brigade "Re" formed, together with the Brigade "Pistoia" and the 30th Field Artillery Regiment, the 11th Division. At the time the 1st Infantry Regiment consisted of three battalions, each of which fielded four fusilier companies and one machine gun section. The brigade fought on the Italian front in World War I and the 1st Infantry Regiment "Re" earned its second Silver Medal of Military Valor.

=== World War II ===
The 1st Infantry Regiment "Re" and its sister regiment the 2nd Infantry Regiment "Re" were the infantry component of the 13th Infantry Division "Re". The division served in occupied Yugoslavia until it was ordered to return to Italy on 28 August 1943.

When the Armistice of Cassibile was announced on 8 September 1943 the division's command had arrived with the following units in Monterotondo near Rome:

- I Battalion/ 1st Infantry Regiment "Re"
- III Battalion/ 1st Infantry Regiment "Re"
- III Battalion/ 2nd Infantry Regiment "Re"
- I Group/ 23rd Artillery Regiment "Re"

The rest of the division was still in Florence and Trieste. The 12th Infantry Division "Sassari" detached its II Group/ 34th Artillery Regiment "Sassari" and XII Self-propelled Anti-tank Battalion to the Re, which participated in the defense of Rome against the invading Germans. On 10 September the defenders of Rome surrendered and the Re and its regiments were dissolved by the Germans on 12 September 1943.

=== Cold War ===
With the 1975 army reform the Italian Army abolished the regimental level and battalions came under direct command of the brigades and regional commands. Therefore, on 1 October 1975, the 151st Infantry Regiment "Sassari" of the Trieste Troops Command was disbanded and the regiment's I Battalion was reformed as 1st Motorized Infantry Battalion "San Giusto". The battalion was assigned the flag and traditions of the 1st Infantry Regiment "Re". As Italy had become a Republic the unit's name was changed from "Re" to "Justus of Trieste" the patron saint of the city of Trieste.

With the 1986 reform the Trieste Troops Command was disbanded on 1 October 1986 and the 1st Motorized Infantry Battalion "San Giusto" was transferred to the Mechanized Brigade "Vittorio Veneto". On 1 February 1991 the battalion was renamed 1st Battalion "San Giusto" and tasked with the training of recruits. With the end of the Cold War the "Vittorio Veneto" was disbanded on 31 July 1991 and the 1st Battalion "San Giusto" was transferred to the 5th Army Corps. On 22 September 1992 the battalion was elevated to 1st Regiment "San Giusto".

On 31 March 2008 the 1st Regiment "San Giusto" was disbanded and its flag transferred to the Shrine of the Flags in the Vittoriano in Rome.

== Timeline of the regiment's name ==
During its existence the regiment was named:

- 1624–1631 Regiment "Fleury"
- 1631–1640 Regiment "Marolles"
- 1640–1664 French Regiment "of His Royal Highness"
- 1664–1798 Regiment of Savoy "of His Royal Highness"
- 1814–1815 Regiment "di Savoia"
- 1815–1831 Brigade "Savoia"
- 1831–1839 1st Regiment (Brigade "Savoia")
- 1839–1860 1st Infantry Regiment (Brigade "Savoia")
- 1860–1871 1st Infantry Regiment (Brigade "Re")
- 1871–1981 1st Infantry Regiment "Re"
- 1881–1926 1st Infantry Regiment (Brigade "Re")
- 1926–1943 1st Infantry Regiment "Re"
- 1975–1991 1st Motorized Infantry Battalion "San Giusto"
- 1991–1992 1st Battalion "San Giusto" (Recruits Training)
- 1992–2008 1st Regiment "San Giusto" (Recruits Training)

== Trivia ==
The regiment is the only unit of the Italian infantry arm, which due to its royal lineage, uses red ties instead of the army's standard khaki colored tie, which led to the regiment's nickname "Red Ties" (Italian: Cravatte Rosse).
