= 12th Infantry Division "Sassari" =

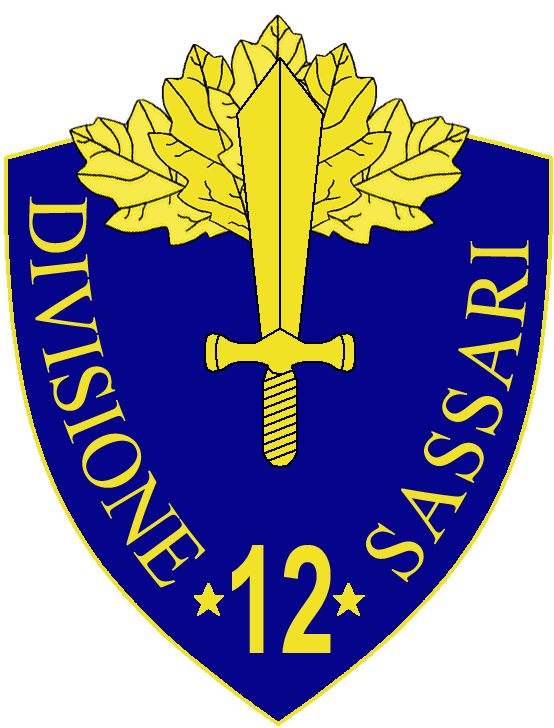
- 12th Infantry Division "Sassari" insignia
- Active: 1939–1943
- Country: Kingdom of Italy
- Branch: Royal Italian Army
- Type: Infantry
- Size: Division
- Garrison/HQ: Trieste
- Engagements: World War II; Battle of the Neretva

Commanders
- Notable commanders: General Giacomo Castagna

Insignia
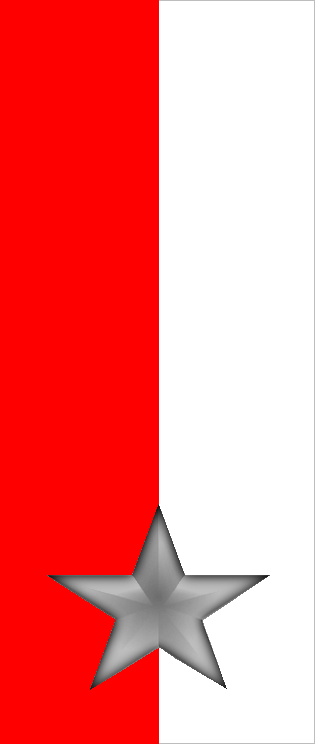
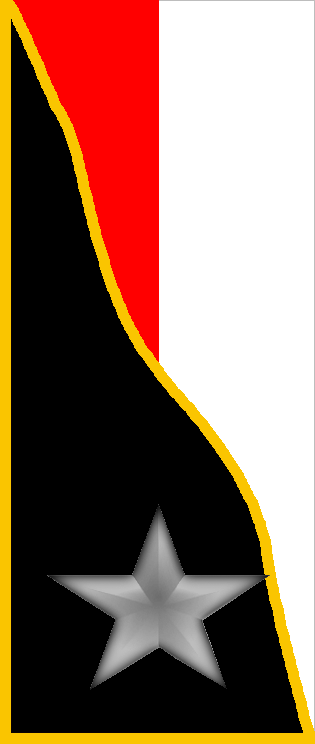
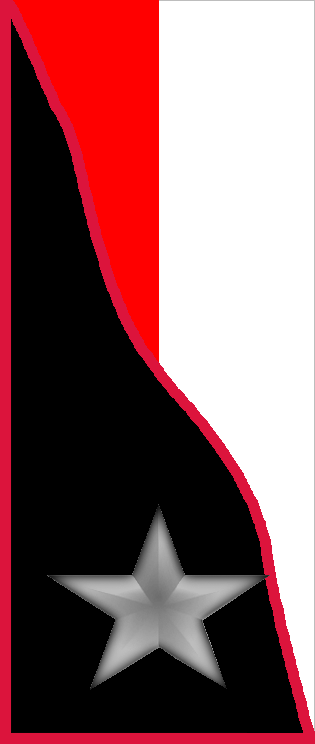
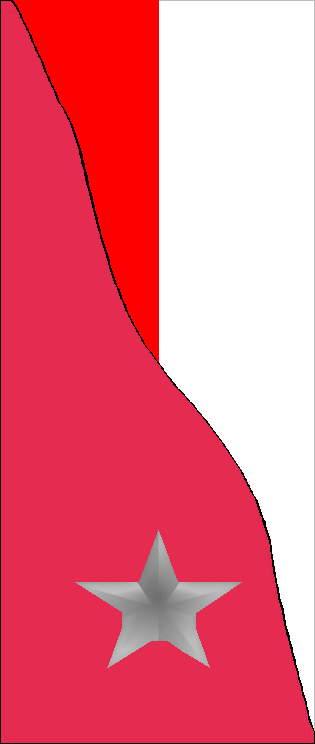
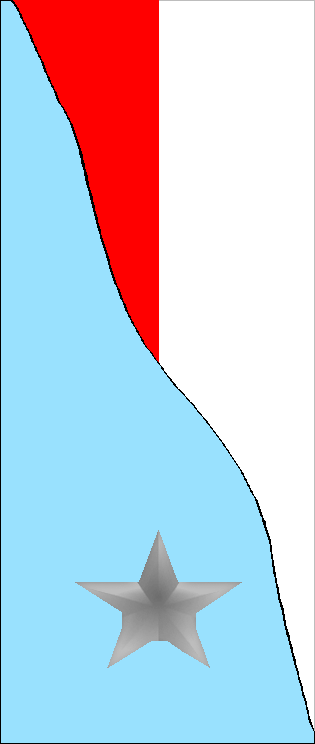
- Identification symbol: Sassari Division gorget patches

The 12th Infantry Division "Sassari" (Italian: 12ª Divisione di fanteria "Sassari") was an infantry division of the Royal Italian Army during World War II. The division recruited primarily in Friuli and Istria and was entirely based in Trieste.

== History ==
=== World War I ===
The division's lineage begins with the Brigade "Sassari" raised in preparation for Italy's entry into World War I on 1 March 1915 with the 151st Infantry Regiment and the 152nd Infantry Regiment, which were manned by reservists from Sardinia. The brigade fought on the Italian front and for their conduct the brigade's two infantry regiments were awarded twice Italy's highest military honor, the Gold Medal of Military Valor. After the war the regiments raised during the war were dissolved, with the exception of those, who had been awarded a Gold Medal of Military Valor.

In autumn 1926 the brigade assumed the name of XII Infantry Brigade and received the 12th Infantry Regiment "Casale" from the disbanded Brigade "Casale". The brigade was the infantry component of the 12th Territorial Division of Trieste, which also included the 34th Artillery Regiment. In 1934 the division changed its name to 12th Infantry Division "Timavo". On 15 May 1939 the division ceded the 34th Artillery Regiment to the 13th Infantry Division "Montenero" and received the newly activated 23rd Artillery Regiment. On 24 May 1939 the 12th Infantry Regiment "Casale" in Trieste changed its name to 73rd Infantry Regiment "Lombardia" and joined the newly activated 57th Infantry Division "Lombardia". On the same day the division dissolved the XII Infantry Brigade, with the two remaining infantry regiments coming under direct command of the division, which changed its name to 12th Infantry Division "Sassari". A name change that also applied to the division's artillery regiment.

=== World War II ===
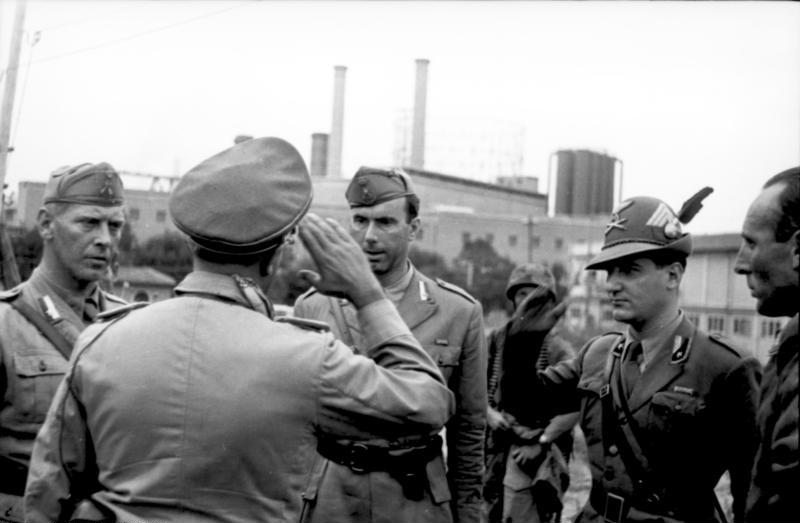
Sassari officers on the left and an Alpino officer negotiating with German paratroopers during the fighting in Rome in 1943

==== Yugoslavia ====
Early in 1940 the division swapped artillery regiments with the 13th Infantry Division "Re". On 10 June 1940, the day Italy entered World War II, the Sassari was deployed along the border with Yugoslavia near Borjana. The division remained in Istria on border patrol duty until the invasion of Yugoslavia on 6 April 1941. The first Yugoslav cities to fall were Prezid and Čabar on 12 April, followed by Novi Lazi and Borovec on 14 April. On 19 April the division reached Delnice, and on the following day Knin. For the next two years the division's command remained in Knin, while the division's units were continuously employed in anti-partisan operations: in Šibenik, Brod na Kupi, Gračac, Petrovac and Drvar. The heaviest fighting occurred in July 1942 when the division tried to clean the Velebit mountains of Partisan forces.

In March 1943, after the Battle of the Neretva, the division was transferred to Rome to defend the city in case of an allied attack. During this time the division was reorganized according to the Model 43 reform. The Sassari received the XII Self-propelled Anti-tank Battalion with 24 Semovente da 47/32 self-propelled guns. In total the division fielded 14,500 troops, 24 Semovente da 47/32 and 80 artillery pieces.

==== Defense of Rome ====
After the announcement of the Armistice of Cassibile on 8 September 1943 the division was tasked to defend Rome from Italy's former allies the Germans. Together with the 21st Infantry Division "Granatieri di Sardegna" and 135th Armored Cavalry Division "Ariete", the Carabinieri Legion "Rome", and other minor units the Sassari fought the German 2nd Fallschirmjäger Division for two days. On 10 September 1943 the remnants of the Sassari joined the grenadiers of the "Granatieri di Sardegna" division, the lancers of the Regiment "Lancieri di Montebello", and hundreds of civilians at Porta San Paolo for a last stand. Civilians at Porta San Paolo included communist leader Luigi Longo, lawyer Giuliano Vassalli, writer Emilio Lussu, unionist leaders Vincenzo Baldazzi and Mario Zagari, retired Air Force generals Sabato Martelli Castaldi and Roberto Lordi, and 18-year-old future partisan leader Marisa Musu. The future Italian president Sandro Pertini brought a detachment of Socialist resistance fighters to Porta San Paolo and around 12:30 the Catholic Communist movement arrived with further reinforcements including famed actor Carlo Ninchi. However by 17:00 the Germans broke the line of the Italian defenders, who had suffered 570 dead. Soon after the Italian military units surrendered to the Germans as the flight of the Italian King Victor Emmanuel III from Rome made further resistance senseless. Before surrendering the Italian soldiers handed thousands of their weapons over to the civilian population, which was quick to form an organized resistance movement in the city.

== Organization ==
12th Infantry Division "Sassari" organization in 1940

- 12th Infantry Division "Sassari", in Trieste
  - Headquarters
    - Command Company
    - 41st Carabinieri Section
    - 42nd Carabinieri Section
    - 86th Field Post Office
    - 12th Infantry Division Command Transport Squad
  - 151st Infantry Regiment "Sassari", in Trieste
    - Command Company
    - 3 × Fusilier battalions
    - Support Weapons Company (65/17 infantry support guns)
    - Mortar Company (81mm mod. 35 mortars)
  - 152nd Infantry Regiment "Sassari", in Trieste
    - Command Company
    - 3 × Fusilier battalions
    - Support Weapons Company (65/17 infantry support guns)
    - Mortar Company (81mm mod. 35 mortars)
  - 34th Artillery Regiment "Sassari", in Trieste
    - Command Unit
    - I Group (75/27 mod. 06 field guns; transferred from the 6th Artillery Regiment "Isonzo")
    - II Group (75/13 mod. 15 mountain guns; transferred from the 6th Artillery Regiment "Isonzo")
    - III Group (75/13 mod. 15 mountain guns; formed by the depot of the 1st Artillery Regiment "Cacciatori delle Alpi")
    - 1 × Anti-aircraft battery (20/65 mod. 35 anti-aircraft guns)
    - Ammunition and Supply Unit
  - XII Mortar Battalion (81mm mod. 35 mortars)
  - 12th Anti-tank Company (47/32 anti-tank guns)
  - 12th Telegraph and Radio Operators Company (entered the CXII Mixed Engineer Battalion in 1943)
  - 34th Engineer Company (entered the CXII Mixed Engineer Battalion in 1943)
  - 8th Medical Section (replaced by the 66th Medical Section in 1943)
    - 33rd Field Hospital
    - 34th Field Hospital
    - 63rd Field Hospital
    - 49th Surgical Unit
  - 12th Autocarrette Section
  - 81st Transport Section
  - 1 × Supply Section (replaced by the 112th Supply Section in 1943)

Attached from 1941:

- 73rd CC.NN. Legion "Boiardo"
  - Command Company
  - XLIX CC.NN. Battalion
  - LXXIII CC.NN. Battalion
  - 73rd CC.NN. Machine Gun Company

During the division's reorganization in 1943 the Sassari was augmented with the following units:

- IV Group, 34th Artillery Regiment "Sassari" (100/17 mod. 14 howitzers)
- V Anti-aircraft Group, 34th Artillery Regiment "Sassari"
- XII Self-propelled Anti-tank Battalion (Semovente da 47/32 self-propelled guns)
- CXII Mixed Engineer Battalion

Attached during the defense of Rome:

- V Sapper Battalion

== Commanding officers ==
The division's commanding officers were:

- Generale di Divisione Riccardo Balocco (9 September 1937 - 5 June 1940)
- Generale di Brigata Michele Scaroina (acting, 6 June 1940 - 9 June 1940)
- Generale di Brigata Gian Giacomo Castagna (10 June 1940 - 10 October 1940)
- Generale di Divisione Furio Monticelli (11 October 1940 - 20 May 1942)
- Generale di Divisione Paolo Berardi (21 May 1942 - 24 February 1943)
- Generale di Brigata Francesco Zani (25 February 1943 - 12 September 1943)

== CROWCASS ==
The names of eight men attached to the division can be found in the Central Registry of War Criminals and Security Suspects (CROWCASS) set up by the Anglo-American Supreme Headquarters Allied Expeditionary Force in 1945. The names can be found at: Central Registry of War Criminals and Security Suspects from the Kingdom of Italy.

== See also ==
- Mechanized Brigade "Sassari" formed in 1988, which inherited the tradition of the 12th Infantry Division "Sassari".
