= Giardino Botanico della Scuola Media Statale "E.Toti" di Musile di Piave =

Botanical garden in Italy

Coordinates: 45°37′N 12°34′E

The Giardino Botanico della Scuola Media Statale "E.Toti" di Musile di Piave (3500 m^{2}) is an arboretum and botanical garden located on the grounds of the middle school "E. Toti", Via Guglielmo Marconi, Musile di Piave, Province of Venice, Veneto, Italy. It is open daily.

The garden was established in 1978-79 as an outdoor classroom for the study of plants.

== Specimens ==
Its collection includes:

- Acacia saligna
- Acer campestre
- Acer pseudoplatanus
- Aesculus hippocastanum
- Albizia julibrissin
- Albizia lophanta
- Araujia sericifera
- Betula alba
- Carpinus betulus
- Catalpa bignonioides
- Cedrus atlantica
- Celtis australis
- Ceratonia siliqua
- Chorisia insignis
- Corylus avellana
- Diospyros kaki
- Eriobotrya japonica
- Erythrina crista-galli
- Feijoa sellowiana
- Gleditschia triacanthos
- Hovenia dulcis
- Juglans regia
- Macfadyena unguis-cati
- Maclura pomifera
- Magnolia grandiflora
- Ostrya carpinifolia
- Passiflora antioquiensis
- Persea americana
- Picea abies
- Pinus pinea
- Populus nigra
- Prunus avium
- Psidium guajava
- Quercus pedunculata
- Salix alba
- Ulmus campestris

== See also ==
- List of botanical gardens in Italy
