= 13th Infantry Division "Re" =

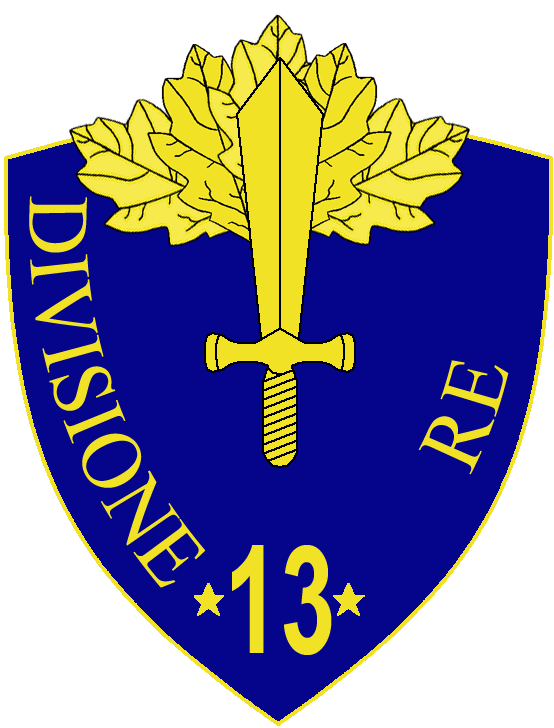
- 13th Infantry Division "Re" insignia
- Active: 1937–1943
- Country: Kingdom of Italy
- Branch: Royal Italian Army
- Type: Infantry
- Size: Division
- Garrison/HQ: Udine
- Engagements: World War II; Battle of the Neretva

Insignia
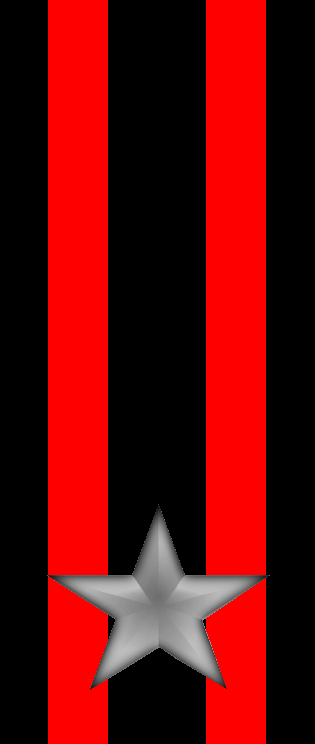
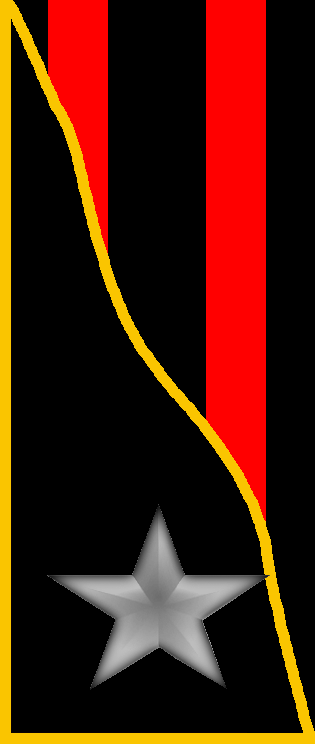
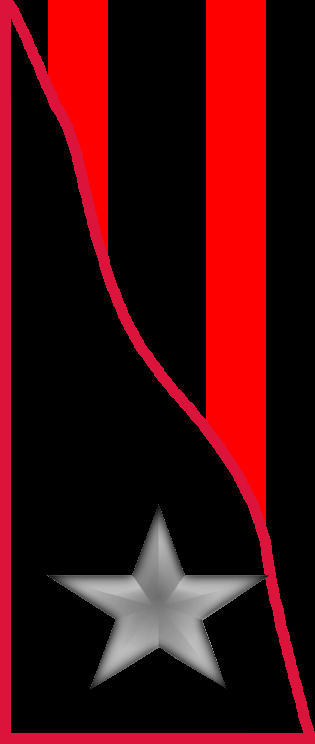
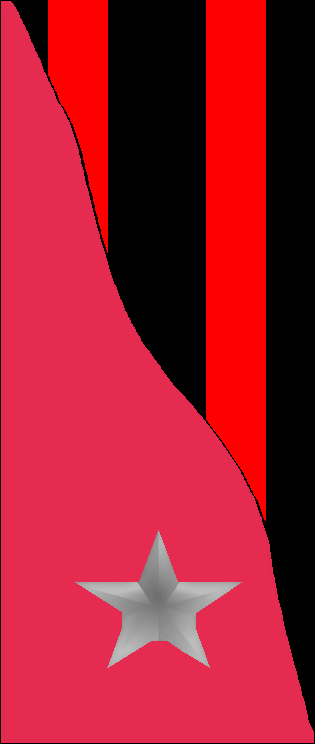
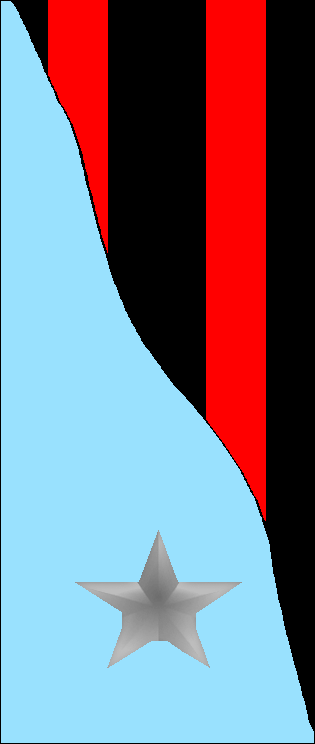
- Identification symbol: Re Division gorget patches

The 13th Infantry Division "Re" (Italian: 13ª Divisione di fanteria "Re") was an infantry division of the Royal Italian Army during World War II. The division was based in Friuli and entitled to the King (Italian: Re).

== History ==
The division's lineage begins with the Brigade "Savoia" established in 1814, which on 25 October 1831 split to form the 1st and 2nd infantry regiments under the brigade's command. When the Second French Empire annexed Savoy on 14 June 1860 after the Second Italian War of Independence the brigade was renamed on the same day as "Brigade of the King" (Italian: Brigata del Re).

=== World War I ===
The brigade fought on the Italian front in World War I. On 23 October 1926 the brigade assumed the name of XIII Infantry Brigade and received the 55th Infantry Regiment "Marche" from the disbanded Brigade "Marche". The brigade was the infantry component of the 13th Territorial Division of Udine, which also included the 15th Artillery Regiment. On 1 January 1928 the XIII Infantry Brigade exchanged the 55th Infantry Regiment "Marche" for the 56th Infantry Regiment "Marche" of the X Infantry Brigade. In 1934 the division changed its name to 13th Infantry Division "Montenero". On 22 February 1939 the division ceded the 56th Infantry Regiment "Marche" to the newly activated 32nd Infantry Division "Marche". On 15 May 1939 the division ceded the 15th Artillery Regiment to the newly activated 38th Infantry Division "Puglie". On the same day the division took its traditional name "Re", dissolved the XIII Infantry Brigade, with the two remaining infantry regiments coming under direct command of the division, and received the 34th Artillery Regiment from the 12th Infantry Division "Timavo".

=== World War II ===
==== Yugoslavia ====
Early in 1940 the division swapped artillery regiments with the 12th Infantry Division "Sassari". On 10 June 1940, the day Italy entered World War II, the Re was deployed along the border with Yugoslavia in the Cerkno – Idrija – Črni Vrh – Most na Soči area. The division remained in Friuli on border patrol duty until the invasion of Yugoslavia on 6 April 1941. On 6 April the Re crossed the border at Stregna. From 6–10 April 1941 the division defeated heavy resistance at Ravnik pri Hotedršici and then captured Ledine and Pečnik. On 11 April the Yugoslavian resistance collapsed and the division was able to capture Žiri and Goropeke. On 14 April 1941 the division entered Ljubljana.

==== Croatia ====
In May 1941 the division was transferred as occupation force to Croatia. Increasingly intensive battles with Yugoslav partisans were fought in November–December 1941 at Štirovača forest, Divoselo, and Žuta Lokva. Fighting occurred initially at Gospić, Otočac and Bihać. The partisans launched a major assault on Korenica and Udbina on 2–15 January 1942. These attacks were defeated by the Re, and in February–March 1942, the division participated in mopping-up operations in the area. Between 23 and 28 March 1942 the division tried to break through partisan lines to relieve the besieged garrisons in Titova Korenica, Udbina and Donji Lapac. The operation was successful and the division suffered only light casualties. Already in April 1942 the partisans went on the offensive again and launched an assault on Mogorić and Bihać. The partisan's strength was such, that he garrison of Bihać had to be evacuated in June 1942. By the end of June all lost positions had been recovered after fierce fighting.

While the Re was on occupation duty in Yugoslavia the division's regimental depots in Italy raised the 159th Infantry Division "Veneto": the depot of the 1st Infantry Regiment "Re" raised the 256th Infantry Regiment "Veneto", the depot of the 2nd Infantry Regiment "Re" raised the 255th Infantry Regiment "Veneto", and the depot of the 23rd Artillery Regiment "Re" raised the 159th Artillery Regiment "Veneto".

In July 1942 the Re was transferred to Slovenia to fight partisans there. Operation Provincia di Lubiana on 12 July – 7 August 1942, was an anti-partisan operation to clear partisans from the mountainous area north west of Delnice. The objective was to destroy the partisan's supply bases and alienate the local population from the partisans. The Re carried out a scorched earth campaign by destroying the local harvest and burning 1,000 homes. They were also involved in the murder of 200 civilians and interning another 2,500 men and women in a concentration camp. In August 1942 the fighting continued near Križpolje and in the Markovac hills near Dubica. In September 1942 further fighting happened in Saborsko near Lička Jesenica, and in Plaški, Dabar, Lešće (near Otočac). In October, 1942, the Re division stormed a major partisan camp at Krš. Further battles were fought between Gračac and Medak to defend the railroad line from Ogulin to Split. In January–March 1943 the division participated in the Battle of the Neretva. In February–March 1943 the focus of the fighting shifted to Jelovi vrh in Lika-Senj County and to Pavlovačka Draga in Bosnia and Herzegovina. Afterwards the intensity of fighting subsided and the Re was ordered to return to Italy on 28 August 1943.

==== Rome ====
When the Armistice of Cassibile was announced on 8 September 1943 the division's command had arrived with the following units in Monterotondo near Rome:

- I Battalion/ 1st Infantry Regiment "Re"
- III Battalion/ 1st Infantry Regiment "Re"
- III Battalion/ 2nd Infantry Regiment "Re"
- I Group/ 23rd Artillery Regiment "Re"

The rest of the division was still at Florence and Trieste. The 12th Infantry Division "Sassari" detached its II Group/ 34th Artillery Regiment "Sassari" and XII Self-propelled Anti-tank Battalion to the Re, which participated in the defense of Rome against the invading Germans. On 10 September the defenders of Rome surrendered and the Re was dissolved by the Germans on 12 September 1943.

== Organization ==
13th Infantry Division "Re" organization in 1940

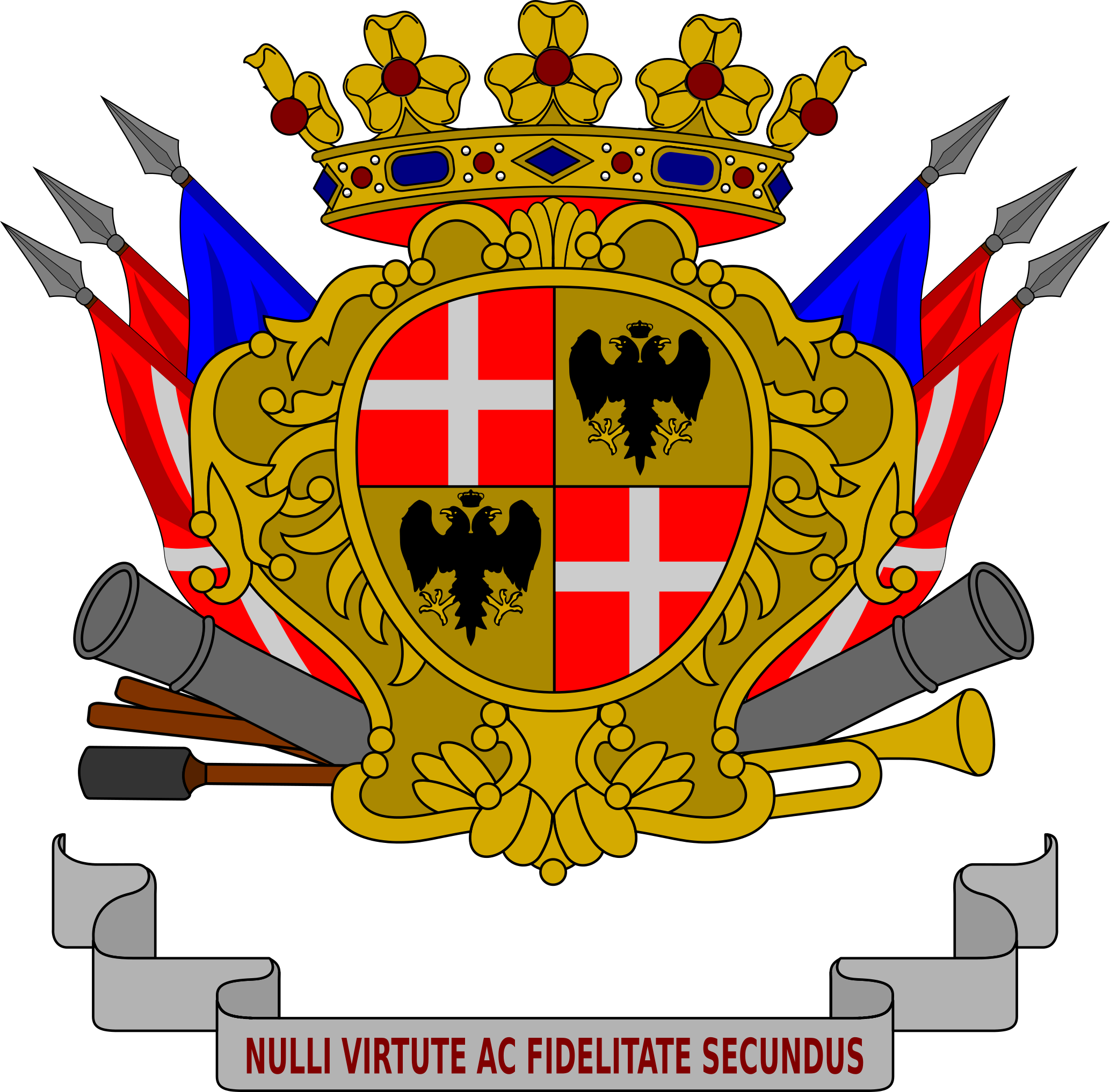
Coat of Arms of the 2nd Infantry Regiment "Re", 1939

- 13th Infantry Division "Re", in Udine
  - Headquarters
    - Command Company
    - 34th Carabinieri Section
    - 35th Carabinieri Section
    - 93rd Field Post Office
    - 13th Infantry Division Command Transport Squad
  - 1st Infantry Regiment "Re", in Tolmin
    - Command Company
    - 3 × Fusilier battalions
    - Support Weapons Battery (65/17 mod. 13 infantry support guns)
    - Mortar Company (81mm mod. 35 mortars)
  - 2nd Infantry Regiment "Re", in Udine
    - Command Company
    - 3 × Fusilier battalions
    - Support Weapons Battery (65/17 mod. 13 infantry support guns)
    - Mortar Company (81mm mod. 35 mortars)
  - 23rd Artillery Regiment "Re", in Udine
    - Command Unit
    - I Group (75/27 mod. 11 field guns)
    - II Group (75/13 mod. 15 mountain guns; transferred in July 1940 to the 32nd Artillery Regiment "Marche")
    - II Group (75/27 mod. 11 field guns; transferred in July 1940 from the 32nd Artillery Regiment "Marche")
    - III Group (75/13 mod. 15 mountain guns)
    - 1 × Anti-aircraft battery (20/65 mod. 35 anti-aircraft guns)
    - Ammunition and Supply Unit
  - XIII Mortar Battalion (81mm mod. 35 mortars)
  - 13th Anti-tank Company (47/32 mod. 35 anti-tank guns)
  - 38th Engineer Company
  - 13th Telegraph and Radio Operators Company
  - 20th Medical Section
    - 3 × Field hospitals
    - 1 × Surgical Unit
  - 13th Autocarrette Section
  - 28th Supply Section
  - 555th Transport Section

Attached from 16 February 1941:

- 75th CC.NN. Legion "XX Dicembre"
  - Command Company
  - LXXV CC.NN. Battalion
  - LXXVI CC.NN. Battalion
  - 75th CC.NN. Machine Gun Company

== Commanding officers ==
The division's commanding officers were:

- Generale di Divisione Benedetto Fiorenzoli (1938 – 30 December 1940)
- Colonel Francesco Soddu Millo (acting, 31 December 1940 – 8 January 1941)
- Generale di Divisione Benedetto Fiorenzoli (9 January 1941 – 5 October 1941)
- Colonel Francesco Soddu Millo (acting, 6 October 1941 – 14 November 1941)
- Generale di Brigata Ottorino Battista Dabbeni (15 November 1941 – 28 February 1942)
- Colonel Francesco Soddu Millo (acting, 1 March 1942 – 13 March 1942)
- Generale di Brigata Raffaele Pelligra (14 March 1942 – 12 July 1943)
- Generale di Brigata Ottaviano Traniello (13 July 1943 – 12 September 1943)

== CROWCASS ==
The names of three men attached to the division can be found in the Central Registry of War Criminals and Security Suspects (CROWCASS) set up by the Anglo-American Supreme Headquarters Allied Expeditionary Force in 1945. The names can be found at: Central Registry of War Criminals and Security Suspects from the Kingdom of Italy.
