= Novi Lazi, Slovenia =

Novi Lazi
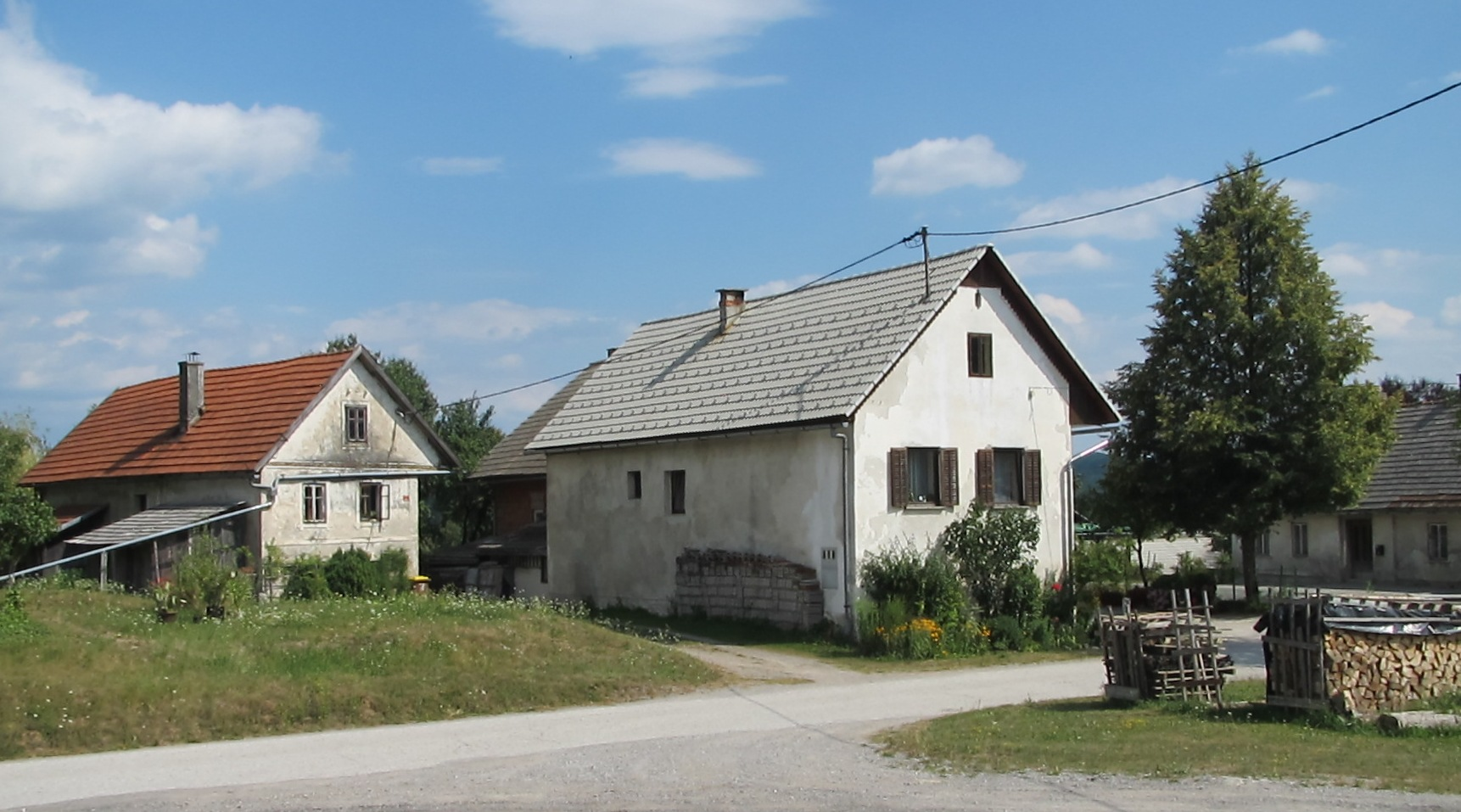
- Novi Lazi

- Location in Slovenia
- Coordinates: 45°34′18.7″N 14°50′56.12″E
- Country: Slovenia
- Traditional region: Lower Carniola
- Statistical region: Southeast Slovenia
- Municipality: Kočevje

Area
  - Total: 12.26 km^{2} (4.73 sq mi)
- Elevation: 545.7 m (1,790 ft)

Population (2002)
  - Total: 107
- Postal code: 1338

Novi Lazi (pronounced [ˈnɔːʋi ˈlaːzi]; German: Hinterberg, Gottscheerish: Hintrparg)is a settlement east of Kočevska Reka in the Municipality of Kočevje in southern Slovenia. The area is part of the traditional region of Lower Carniola and is now included in the Southeast Slovenia Statistical Region. After the Second World War it also included Jelenja Vas (Slovene: Jelenja vas), formerly a separate village named Iskrba (German: Hirisgruben), which is now a hamlet of Štalcerji.

== History ==
Novi Lazi was a village settled by Gottschee Germans. In the land register of 1498 Novi Lazi is listed as having 18 half-farms and one full farm. In the land register of 1574 all of the properties were half-farms and there were also four tenant farmers that were required to perform corvée four days a year. The farmers had to perform corvée two days a year for Friedrichstein Castle (Slovene: Fridrihštajn). At that time the population is estimated to have been between 100 and 110. In 1770 the village had 40 houses. Before the Second World War there were 63 houses in the village, with a population of 223. Its original population was evicted in November 1941, after which many houses remained empty and began to deteriorate.

== Name ==
The name Novi Lazi literally means 'new clearings', from the common noun laz 'cleared area in or next to a forest overgrown with grass'. Many related toponyms have become feminine plural nouns (e.g., Laze, Zgornje Laže, etc.), but it has retained its original masculine gender, like some other toponyms (e.g., Dolenji Lazi). The standard German name Hinterberg and Gottscheerish name Hintrparg mean 'behind the mountain/hill', thus referring to the local topography.

== Church ==
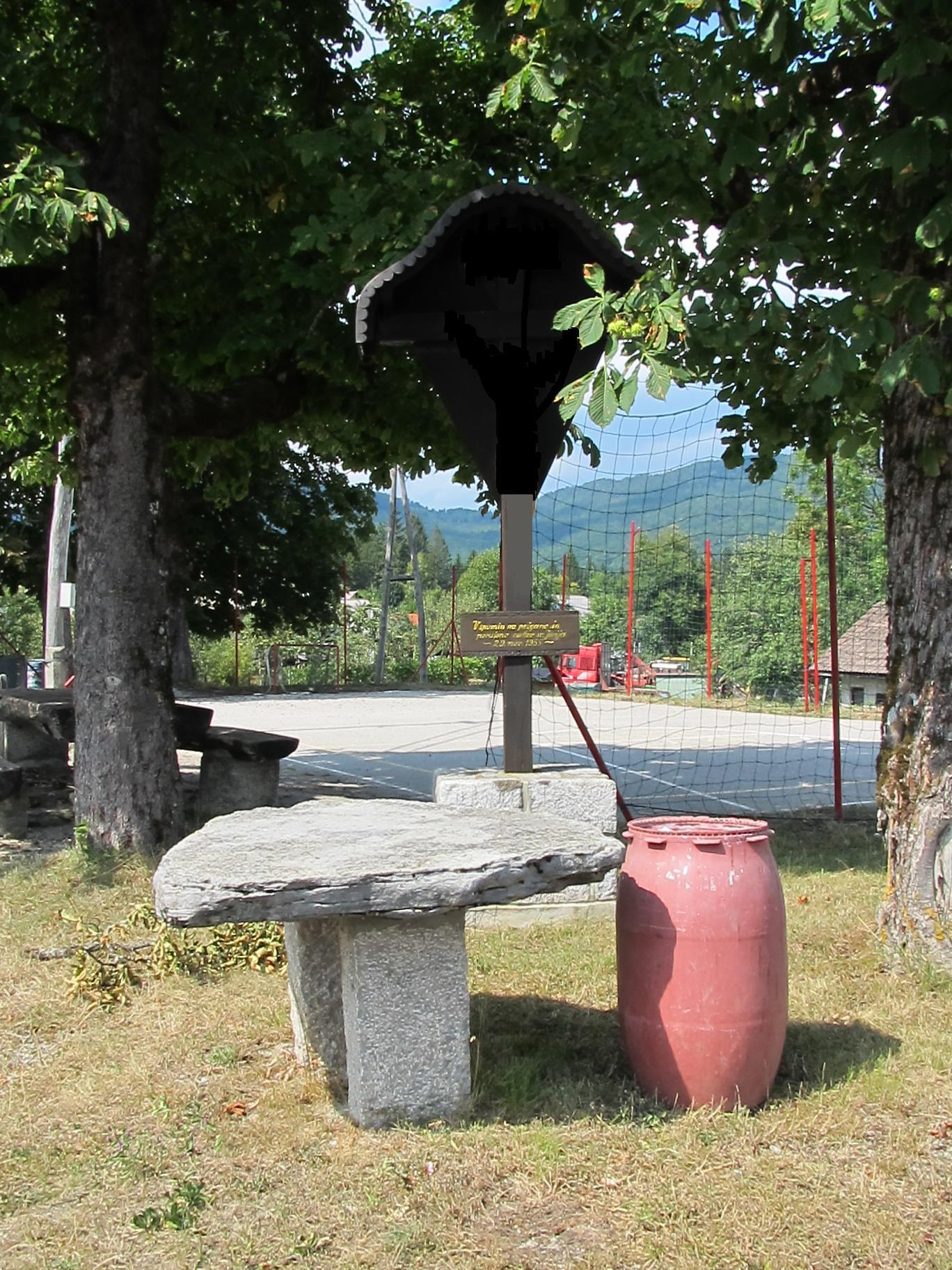
Former site of St. George's Church

The local church, dedicated to Saint George, was first mentioned in written documents dating to 1526. It was demolished on 29 November 1955. A cross commemorating the church stands at the site with a plaque inscribed "In memory of the burned and demolished Saint George's Church, 29 November 1955" (V spomin na požgano in porušeno cerkev sv. Jurija – 29. nov. 1955).

== Other cultural heritage ==
In addition to the site of the former church, the abandoned cemetery in Novi Lazi is also registered as cultural heritage. The cemetery lies southwest of the settlement where the road through the village rejoins the main road from Kočevje to Brod na Kupi, Croatia. The cemetery was established in 1824 on the edge of the village and contains only a few Gottschee German and Slovene gravestones from the 19th and 20th centuries. Some of the gravestones have been professionally restored.

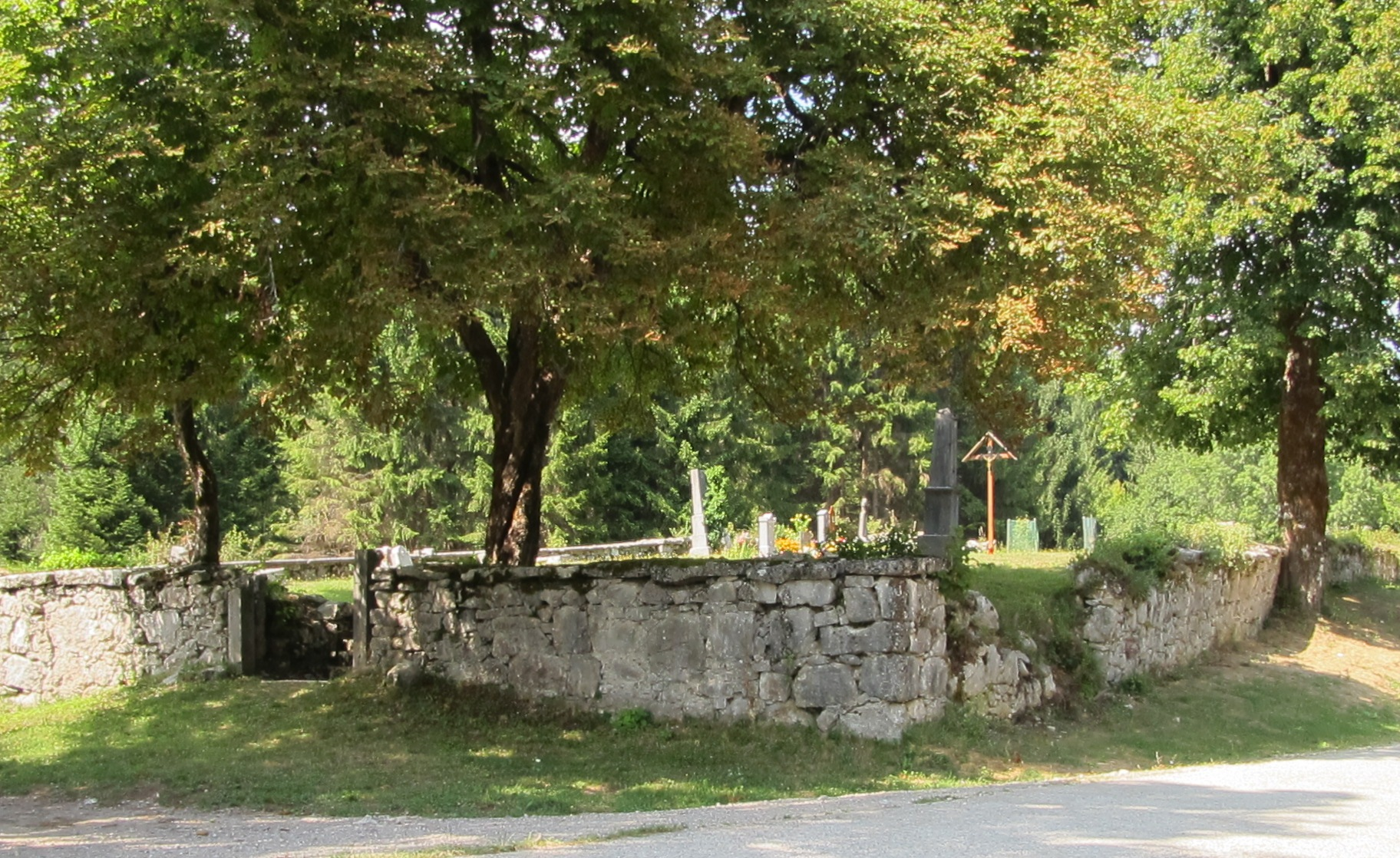
Novi Lazi cemetery

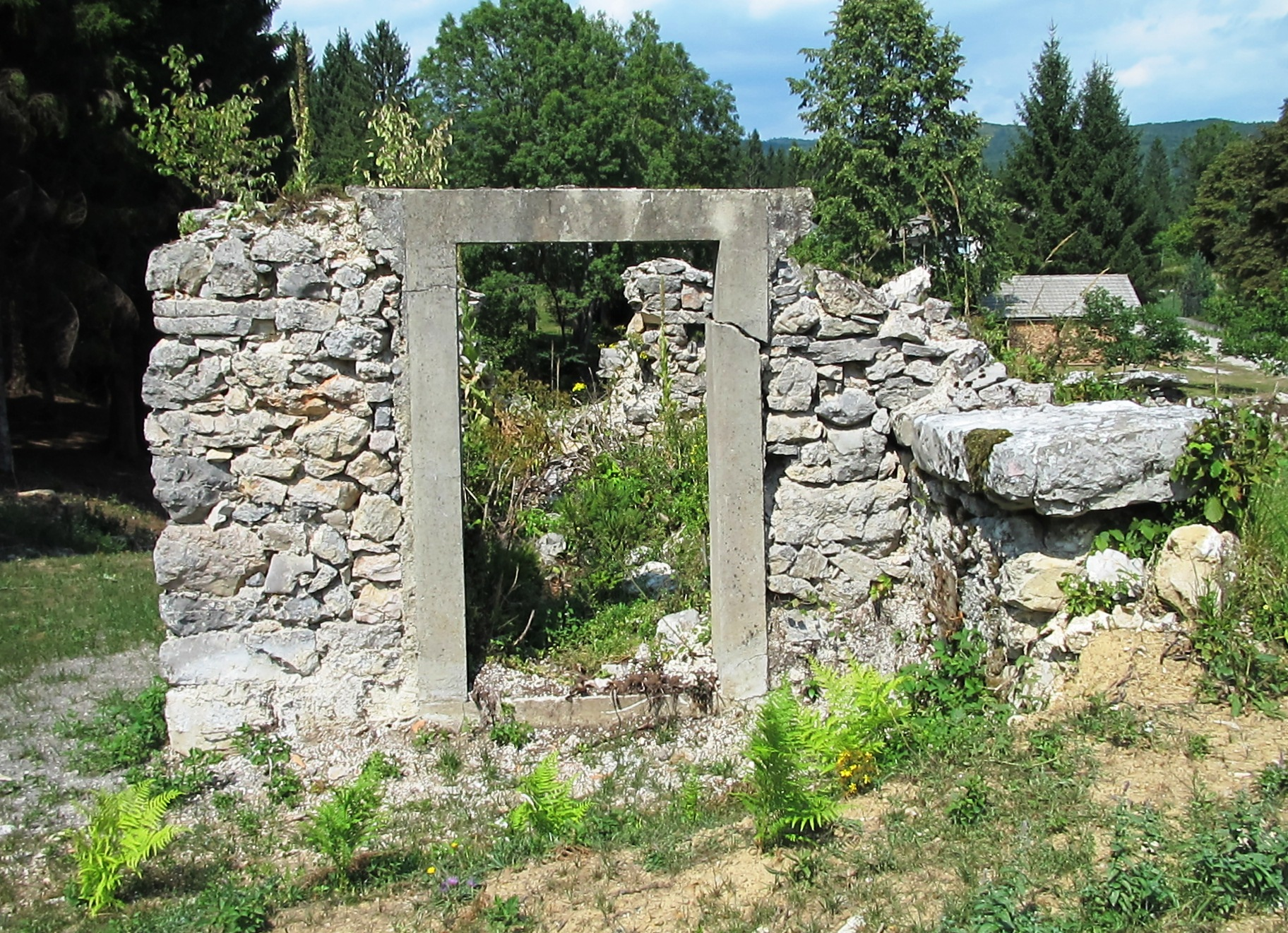
Cemetery chapel ruins

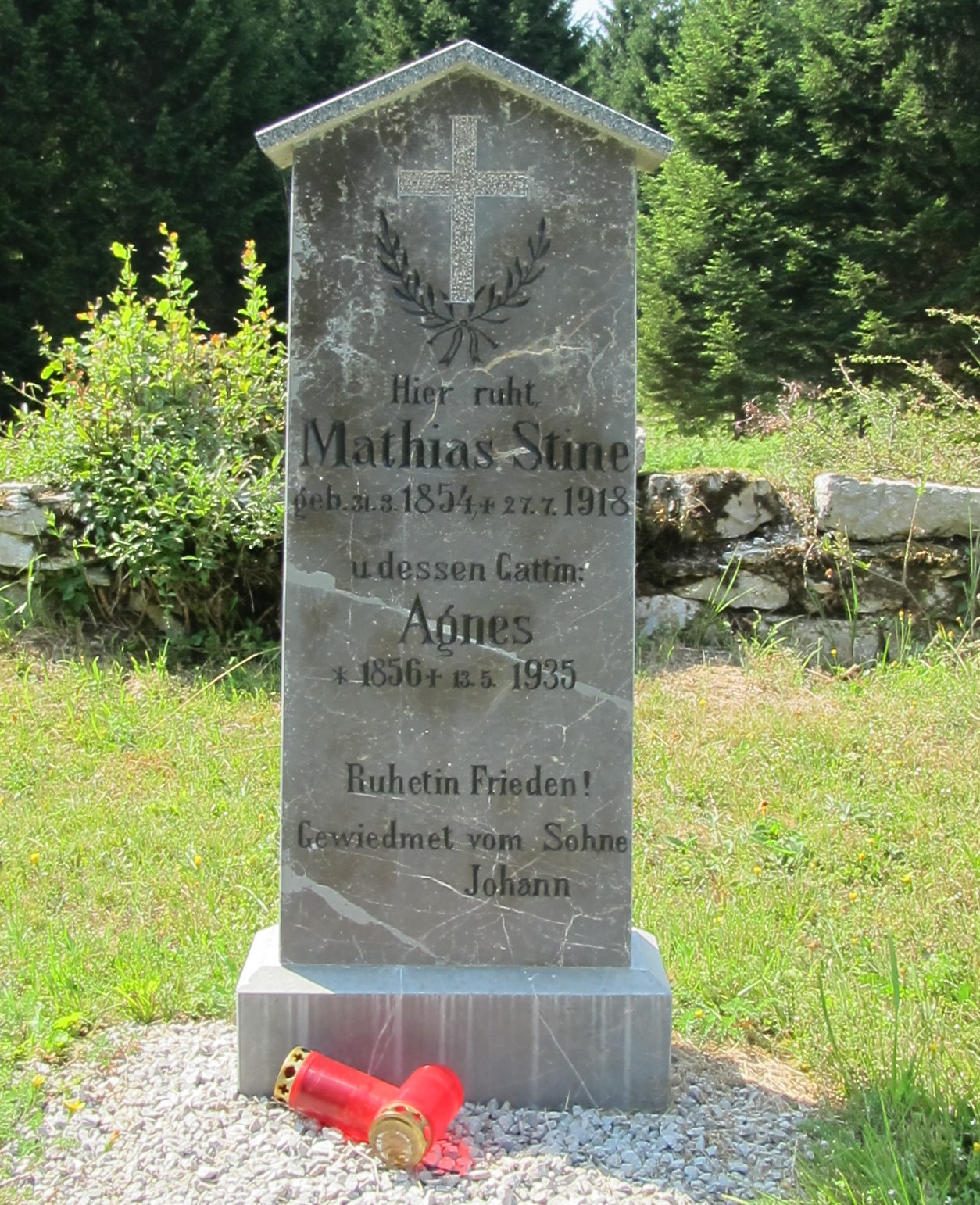
German gravestone
