= Santa Lucia di Piave =

- Comune
- Comune di Santa Lucia di Piave
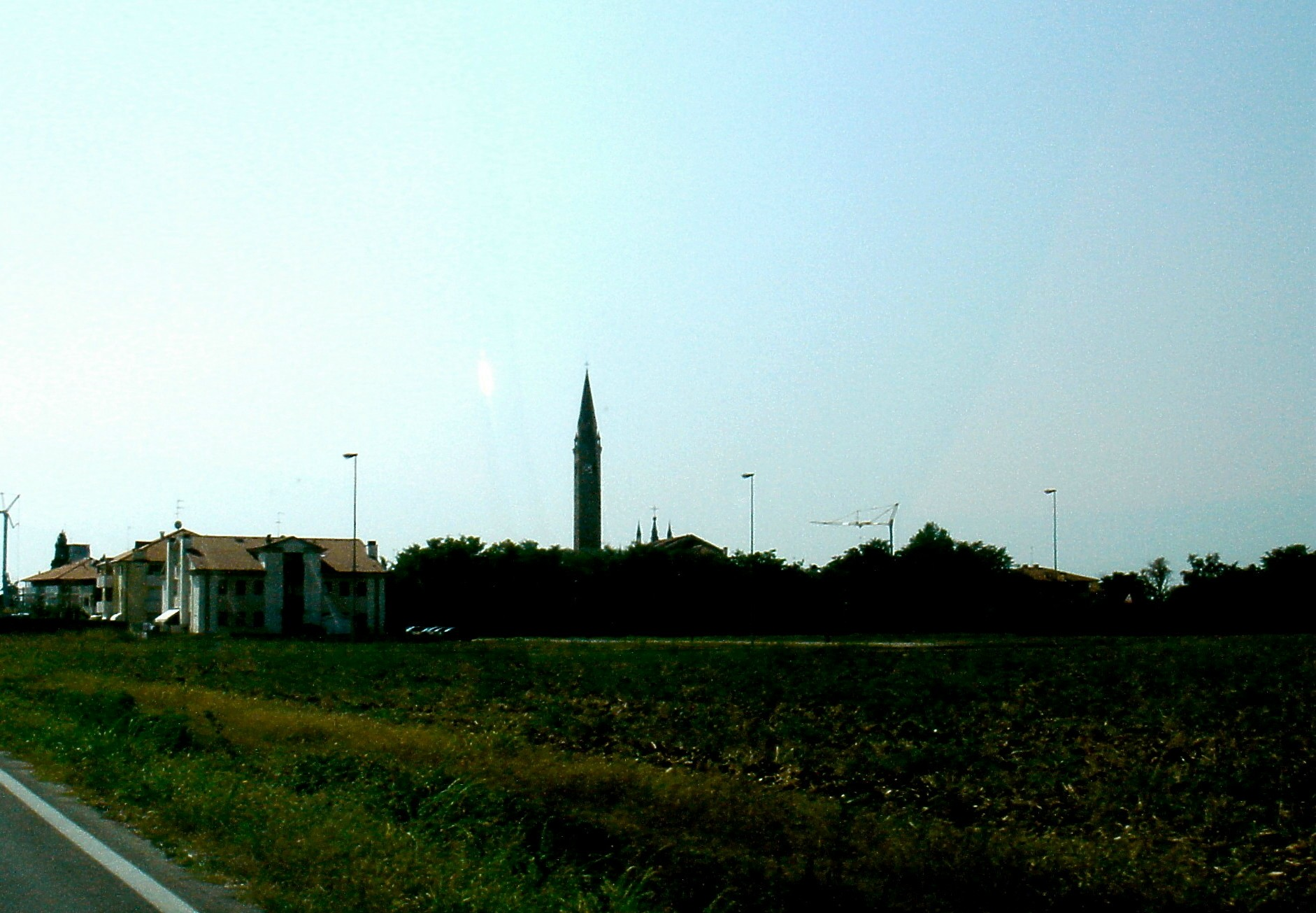

- Location within Italy Location within Veneto
- Coordinates: 45°51′N 12°17′E
- Country: Italy
- Region: Veneto
- Province: Treviso (TV)

Government
  - Mayor: Riccardo Szumsky

Area
  - Total: 19 km^{2} (7.3 sq mi)
- Elevation: 62 m (203 ft)

Population (31 December 2015)
  - Total: 9,151
  - Density: 480/km^{2} (1,200/sq mi)
- Demonym: Santalucesi
- Time zone: UTC+1 (CET)
  - Summer (DST): UTC+2 (CEST)
- Postal code: 31025
- Dialing code: 0438
- Patron saint: St. Lucy
- Saint day: 13 December
- Website: Official website

Santa Lucia di Piave is a comune in the province of Treviso, Veneto, north-eastern Italy.
