= Musile di Piave =

Musile di Piave Muxil (Venetian)
- Comune
- Comune di Musile di Piave
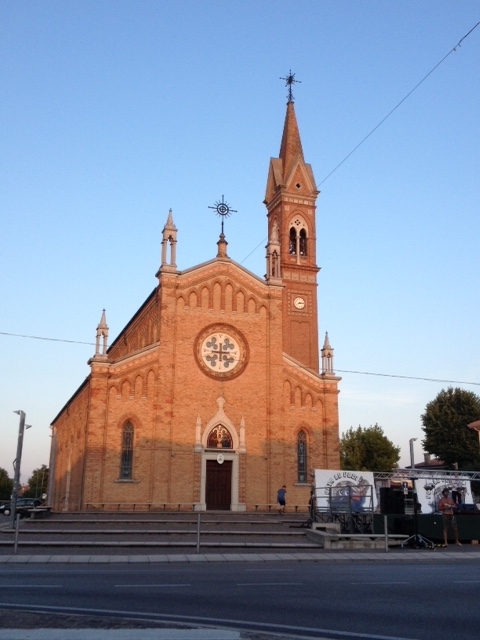
- Parish church of San Donato.

- Location within Italy Location within Veneto
- Coordinates: 45°37′N 12°34′E
- Country: Italy
- Region: Veneto
- Metropolitan city: Venice (VE)
- Frazioni: Caposile, Croce, Millepertiche

Government
  - Mayor: Silvia Susanna

Area
  - Total: 44.87 km^{2} (17.32 sq mi)
- Elevation: 2 m (6.6 ft)

Population (30 November 2017)
  - Total: 11,473
  - Density: 255.7/km^{2} (662.2/sq mi)
- Demonym: Musilensi
- Time zone: UTC+1 (CET)
  - Summer (DST): UTC+2 (CEST)
- Postal code: 30024
- Dialing code: 0421
- Website: Official website

Musile di Piave (Italian: [muˈziːle di ˈpjaːve]; Venetian: Muxil [muˈzil]) is a town and comune in the Metropolitan City of Venice, Veneto, northern Italy.

The Piave River flows through the town, which was relevant during World War I due to the river's strategic importance. In 1918 it was occupied by the Austrians.

== Main sights ==
- Giardino Botanico della Scuola Media Statale "E.Toti" di Musile di Piave, an arboretum and botanical garden
