= Monte Zebio =

Mountain in Italy

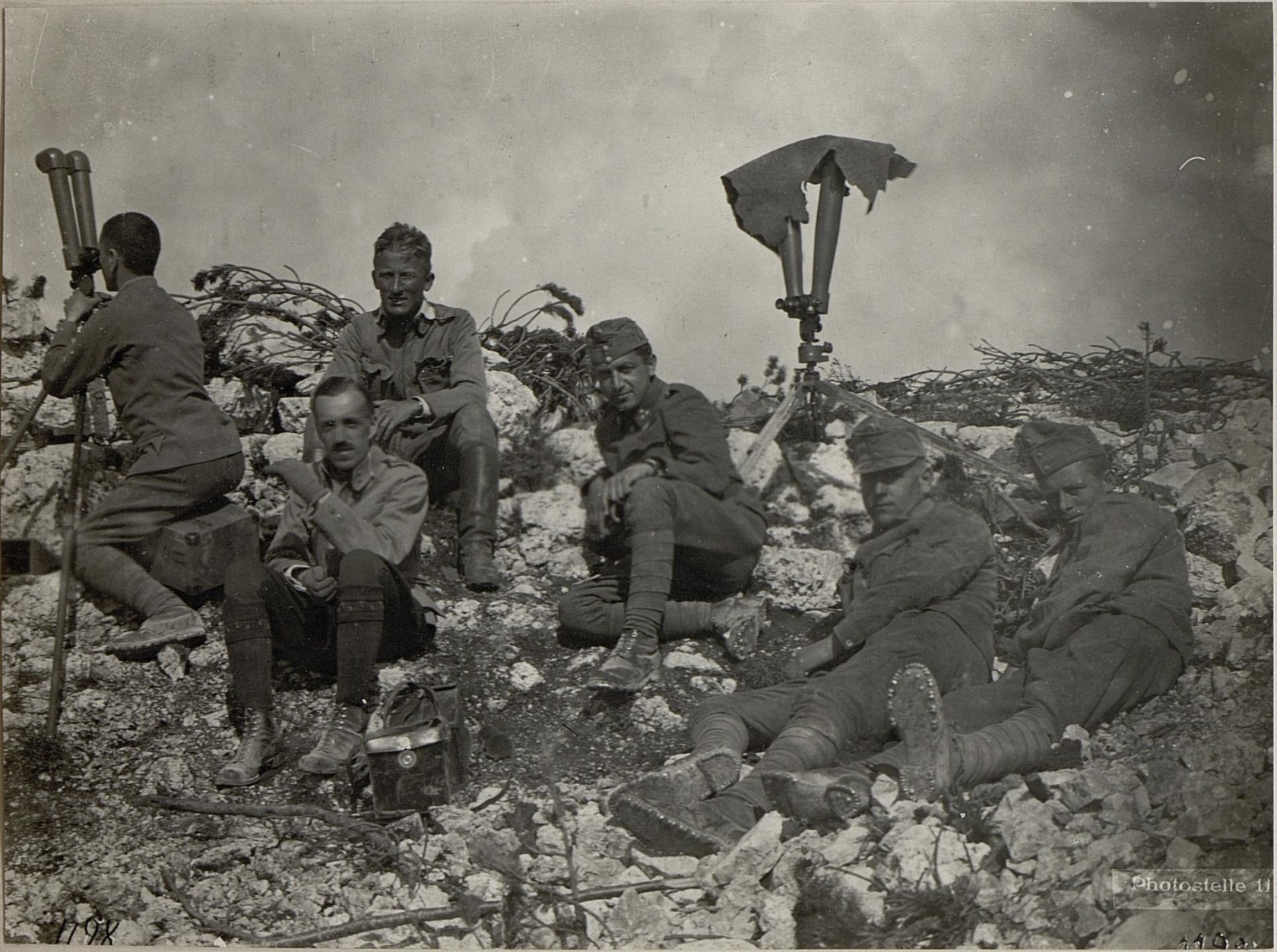
- Workers at the Monte Zebio Observation stand

Highest point
- Elevation: 1,819 m (5,968 ft)
- Coordinates: 45°55′34″N 11°30′31″E

Geography
- Location: Veneto, Italy
- Parent range: Alps

Monte Zebio (Italian pronunciation: [ˈmonte dˈdzeːbjo]) is a mountain of the Veneto, Italy. It has an elevation of 1,819 metres (5,968 ft). The mountain was an important stronghold for the Austro-Hungarian defensive line during World War I.
