= One Year on the High Plateau =

1938 novel by Emilio Lussu

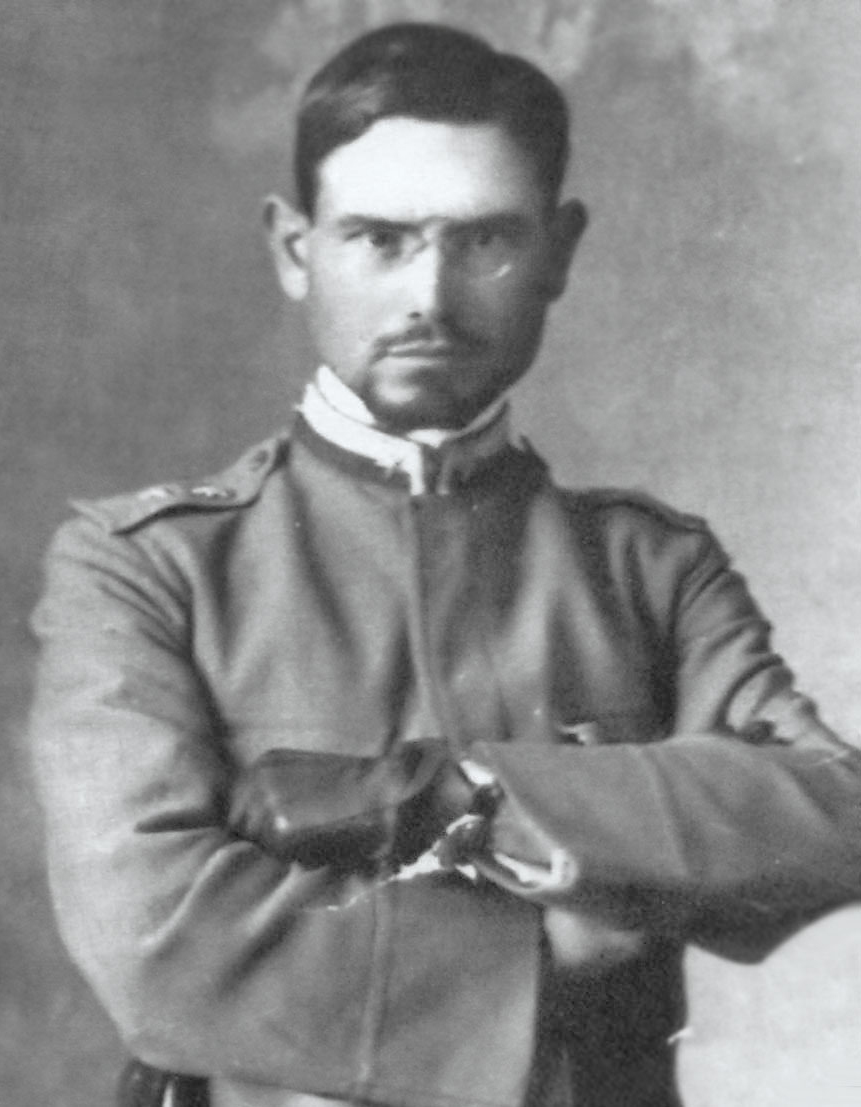
- Emilio Lussu as a lieutenant of the Sassari Brigade during Great War
- Author: Emilio Lussu
- Original title: Un anno sull'Altipiano
- Language: Italian
- Genre: War novel
- Publisher: Einaudi (Italy)
- Publication place: Italy
- Media type: Print (paperback)

One Year on the High Plateau (original title: Un anno sull'Altipiano) is a historical novel by Emilio Lussu: set on the Asiago plateau. It is one of the major works of Italian literature on the First World War. The novel was written in 1936 and 1937 and tells, for the first time in Italian literature, the irrationality and senselessness of war, hierarchy and exasperated military discipline in use at the time. For a long time considered a faithful chronicle of the events dating back to the period spent by Lussu as an officer of the Sassari Brigade, it has subsequently been the subject of a substantial historiographic criticism, which has strongly reduced the value of the chronicle of real events, leading it to the role of historical novel.

== Origins ==
Before the outbreak of the Great War, Emilio Lussu was a university student and was an active interventionist in the period preceding the declaration of hostilities. He enlisted as a volunteer together with Giuseppe Tommasi, and with the latter was destined to serve as a second lieutenant in the Sassari Brigade, a unit composed almost exclusively of Sardinians. In the ranks of this unit, Lussu earned the appreciation of his superiors and received four decorations for valor in recognition of the actions he carried out and of the influence exercised over the men under his command during the conflict

After the war, Lussu founded with Camillo Bellieni the Partito Sardo d'Azione, opposing the progressive takeover of power by the fascists. Having failed an attempt at negotiation and convergence between the shareholders and the Fascists, of which he himself was a protagonist, Lussu sided with increasingly antagonistic positions, participating in the Aventine Secession after the assassination of Giacomo Matteotti. The firm hostility towards Fascism led him, when all opposition parties were suppressed, to be sentenced to five years in prison to be served on the island of Lipari.

Escaped from captivity, he repaired abroad, later joining Giustizia e Libertà. In the years of exile he developed a different consciousness towards his military experience and in general on the value of the Great War, connecting it with the advent of Fascism. In the period of exile he gave body to his reflections writing first March on Rome and its whereabouts (Marcia su Roma e dintorni), and then Un anno sull'Altipiano. This last work, therefore, was written in a context and in conditions of mind very different from those that had characterized the pre-war period and the actions during the conflict. The narration reflects the changed conditions of the author, going to reread in a negative key his entire war experience, and reporting in fictional form both episodes that really happened, and events that are not reflected in historical reality.

== Story ==
Hidden under unit numbers and fictitious names, the novel recounts events that can be traced back to the period spent by the Sassari Brigade on the Altipiano dei Sette Comuni between June 1916 and July 1917. In fact, under the conventional names of the 399th and 400th Infantry Regiments - ordinals not present in the list of the Regiments of the Regio Esercito - are hidden the 151st and 152nd Infantry Regiments of the brigade.

At the end of May 1916 the unit, that was fighting on Carso, was rapidly relocated on the Asiago High Plateau, where the Austro-Hungarian offensive labeled as Strafexpedition was ongoing. After its arrival on the new warfront, the Sassari fought between Monte Fior and Monte Zebio, behaving valiantly and in fact helping to stop the Austro-Hungarian invasion attempt. After spending the winter in the trenches, in June 1917 the Sassari participated in the Battle of Mount Ortigara, attacking on the Mount Zebio. The story ends before the Eleventh Battle of Isonzo and the following Battle of Caporetto.

In Lussu's narrative, the salient aspects of life in the trenches are reported, describing the suffering of men in combat, the atmosphere of fear before an assault and during the bombardment of enemy artillery, the enormous losses to conquer a few meters of land and enemy trenches that were almost regularly lost after a short time.

The criticism towards the superior officers and the generals who were responsible for the conduct of the fighting is undoubtedly fierce, and reflects the accents of bitter antimilitarism that characterized the author at the time of writing the novel. Episodes of careerism and obtuse insensitivity are reported, mixed with the ferocious carnage of war. The most famous of the events narrated is that of the killing by soldiers of a major who had ordered an incongruous decimation of soldiers. In the subsequent trial, the second lieutenant who had taken part in the soldiers' rebellion was in turn shot.

== Characters ==
=== Directly quoted in the text ===
- General Leone (General Lion). Insensitive and fanatical, feared and hated by men, this character represents in the novel the archetype of the general who is distant from men and ready to send them to massacre without sparing them. This figure is traditionally traced back to General Giacinto Ferrero, despite some historians indicate as a possible candidate also General Carlo Carignani - probably it is inspired to a mix between the two.
- Lieutenant Colonel Michele Carriera (Michele Career). Focused on ascending the hierarchical ladder, aligned with the visions of General Leone, he was wounded in the arm during an action and remained at his post long enough to nominate himself for a silver medal for valor. Probably identifiable in Emanuele Pugliese.
- Major Melchiorri. Recently arrived from Libya and not accustomed to trench warfare, he tries to manage his discomfort between alcohol and blind severity. He is the protagonist of the decimation attempt and then the victim of the shooting of his men. This character was identified as Major Francesco Marchese.
- Captain Fiorelli. This is actually Captain Pasqualino "Lino" Fior. Protagonist both in fiction and in reality of the episode of the killing of Major Melchiorri/Marchese, he presented himself as responsible and was tried. He then died by suicide after the war.
- Lieutenant Ottolenghi. An antagonistic voice in the story, he tried several times to have General Leone killed and to incite his colleagues to rebellion, marching all the way to Rome. Real name Nicola Ottaviani.
- Lieutenant Grisoni. Cavalry officer attached to the Sassari, continues to maintain his knightly insignia. Always in a good mood, constantly with his pipe in his mouth, he is the protagonist of a series of episodes between the light-hearted and the valiant. Alfredo Graziani is recognizable in this figure.
- Lieutenant Avellini. Enthusiastic voice of history. A career officer with aspirations towards the General Staff, a friend of Lussu, he was seriously wounded during the fighting on June 10, 1917, on Mount Zebio and died in a field hospital. On his deathbed he receives from Lussu the news of the promotion to captain for war merit and the concession of the silver medal, which he receives with tired indifference. Before dying, he entrusts Lussu with a package of love letters to give back to his fiancée.
- Uncle Francesco. The oldest soldier in Lussu's company, veteran of Libya, a family man, with his thoughts often on home and a cynical and disenchanted eye on the war - he will fall on the battlefield.
- Giuseppe Marrasi. A simple soldier who tries to escape the fighting by making several attempts to desert towards the Austrian trenches. The last one is fatal to him, as the Italian line opens fire on him and kills him.

=== Indirectly quoted in the text ===
- Gabriele Berardi. First commander of the Brigade in combat, he was seriously wounded by a shell burst and expired at the field hospital of Villesse, earning the gold medal for valor. He is quoted anonymously in the first pages of the novel, referring to the fact that Lieutenant Grisoni/Graziani was his attendant officer.
- Stanislao Mammucari. Commander of the 151st Infantry Regiment - in book fiction, the 399th - the unit in which Lussu served. He is mentioned several times in the body of the text as "the colonel".
- Armando Tallarigo He is the general commander of the Sassari, who appears in the story while, in the shelter of a cave, he tries in vain to communicate by radio with his superiors during the bombardment of Mount Zebio and has a brief but intense conversation with Lussu.

== Historical critique ==
The fact that even eighty years after its publication Un anno sull'Altipiano continues to be regularly reprinted is an indication of the book's narrative value. Although it has long been neglected by both academic and militant critics, there are recent readings that highlight the literary quality of this and other Lussu works (such as Marcia su Roma and its whereabouts), and argue that the pages of this memoir-romance anticipate techniques and ideas of later twentieth-century literature.

The work has long been considered a faithful and documentary narration of Captain Lussu's wartime experiences. He himself, however, in the incipit of the book clearly writes that the content of the volume consists only of the episodes that have most affected him during the period described, without any claim to historicity.

At the turn of the 20th and 21st centuries, however, historiographic criticism has reinterpreted the events narrated by Lussu, looking for evidence of the events in the diaries of the Sassari Brigade kept in the archives of the Army General Staff and cross-referencing them with the memoiristic sources produced in particular by Leonardo Motzo, Giuseppe Tommasi and Sardus Fontana. The first to formulate this criticism were the historians Paolo Pozzato and Giovanni Nicolli, who consulted all the existing documentation on the Sassari Brigade during the period in which Lussu was a member, highlighting a series of inconsistencies. Their theses have been independently taken up and integrated by Ferdinando Scala and Lorenzo Cadeddu, which have respectively narrated in a complete way the events of the Sassari Brigade in the period of interest and studied the episode of the shooting of Major Marchese. In particular, it was pointed out that all the defendants in the trial for the death of the officer were acquitted with full formula.

== Derived works ==
The book inspired Francesco Rosi to realize the movie Many Wars Ago, with Gian Maria Volonté.

== Editions ==
- Emilio Lussu, Un anno sull'altipiano, Parigi, Le lettere italiane, 1938
- Emilio Lussu, Un anno sull'altipiano, Torino, Einaudi, 1945
- Emilio Lussu, Un anno sull'altipiano, Torino, Einaudi, 1960
- Emilio Lussu, Un anno sull'altipiano, audiolibro 64 voci, Roma, Emons & Mab Teatro & Fondazione di Sardegna, Italia, 2016 Regia Daniele Monachella
- Emilio Lussu, Un anno sull'altipiano, audiolibro legge Marco Paolini, RAI Radio 3, Italia, https://www.raiplayradio.it/playlist/2017/12/Un-anno-sullaltipiano-535a3e04-9d24-40c1-b4ea-76cec4178a45.html 2017

== See also ==
- Many Wars Ago
- A Farewell to Arms
- All Quiet on the Western Front
- Melette
- Monte Fior
- Monte Zebio
- Battaglie dei Tre Monti
- Paths of Glory
- Wikiquote contains quotes from Un anno sull'Altipiano
