= XVI Army Corps (Italy) =

The XVI Army Corps (Italian: XVI Corpo d'Armata) was a corps of the Royal Italian Army between 1916 and 1943.

== History ==
During World War I, Italy had sent a force to Albania in December 1914, even before it had joined the allies. This force was called Corpo di Occupazione di Valona and renamed Corpo Speciale d’Albania in December 1915. After it helped to evacuate the retreating Serbian Army, it also left Albania in March 1916.
On 20 March 1916, the Corpo Speciale d’Albania was renamed XVI Army Corps, and sent to Albania again in May 1916, where it fought against the Central powers until the end of the war. It was disbanded on 31 August 1919.

A new XVI Army Corps was created in Milan on 1 March 1940. On 1 October 1941, the Corps was moved to Sicily.
The Corps was composed of :

- 4th Infantry Division "Livorno"
- 54th Infantry Division "Napoli"
- 206th Coastal Division
- 213th Coastal Division
- XVIII Coastal Brigade
- XIX Coastal Brigade

Together with the XII Army Corps, the XVI Corps was engaged in intense fighting during the Allied invasion of Sicily (9 July – 17 August 1943) and suffered heavy casualties.
The remnants of the Corps were withdrawn to La Spezia where they surrendered to the Germans on 9 September 1943.

== Commanders ==
- Emilio Bertotti (20 November 1915 – 8 March 1916)
- Settimio Piacentini (8 March – 17 June 1916)
- Oreste Bandini (18 June – 11 December 1916), was killed in the sinking of the Regina Margherita
- Giacinto Ferrero (11 December 1916 - 31 August 1919)
- Antero Canale (1 March 1940 – 31 July 1941)
- Carlo Rossi (31 July 1941 – 9 September 1943)
