= Lussu (surname) =

Lussu is a surname. Notable people with the surname include:

- Emilio Lussu (1890–1975), Italian soldier, politician, antifascist, and writer
- Joyce Lussu (1912–1998), Italian writer, translator, and partisan
