= Italian campaign in Albania =

Italian campaign in Albania may refer to:

- Italian campaign in Albania (World War I)
- Italian invasion of Albania (1939)
