= Armando Tallarigo =

Italian soldier and politician

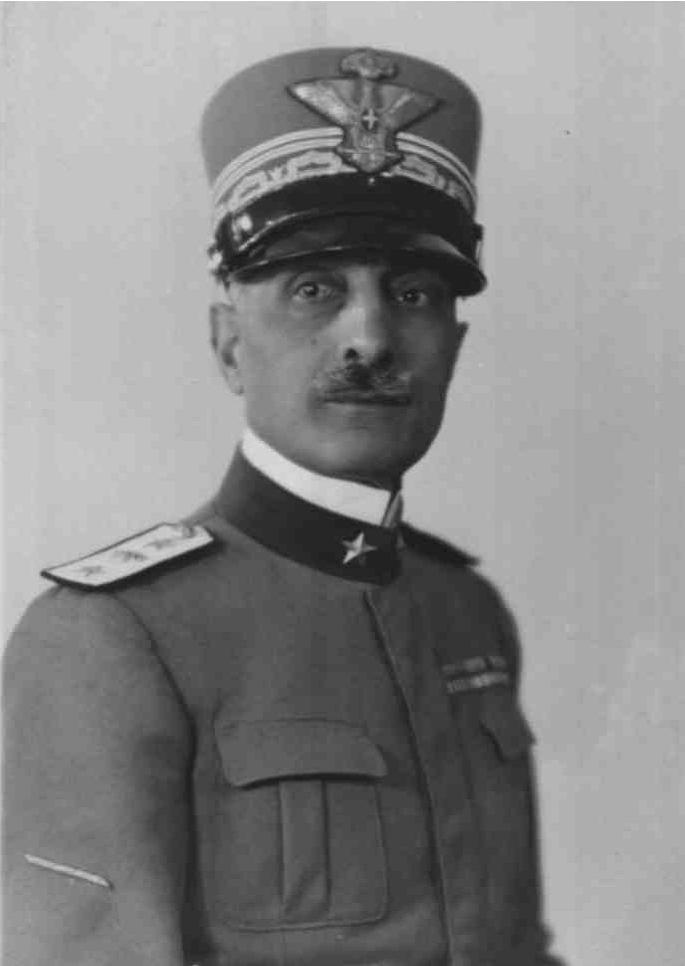
- Portrait of the Italian politician Armando Tallarigo
- Born: 14 August 1864; Catanzaro, Kingdom of Italy
- Died: 22 April 1952 (aged 87); Rome, Italy
- Military career
- Allegiance: Kingdom of Italy
- Branch: Royal Italian Army
- Service years: 1878–1930
- Rank: Generale di corpo d'armata
- Commands: Sassari Brigade; War School
- Conflicts: Italo-Turkish War; First World War
- Awards: see below

Armando Tallarigo

Personal details
- Education: Nunziatella Military School
- Profession: General

Armando Tallarigo, Baron of Zagarise and Sersale (14 August 1864 in Catanzaro – 22 April 1952 in Rome) was an Italian soldier and politician.

== Biography ==
The eldest son of Baron Francesco, mayor of Sersale, and Barbara Greco, he belonged to a noble and wealthy family from the small town in the Presila district of Catanzaro. His paternal ancestors included the archpriest Francesco Maria, who had courageously saved Sersale from destruction during the Napoleonic period, while on his mother's side Antonio Greco had been one of the first and most active Calabrian opponents of the Bourbon regime. The family's clear Risorgimento faith was later reflected in the names of Armando Tallarigo's brother and sister, Garibaldi and Italia.

After probably following his primary studies with monks of the Benedictine Order, he was admitted to the Military College of the Nunziatella in Naples in 1878, where he met his later brotherly friend Alfredo Taranto and graduated first in his course. Admitted to the Artillery academy in 1882, he was second lieutenant in the General Staff two years later and took part in the Libyan campaign, from which he returned with a bronze medal for military valour earned in the Battle of Zanzur. He then took part in the First World War in command of the 152nd Infantry Battalion (Sassari Brigade), where he distinguished himself in the advance at Castel Gomberto and earned a silver medal for being wounded at Casara Zebio. In 1917, promoted to brigadier general, he led the Sassari on the Bainsizza plateau to conquer 865 and 862 peaks. After the war he held command of the military division in Bari and the War School in Turin. Retired in 1930, he was appointed senator for life in 1934 and was removed from office by a sentence of the High Court of Justice for Sanctions against Fascism on 5 December 1944.

== Bibliography ==
- Ferdinando Scala (2018). Il generale Armando Tallarigo - dalla leggenda della Brigata Sassari al dopoguerra. Udine: Gaspari Editore. ISBN 978-8875415976.

== Links ==
- Emilio Lussu
- Giuseppe Musinu
- Un anno sull'Altipiano
- Uomini contro

== Medals ==
=== Civilian ===
Cavaliere dell'Ordine della Corona d'Italia - ribbon for ordinary uniform

Cavaliere dell'Ordine della Corona d'Italia

Commendatore dell'Ordine della Corona d'Italia - ribbon for ordinary uniform

Commendatore dell'Ordine della Corona d'Italia

Grande Ufficiale dell'Ordine della Corona d'Italia - ribbon for ordinary uniform

Grande Ufficiale dell'Ordine della Corona d'Italia

Cavaliere dell'Ordine di San Maurizio e Lazzaro - ribbon for ordinary uniform

Cavaliere dell'Ordine di San Maurizio e Lazzaro

Ufficiale dell'Ordine di San Maurizio e Lazzaro - ribbon for ordinary uniform

Ufficiale dell'Ordine di San Maurizio e Lazzaro

Commendatore dell'Ordine di San Maurizio e Lazzaro - ribbon for ordinary uniform

Commendatore dell'Ordine di San Maurizio e Lazzaro

Grande Ufficiale dell'Ordine di San Maurizio e Lazzaro - ribbon for ordinary uniform

Grande Ufficiale dell'Ordine di San Maurizio e Lazzaro

=== Military ===
Medaglia di bronzo al valor militare - ribbon for ordinary uniform

Medaglia di bronzo al valor militare
"Diede prova, come capo di stato maggiore del comando della 3ª divisione speciale, di spiccata attività e capacità, dimostrando calma e fermezza sotto il fuoco."
— Zanzur, 8 giugno 1912
