= Patrick Lundborg =

Writer on pop culture

Patrick Lundborg (1967 – June 7, 2014) was a writer on psychedelic culture and author of the books Psychedelia and The Acid Archives. Lundborg had a Bachelor of Science degree in applied systems science ('datavetenskap' in Swedish) from Stockholm University, with additional studies in classic philosophy and the history of religion. Lundborg was an original member of the Lumber Island Acid Crew, a psychedelic artist collective which formed in Stockholm in the mid-1980s and remains active up to the present time.

== Works ==
=== Essays and monographs ===
With special focus on psychedelic music and culture, Lundborg wrote numerous magazine articles and CD liner notes within the field. Among his earlier works are The Age of Madness (1992), a guide to 1960s garage compilations and 45s, and 13th Floor Elevators–The Complete Reference File (1999, 2002). In recent years, Lundborg's writings have also appeared in magazines such as Ugly Things (US), Shindig! (UK), Flashback (UK), Misty Lane (Italy), Fenris Wolf (Sweden) and The Wire (UK). The Lysergia website that he launched in 2001 and continues to maintain receives 10–15.000 visitors each month. Patrick Lundborg's non-music writings include essays on Ken Kesey and The Merry Pranksters, Terence McKenna, Mel Lyman, The Human Be-In, the heritage from Eleusis in Shakespeare's The Tempest and the Renaissance, Coppola's Apocalypse Now and Alan Watts.

=== The Acid Archives ===
The Acid Archives, Lundborg's first major work, went through four printings in the original 2006 edition. The book documents and reviews 4.000 underground LPs from the US and Canada, 1965–1982, and has been favorably reviewed in leading music magazines such as Mojo and The Wire. In 2010, a Second Edition of The Acid Archives book (ISBN 9197652318) appeared, printed in color and expanded to 400 pages. The book is currently still in print, and now also available as a downloadable digital e-book.

=== Psychedelia ===
In 2012, Lundborg's latest and largest writing project was launched with the publication of Psychedelia - An Ancient Culture, A Modern Way Of Life (Lysergia 25–12, ISBN 9789197652322). Unlike Lundborg's earlier works, the Psychedelia book is expanded to cover a much wider field than music. Psychedelic culture is traced from its beginnings with the hallucinogenic celebrations at Eleusis 2,500 years ago, acknowledging in parallel the ancient shamanic plant drug cultures of South America and Mexico. A permanent alternative spiritual culture of the West is outlined as Lundborg follows the impulse from Eleusis through the Neoplatonism and pantheism of the Middle Ages, the rise of hermeticism and esoteric alchemy during the Renaissance, up to the highly visible psychedelic scenes of the modern world. Certain representative works and artists are selected for detailed analysis, such as William Shakespeare's The Tempest, Francis Coppola's Apocalypse Now, William Blake, Eden Ahbez, the 13th Floor Elevators, the Mel Lyman Family, Terence McKenna, Grateful Dead, Philip K Dick, Father Yod & The Source Family, and several more. Broader cultural developments given close scrutiny include the ayahuasca religions of Amazonia, the rich hallucinogenic culture of the Aztec, the 1960s Haight-Ashbury scene, the 1970s interest in homegrowing psilocybin mushrooms, the Electronic Dance Music scenes of acid house, Goa PsyTrance and Psybient, and several more.

=== Psychedelic philosophy and the purposeless play ===
A psychedelic philosophy drawn from classic Platonism and the modern phenomenology of Husserl and Merleau-Ponty is presented as a foundation for a modern psychedelic lifestyle. Lundborg links the German phenomenologist Eugen Fink's notion of life as 'play' with the 'purposeless play' advocated by John Cage and Alan Watts, thereby expanding the phenomenological stance into an approach to life in general. The higher spiritual world which emerges in the peak states of the psychedelic experience can be seen reflected in the joys and wonders of nature and everyday life. Repeat exposure will cause the development of a hedonistic-pantheistic lifestyle, where like-minded individuals congregate in enclaves or 'tribes' for shared psychedelic celebrations. This double positive of mundane joy and transcendental bliss is found expressed in many key psychedelic works. Lundborg puts this spiritual lifestyle in contrast with the Abrahamic religions that came to dominate the West as Plato's mystic individualism and the psychedelic initiations at Eleusis fell out of favor.

=== Unified Psychedelic Theory ===
The last chapters of Psychedelia examine the need for and difficulties in mapping out the Innerspace of psychedelic experiences, and discusses several ways in which this could be done, along with the presentation of a generalized trip model that outlines the stages and thematic contents of a typical psychedelic journey. A speculative explanatory model for the bizarre, yet frequently recurring visionary experiences available via high-dose tryptamine drugs like DMT, ayahuasca and psilocybin is presented, based on the latest theories in neurophenomenology and bio-evolutionary research. Lundborg's Unified Psychedelic Theory (UPT) ties together the unbiased, phenomenological approach to psychedelic states with anthropologist Michael Winkelman's neuropsychological model of altered consciousness and Paul MacLean's triune brain, and adds a suggestion that several of the more enigmatic aspects of the higher psychedelic states can be explained via residuals of ancient evolutionary responses to genetic matter of a cosmic origin, what is known as panspermia. The UPT hypothesis solves several lingering questions around the recurring contents of the psychedelic experience, the tryptamine spectrum in particular.
