= Many Wars Ago =

1970 anti-war film by Francesco Rosi

- Italian: Uomini contro
- Directed by: Francesco Rosi
- Written by: Francesco Rosi; Raffaele La Capria; Tonino Guerra
- Based on: One Year on the High Plateau by Emilio Lussu
- Produced by: Francesco Rosi; Marina Cicogna
- Starring: Mark Frechette; Alain Cuny; Gian Maria Volonté; Giampiero Albertini; Pier Paolo Capponi; Franco Graziosi
- Cinematography: Pasqualino De Santis
- Edited by: Ruggiero Mastroianni
- Music by: Piero Piccioni
- Production companies: Prima Cinematografica; Jadran Film
- Distributed by: Euro International (Italy); Dubrava Film (Yugoslavia)
- Release dates: 31 August 1970 (Venice); 17 September 1970 (Italy); 13 January 1971 (Yugoslavia)
- Running time: 101 minutes
- Countries: Italy; Yugoslavia
- Language: Italian

Many Wars Ago (Italian: Uomini contro; lit. 'Men Against') is a 1970 anti-war film set on the Alpine Front of the First World War. Directed, produced, and co-written by Francesco Rosi, the film is based on Emilio Lussu's memoir One Year on the High Plateau, recounting his experiences at the Battle of Asiago. The Italian–Yugoslav co-production was filmed in Belgrade and Zagreb, and stars Mark Frechette, Gian Maria Volonté, and Alain Cuny. It premiered at the 31st Venice International Film Festival.

== Plot ==
The film is set on the Alpine Front of World War I, between 1916 and 1917. The conflict has turned into a bloody stalemate. Bogged down in their trenches on a barren highland, the men of an Italian infantry division have been given one objective: retake a commanding height from the Austro-Hungarian forces. Unfortunately, the tactical ingenuity of General Leone, the unpopular division commander, consists of supplementing frontal attacks against machine guns with medieval fighting schemes. His dispirited troops must be prodded with ever-harsher measures into storming the Austrian positions.

As casualties mount, indignation spreads among the rank and file. In one attack, a beloved junior officer is killed during an attempted mutiny, and subsequently every tenth man of his battalion is chosen to be executed by a firing squad of his comrades in compensation for the killed officer. Disturbed by his superiors' decisions, the young Lieutenant Sassu is progressively led to question the purpose of war and reconsider where his real duties lie.

== Cast ==
- Mark Frechette as Lieutenant Sassu
- Alain Cuny as General Leone
- Gian Maria Volonté as Lieutenant Ottolenghi
- Giampiero Albertini as Captain Abbati
- Pier Paolo Capponi as Lieutenant Santini
- Franco Graziosi as Major Malchiodi
- Mario Feliciani as a medical officer
- Alberto Mastino as Private Marrasi
- Bruno Pischiutta as Private Iacovetta
- Brunetto Del Vita as Colonel Stringari
- Nino Vingelli as a wounded private
- Daria Nicolodi as Red Cross Nurse
- Zdravko Smojver as Sergeant Manganiello
- Antonio Pavan as Lieutenant Pavan
- Luigi Pignatelli as Sub-Lieutenant Avellini

== Production ==
Many Wars Ago was one of three films that American hippie-turned-actor Mark Frechette appeared in. He had been cast by Michelangelo Antonioni in the lead role of Zabriskie Point, who at the time was living in active member of Mel Lyman's commune. The film was a commercial failure, but brought 21-year old Frechette to Italian producers. Because he did not speak Italian, he spoke his lines in English, and was redubbed by Giancarlo Giannini. He tithed his entire salary from the film to the commune, and died in prison in 1975 in Massachusetts, two years after a failed armed robbery. The film was also Daria Nicolodi's debut.

=== Filming ===
Principal photography took place in and around Belgrade (in modern-day Serbia) and Zagreb (in modern-day Croatia). The production was based at Belgrade's Centralni Filmski Studio Kosutnjak.

== Reception ==
The film was screened at the 65th Berlin International Film Festival in honor of Francesco Rosi, who had died a few weeks before. Rosi said of the reaction to the film:

I was denounced for insulting the army, but I was acquitted in the preliminary investigation. The film was boycotted, by the explicit admission of those who did it: it was removed from the cinemas where it passed with the excuse that threatening phone calls were arriving. It had the honor of being the subject of General [Giovanni] De Lorenzo's speeches, abundantly reproduced on Italian television, which at that time certainly had no qualms about advertising a film in this way.

In a retrospective review, Dusty Somers wrote, "Many Wars Ago is a film where the fury of war is viscerally felt in scene after scene of pulsing movement and blasting sound. Rosi doesn’t shy away from launching a series of kinetic assaults on the senses, his close-up framing emphasizing chaos over any distinguishable moving parts."
