= Mark Frechette =

American actor (1947-1975)

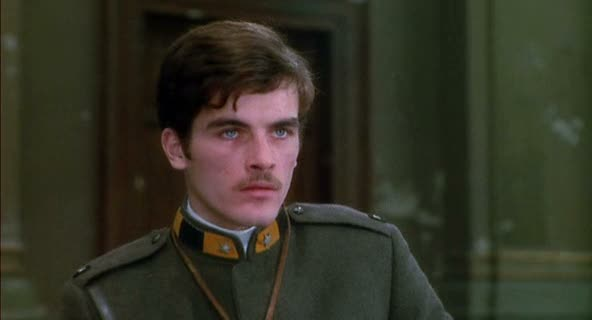
- Frechette in Many Wars Ago (1970)
- Born: Mark Ernest Frechette; December 4, 1947; Boston, Massachusetts, US
- Died: September 27, 1975 (aged 27); Norfolk, Massachusetts, US
- Occupation: Actor

Mark Frechette (December 4, 1947 – September 27, 1975) was an American-Canadian film actor. He is best known for playing the lead role in the 1970 film Zabriskie Point, directed by Michelangelo Antonioni, in which he was cast despite his lack of acting experience. Frechette appeared in two other Italian films. He also became an active member of Mel Lyman's commune. Three years later, Frechette was arrested following an attempted bank robbery and died in prison two years after his arrest.

== Biography ==
Frechette was born to an Irish American mother and a French Canadian father. He had a Catholic upbringing. Frechette attended high school in Fairfield, Connecticut, but dropped out. Starting in 1966, he travelled back and forth between Boston and New York with his former wife and child. He spent some time panhandling and did some carpentry work in Boston. While there, he discovered Mel Lyman's commune, the Fort Hill Community, while reading Avatar. Frechette's first attempts at approaching Lyman were rebuffed.

Frechette was selected from among thousands during a casting process for Zabriskie Point that lasted nearly a year. He was discovered in Boston by Sally Dennison, Antonioni's assistant and casting director, while in the middle of a shouting match turned violent at a Charles Street bus-stop. As Antonioni toured the U.S., experiencing culture clash firsthand and shooting background footage, Dennison saw Frechette, a carpenter, scream and throw a flowerpot at a woman on the street. Another version centered on Frechette's getting into an argument with a person who was on the third floor of an apartment building above him, which is the one referred to in many interviews. "He's twenty and he hates", Dennison told Antonioni. The director immediately cast Frechette, a non-actor, in the film's leading role as an innocent student pursued by the police for the murder of a policeman during a college uprising. Frechette and Antonioni disagreed bitterly about the script during filming.

Despite the film's being a critical and box office bomb, Frechette enjoyed a period of considerable publicity, appearing on the covers of Look in November 1969 and Rolling Stone on March 7, 1970. He appeared on the cover of Sight and Sound, the March 1970 and September 1970 covers of Films and Filming along with several other magazines. He also appeared in the November 1969 issue of Vogue in a fashion shoot. He appeared on The Merv Griffin Show alongside Abbie Hoffman when the latter controversially wore the American flag as a shirt and Frechette got in a fight with another guest, which was later discussed during his appearance on The Dick Cavett Show in April 1970 with his Zabriskie Point co-star Daria Halprin. He and Halprin were romantically involved for a time after the film and were often referred to as the first counter-culture couple. After gaining fame, Frechette became an established member of Lyman's Fort Hill Community. He tried without success to recruit Halprin to join the commune.

Frechette appeared in two other films made in Italy and Yugoslavia, Many Wars Ago (Uomini Contro, 1970) and La Grande Scrofa Nera (1971). He tithed his $60,000 earnings from Zabriskie Point and other films to the Fort Hill Community.

=== 1973 bank robbery ===
On August 29, 1973, he and two members of the Fort Hill community attempted to rob the New England Merchant's Bank in the Fort Hill section of Roxbury, a neighborhood of Boston, Massachusetts. One of the trio, Christopher "Herc" Thein, was killed by police. Frechette and Sheldon T. Bernhard were arrested and pleaded guilty. Frechette was sentenced to a term of six to fifteen years in prison. He was confined in the minimum security state prison in Norfolk, Massachusetts.

The Hungarian-born film director Dezső Magyar gave an interview for the Hungarian Filmkultura magazine in March 1987 in which he said: "[M]y first friend was Mark Frechette, protagonist of the film Zabriskie Point. We wanted to make a film, to adapt a part of Crime and Punishment because we felt that America was like a Dostoevsky-type world. Mark said that he would get the money in Boston. He phoned me every second day and always assured me that he almost had the money. One day he called me and said that he would bring the 5 million dollars the next day. Great! I was watching TV in the evening when it was announced that ... Mark Frechette attempted to rob a bank at gunpoint ... and was arrested."

=== Death ===
Frechette died in prison on September 27, 1975, during an apparent weightlifting accident when a 150-pound (68 kg) barbell fell on his neck and he suffocated. Prison officials did not suspect foul play. Friends thought he had been suffering from depression. He was 27 years old. Frechette is buried at Mount Feake Cemetery, Waltham, Massachusetts.

=== Legacy ===
In 2008, Michael Yaroshevsky produced Death Valley Superstar, a film on Frechette.

In the early 1960s, Frechette was allegedly one of several victims of sexual abuse by Rev. Laurence Francis Xavier Brett of the Roman Catholic Diocese of Bridgeport in Connecticut.

== Filmography ==
Year	Title	Role	Notes
1970	Zabriskie Point	Mark	
1970	Many Wars Ago	sottotenente Sassu	
1971	La grande scrofa nera	Enrico Mazzara	(final film role)
