= Monte Fior =

Mountain in Italy

Coordinates: 45°54′59″N 11°36′00″E

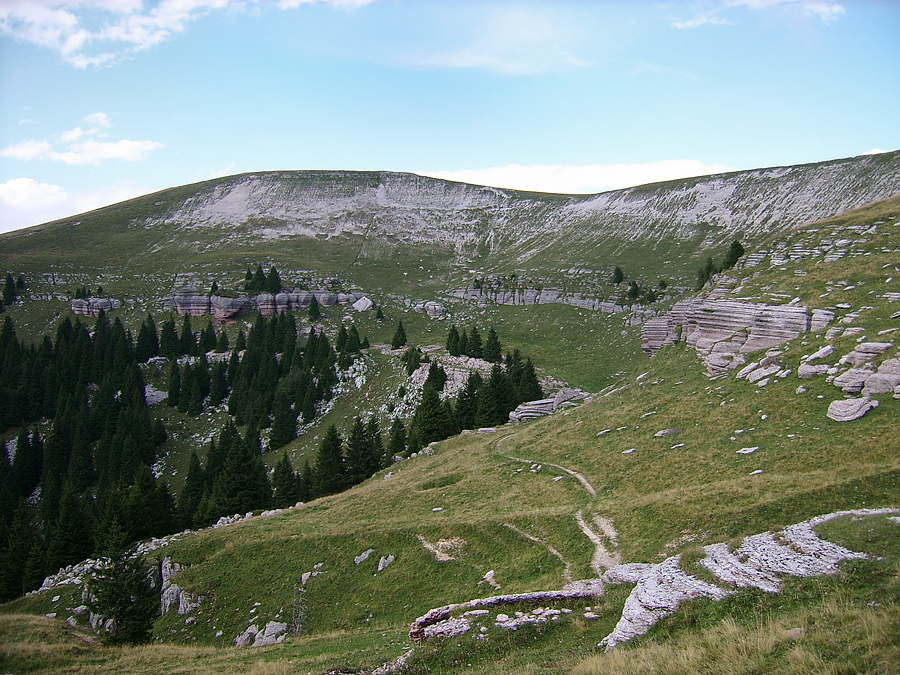

Highest point
- Elevation: 1,824 m (5,984 ft)

Geography
- Location: Veneto, Italy
- Parent range: Vicentine Alps

Monte Fior is a mountain of Veneto, Italy. It is located on the Asiago Plateau, in the Vicentine Alps, and has an elevation of 1,824 metres (5,984 ft).

Monte Fior is the highest peak of the Melette group, in the Province of Vicenza. Along with the rest of the group, it was heavily contested during the First World War; held by the Alpini and the Sassari Brigade, on 7 June 1916 it was captured by Austro-Hungarian troops during the battle of Asiago, after bitter fighting in which over 3,500 men were killed, but it returned in Italian hands a few weeks later. It was again captured by the Austro-Hungarians on 3 December 1917, during the First Battle of Monte Grappa, and held by them until the end of the war.

Part of the events narrated by Emilio Lussu in One Year on the High Plateau take place on Monte Fior.
