= The Paper (American newspaper) =

Underground newspaper in East Lansing, Michigan

- Cover of the first issue of The Paper (December 1965)
- Type: Underground newspaper
- Format: Weekly
- Founder(s): Michael Kindman
- Founded: December 1965
- Political alignment: Radical
- Language: English
- Ceased publication: May 20, 1974 (as Joint Issue)
- City: East Lansing, Michigan
- Free online archives: msupaper.org

The Paper was a weekly underground newspaper published in East Lansing, Michigan, beginning in December 1965. It was one of the five original founding members of the Underground Press Syndicate.

== Publication history ==
Started by Michigan State University student Michael Kindman as a radical, counterculture alternative to the official MSU campus newspaper, The Paper was sympathetic to the politics of SDS. Initially tolerated by the Michigan State University school administration, The Paper briefly received funding from a campus publications board before controversial content caused it to be banned from the MSU campus, but it continued to grow in popularity after the ban.

In the summer of 1966, shortly after the founding of UPS, Kindman met Thorne Dreyer and Carol Neiman from the University of Texas at an SDS summer project in San Francisco and told them about The Paper. Afterward, on their return to Austin, Texas, they were inspired by Kindman's example to found their own pioneering radical college underground paper, The Rag, which was to play an important role in the development of the underground press around the country.

The Paper continued publishing on a regular basis for several years, generally circulating about 5,000 copies. In late 1967, founder Michael Kindman left East Lansing for Boston, where he joined the Mel Lyman Family and briefly served as managing editor of Boston's leading underground paper, Avatar, before its demise.

The Paper continued to appear under that name until June 1969. It subsequently went through a number of title changes, including goob yeak gergibal and Generation East Lansing, before merging with another paper, the Bogue Street Bridge, to form Joint Issue, which lasted until May 20, 1974. The successor to Joint Issue was the Lansing Star, a local alternative paper that was published at first weekly and later biweekly and monthly until 1983, when it was succeeded by Lansing Beat, which survived until at least November 1986.

== Land Grant Man ==
In the Spring of 1966, MSU students James Friel and Stuart Jones, working from an idea by fellow student Steven Badrich, whom they had met at a fund-raising party at Kindman's house, created the comic strip Land Grant Man. Land Grant Man would appear on a nearly weekly basis for the next two years, and sporadically after that. Friel drew all installments of the strip. Jones was succeeded as writer by Jane Munn, and later by several others, including Friel. Land Grant Man, beginning in May 1966, was an early example of underground comics, although its style owed more to the "straight" Marvel comics of the period than to any countercultural influence.

== See also ==
- List of underground newspapers of the 1960s counterculture
