= Settimio Piacentini =

Italian general (1859–1921)

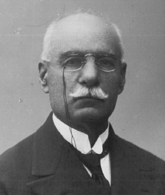
Settimio Piacentini

Settimio Piacentini (6 January 1859 – 2 November 1921) was an Italian General of the Kingdom of Italy who actively participated in the World War I, especially in the Sixth and Seventh Battle of the Isonzo.

In 1916 he commanded the XVI Italian Army Corps in Albania until May 1916 when he was called back to Italy to command the Fifth Army until July 1916 and then the Second Army on the Isonzo Front until June 1917.
By mid 1918, he returned to Albania to become the General Commander (along with Enrico Gotti) of the Italian forces in Vlora, Albania, between 1918 and 1920. He participated in the Battle of Vlora.
