= Zabriskie Point (film) =

1970 film by Michelangelo Antonioni

- Theatrical release poster
- Directed by: Michelangelo Antonioni
- Screenplay by: Michelangelo Antonioni; Fred Gardner; Sam Shepard; Tonino Guerra; Clare Peploe
- Story by: Michelangelo Antonioni
- Produced by: Carlo Ponti; Harrison Starr
- Starring: Mark Frechette; Daria Halprin; Rod Taylor
- Cinematography: Alfio Contini
- Edited by: Franco Arcalli
- Music by: John Fahey; Pink Floyd; Jerry Garcia; Grateful Dead (Robert Hunter, Jerry Garcia); David Lindley; The Rolling Stones (Mick Jagger, Keith Richards); Jesse Colin Young; others (see below)
- Distributed by: Metro-Goldwyn-Mayer
- Release dates: February 5, 1970 (Coronet Theatre); February 9, 1970 (United States)
- Running time: 112 minutes
- Country: United States
- Language: English
- Budget: $7 million
- Box office: $1.072 million (Note: 513,312 admissions (France))

Zabriskie Point (/zəˈbrɪski/) is a 1970 American drama film directed by Michelangelo Antonioni and starring Mark Frechette, Daria Halprin, and Rod Taylor. It was widely noted at the time for its setting in the counterculture of the United States. Some of the movie's scenes were filmed on location at Zabriskie Point in Death Valley. The movie was an overwhelming commercial failure and was panned by most critics upon release. It has to some extent achieved cult status and is noted for its cinematography, a soundtrack featuring Pink Floyd and other popular 1960s rock acts, and direction.

== Plot ==
In a room at a university campus, white and black students argue about an impending student strike. Mark leaves the meeting after saying he is "willing to die, but not of boredom" for the cause. Following a mass arrest at the campus protest, Mark visits a police station hoping to bail his roommate out of jail but is instead arrested for disorderly conduct. After he is released from jail, Mark and another friend buy firearms from a Los Angeles gun shop, saying they need them for "self-defense" to "protect our women."

In a downtown Los Angeles office building, successful real estate executive Lee Allen reviews a television commercial for Sunny Dunes, a new resort-like real estate development in the desert. Instead of actors or models, the slickly produced commercial features casually dressed, smiling mannequins.

Mark goes to a bloody campus confrontation between students and police. Some students are tear-gassed and at least one is shot. As Mark reaches for a gun in his boot, a Los Angeles policeman is shot by an unseen assailant. Mark flees the campus, eventually stealing a Cessna 210 aircraft and flies into the desert.

While flying he sees Daria, a secretary for Allen, who has stolen a car and driven into the desert to find a man who works with "emotionally disturbed" children from Los Angeles. He buzzes her in the plane as she lies face down in the sand. They later meet at the desert shack of an old man, where Mark asks her for a lift so he can buy gasoline for the aircraft. The two then wander to Zabriskie Point, where they have sex. As they begin, other unidentified young naked people congregate near them, their wild games sending up thick clouds of white dust from the desert floor.

Later, Mark intends to kill a California Highway Patrol officer, but Daria blocks his view. She asks Mark if he was the one who killed the cop in Los Angeles. He states that he wanted to, but someone else shot the officer first and that he "never got off a shot".

Daria and Mark paint the airplane with politically charged slogans and psychedelic colors. Daria pleads with Mark to abandon it, but Mark flies back to Los Angeles. The police (along with some radio and television reporters) are waiting for him, and patrol cars chase the aircraft down the runway. Instead of stopping, Mark tries to turn the taxiing aircraft around across the grass and is shot dead by one of the policemen.

Daria learns about Mark's death on the car radio. She drives to Allen's lavish desert home, set high on a rock outcropping near Phoenix, Arizona, where she sees three affluent women sunning themselves and chatting by the swimming pool. Taking a break from a meeting about Sunny Dunes, Allen happily greets Daria. Disturbed to see he has already prepared a guest room for her and exploits his Native American housekeeper, Daria leaves. She pauses to take one final look at the house and imagines it destroyed in an explosion.

== Cast ==
- Mark Frechette as Mark
- Daria Halprin as Daria
- Rod Taylor as Lee Allen
- Paul Fix as Roadhouse owner
- G. D. Spradlin as Lee's associate
- Bill Garaway as Morty
- Kathleen Cleaver as Kathleen
- The Open Theatre of Joe Chaikin as Lovemakers in Death Valley
- Austin Willis as board member

Cast notes

- Harrison Ford has an uncredited role as one of the arrested student demonstrators being held inside a Los Angeles police station.
- Philip Baker Hall has an uncredited role as the owner of the delicatessen.
- Mark Frechette, who had frequently been arrested, was discovered at a bus stop during a verbal confrontation with another man leaning out of the third floor of an apartment building. Antonioni's casting director, Sally Dennison, witnessed the fight and recommended him to the director, noting, "He's twenty, and he hates."
- Daria Halprin and Mark Frechette fell in love and moved together to Mel Lyman's experimental Fort Hill Community. She later was married to Dennis Hopper for four years.
- Along with three other members of the Fort Hill Community, Mark Frechette committed a bank robbery in 1973, using a gun with no bullets. He died in prison, ostensibly in a weight-lifting accident.

== Production ==
=== Development ===
While in the United States for the 1966 premiere of his film Blowup, which had been a surprise box-office hit, Antonioni saw a short newspaper article about a young man who had stolen an aircraft and was killed when he tried to return it in Phoenix, Arizona. Antonioni took this as a thread, with which he could tie together the plot of his next film. After writing many drafts, he hired playwright Sam Shepard to write the script. Shepard, Antonioni, Italian filmmaker Franco Rossetti, Antonioni's frequent collaborator screenwriter Tonino Guerra and Clare Peploe (later to become the wife of Bernardo Bertolucci), worked on the screenplay.

=== Casting ===
The lead roles went to two non-professional actors, Mark Frechette and Daria Halprin. Halprin was cast based on her appearance in the documentary Revolution, and Frechette was offered the role when a casting director overheard him having a heated argument in a bus station. Neither actor performed a screen test.

Most of the supporting roles were played by a professional cast, including Rod Taylor along with G. D. Spradlin, in one of his early feature film roles, following many appearances on U.S. national television. Paul Fix, a friend and acting coach of John Wayne who had appeared in many of Wayne's films, played the owner of a roadhouse in the Mojave Desert. Kathleen Cleaver, a member of the Black Panthers and wife of Eldridge Cleaver, appeared in the documentary-like student meeting scene at the opening of the film.

=== Filming ===
Shooting began in July 1968 in Los Angeles, much of it on location in the wider southern downtown area. Exteriors of the art deco Richfield Tower were shown in a few scenes shot shortly before its demolition in November of that year. Various college campus scenes, excluding the scene of the student meeting, were filmed on location at Contra Costa Community College in San Pablo, California. The production then moved to location shooting at Carefree, Arizona, near Phoenix and from there to Death Valley. The production rented a mansion in Carefree and built a replica of it on the lot of Southwestern Studio in Carefree for the special effect of blowing it up. Location shooting also took place in the Mojave Desert.

Early film industry publicity reports said Antonioni would gather 10,000 extras in the desert to film the sex scene, but this did not happen. The scene was filmed with dust-covered and highly choreographed actors from The Open Theatre. The United States Department of Justice investigated whether this violated the Mann Act, which forbade the taking of women across state lines for sexual purposes; however, no sex was filmed and no state lines were crossed, given that Death Valley is in California. State officials in Sacramento were also ready to charge Antonioni with "immoral conduct, prostitution or debauchery" if he staged an actual orgy. FBI officials investigated the film because of Antonioni's political views, and officials in Oakland, California, accused the director of staging a real riot for a scene early in the film.

During filming, Antonioni was quoted as criticizing the U.S. film industry for financially wasteful production practices, which he found "almost immoral" compared to the more thrifty approach of Italian studios.

== Music ==
=== Soundtrack ===
The soundtrack to Zabriskie Point includes music from Pink Floyd, The Youngbloods, Kaleidoscope, Jerry Garcia, Patti Page, Grateful Dead, the Rolling Stones, and John Fahey. Roy Orbison wrote and sang the theme song, over the credits, called "So Young (Love Theme from Zabriskie Point)".

=== Unused music ===
Richard Wright of Pink Floyd wrote a song called "The Violent Sequence" for inclusion in the film. Antonioni rejected the song because it was too subdued and instead synchronized a re-recording of the band's "Careful with That Axe, Eugene", retitled "Come in Number 51, Your Time Is Up", with the film's violent ending scene. Roger Waters states in Classic Albums – Pink Floyd – Making The Dark Side of the Moon that while he loved the song, Antonioni said it was "too sad" and that it reminded him of church. Eventually it was reworked into a new song known as "Us and Them", which was released on their album The Dark Side of the Moon in 1973. "The Violent Sequence" remained unreleased until it was included on a 2011 boxed set of Dark Side of the Moon, where it was named "Us and Them (Richard Wright Demo)".

Other discarded pieces recorded for the film by Pink Floyd were released on a bonus disc with the 1997 CD re-release of the soundtrack album, along with pieces by Jerry Garcia.

John Fahey was flown to Rome to record some music for the film, but it was not used. The accounts of Fahey and others differ. However, a portion of his Dance of Death was used in the film. Fahey and Antonioni came to blows after the latter made anti-American remarks. Fahey would eventually call the film "a really terrible and long skin flick." Antonioni visited The Doors while they were recording their album Morrison Hotel and thought about putting them in the soundtrack. The Doors recorded the song "L'America" for Zabriskie Point, but it was not used.

Mark Frechette was living at Mel Lyman's intentional community at Fort Hill, Boston, at the time he made this film. He and Lyman hoped that the soundtrack would include some of the Americana type music Lyman had recorded with Jim Kweskin and the Jug Band. Frechette left copies of Lyman's newspaper Avatar around the studio and took time to play tapes of the band for the director and explain Lyman's work. When Antonioni seemed oblivious to the perceived importance of Lyman's music, Frechette quit the film, but returned six days later.

== Release ==
Following prolonged publicity and controversy in North America throughout its production, Zabriskie Point had its premiere at Walter Reade's Coronet Theatre in New York City on February 5, 1970, almost four years after Antonioni began pre-production and over a year and a half after shooting began, before being generally released on February 9, 1970.

=== Certification ===
Despite the explicit language and sexual content, the film received an R rating rather than an X, in a shift in the MPAA's policy.

=== Reception ===
Decades after its widely panned 1970 release, Zabriskie Point garnered critical praise for its cinematography. Halprin and Frechette can barely be seen in the left of this scene filmed at Zabriskie Point.

The film was panned by most critics and other published commentators of all political stripes, as were the performances of Frechette and Halprin. The New York Times reviewer Vincent Canby called Zabriskie Point "a noble artistic impulse short-circuited in a foreign land." Roger Ebert echoed Canby, writing: "The director who made Monica Vitti seem so incredibly alone is incapable, in Zabriskie Point, of making his young characters seem even slightly together. Their voices are empty; they have no resonance as human beings. They don't play to each other, but to vague narcissistic conceptions of themselves. They wouldn't even meet were it not for a preposterous Hollywood coincidence."

The counterculture audience MGM hoped to draw largely ignored the film during its brief theatrical run. Production expenses were at least $7 million and only $900,000 was made in the domestic release. The film was listed in the 1978 book The Fifty Worst Films of All Time and has been described as "the worst film ever made by a director of genius". It has been described as "the worst film ever made by a director of genius" but it "is still absolutely watchable because of the magic of Antonioni's eye". Over 20 years after the film's release, Rolling Stone editor David Fricke wrote that "Zabriskie Point was one of the most extraordinary disasters in modern cinematic history." It was the only film Antonioni directed in the United States, where in 1994 he was given the Honorary Academy Award "in recognition of his place as one of the cinema's master visual stylists."

However, its critical standing has increased in the decades since. With early 21st-century screenings of pristine wide-screen prints and a later DVD release, Zabriskie Point at last garnered some critical praise, mostly for the stark beauty of its cinematography and innovative use of music in the soundtrack, but opinions about the film were still mixed.

Director Stéphane Sednaoui referenced the film in his video for "Today" by The Smashing Pumpkins, in which an ice-cream salesman steals his employer's ice-cream van, escapes to the desert, and colourfully paints the van while couples kiss. In 1998, Jonathan Rosenbaum of the Chicago Reader included the film in his unranked list of the best American films not included on the AFI Top 100. In 2026, Amanda Webster of The New York Times included Zabriskie Point among a list of films that could be considered "the definitive movie about America."

On the review aggregator website Rotten Tomatoes, the film has a 64% approval rating based on 33 reviews from film critics, with an average rating of 6.9/10.

In 2026, Richard Linklater praised Zabriskie Point as the "most subversive studio film ever made," saying:

To realize that so far in the past—60, what is it? 67 years; a long time ago now—and yet it’s such a portrait of a moment in time. Everyone really crapped on the effort at the time. Who’s this old Italian guy coming here, telling us what’s going on? But he left us a little treasure, a little gift. This artist came and just took the temperature and felt his way through a movie in the southern California area. He really explored something of a time and a place and a malaise and a youth, and goddamn it’s beautiful. It’s beautiful and haunting and sad and wonderful and sexy and hallucinatory and, dammit, I was so appreciative.

To know it got no love. But who wins the long game? Antonioni. I’m sitting here, raving about this film that I thought I knew. I don’t know. I just love the power of cinema, and time. That was the latest thing that knocked me out.

He got these kids to be real kids. He had the guts. These two people just being themselves. They’re not trained actors but they’re just real—they’re real people. That was a criticism of the movie. “Oh, the performances are bad.” No, they’re authentic. There’s an authenticity to it all, I feel, and what it doesn’t have in one kind of polish it more than makes up for in just utter, lived authenticity. And it’s a studio movie, too. Geez. Unbelievable.

== See also ==
- Michelangelo Antonioni filmography
- List of American films of 1970
- Zabriskie Point (album)
