= Italian campaign in Albania (World War I) =

Military campaign during WWI, 1916–1918

Italian invasion of Albania
- Part of World War I in Albania during the Balkans theatre of World War I and the collapse of the Principality of Albania
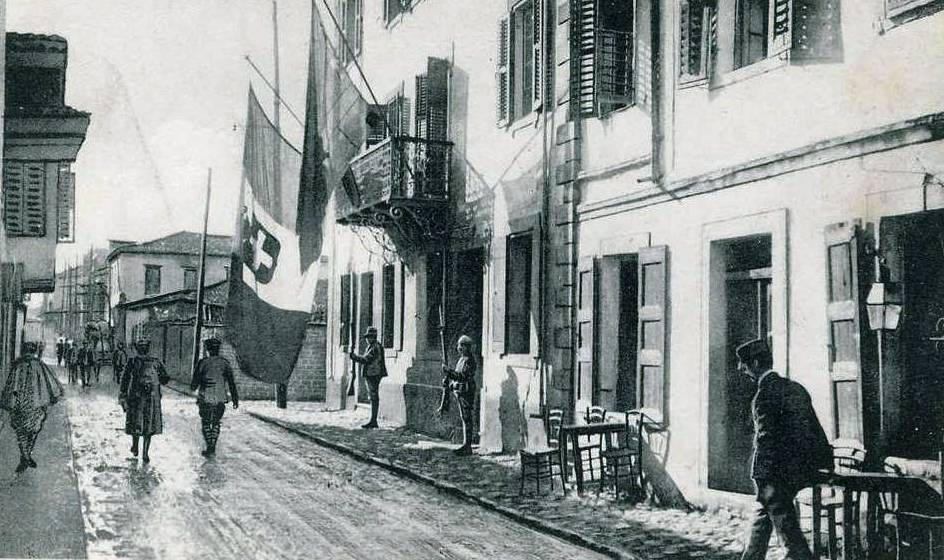
- Italian soldiers in Vlorë, Albania, during World War I. The tricolour flag of Italy bearing the Savoy royal shield is shown hanging alongside an Albanian flag from the balcony of the Italian prefecture headquarters.
Date	1916 – 1918 (Occupation of Vlorë and Saseno since 1914)
Location	Southern Albania
Result	Italian victory

Belligerents
Italy: Italian-occupied Albania; Supported by: Kingdom of Serbia	Austria-Hungary: Austro-Hungarian occupied Albania; Albanian volunteers and irregulars

Commanders and leaders
(Kingdom of Italy) Settimio Piacentini (Kingdom of Italy) Emilio Bertotti (Kingdom of Italy) Giacinto Ferrero (Kingdom of Italy) Oreste Bandini (Kingdom of Italy) Settimio Piacentini; Turhan Përmeti	(Austria-Hungary) Hermann Kövess von Kövessháza (Austria-Hungary) Ignaz Trollmann (Austria-Hungary) Karl von Pflanzer-Baltin (Austria-Hungary) Ludwig Können-Horák; Ahmet Zogu; Prênk Bibë Doda

Units involved
(Kingdom of Italy) Italian XVI Army Corps "Corpo Speciale d’Albania": 38th brigades ("Savona" and "Puglie"); 43rd brigades ("Arno" and "Marche"); 44th brigades ("Taranto" and "Verona")	(Austria-Hungary) Austrian XIX Army Corps: 47th and 81st divisions; 220th k.k. Landsturm brigade; (Austria-Hungary) Austrian 3rd Army Corps; Albanian irregulars: "Albaner legion", divided into nine small battalions

Strength
(Kingdom of Italy) approx. 100,000 men (initially) (Kingdom of Italy) About 144,000 men (peak)	(Austria-Hungary) 100,000+ men 5,000–6,000 irregulars and militia

Casualties and losses
(Kingdom of Italy) Total: 2,214 casualties (1916–1918): 298 dead; 1,069 wounded; 847 missing	(Austria-Hungary) approx. 2,000 prisoners in Berat; Unknown
- More casualty details in body text

The Italian Campaign of Albania (in Italian: Campagna Italiana di Albania), took place between 1916 and 1918 in the territory of Albania, as part of the wider events of the Balkans theatre of World War I.

At the outbreak of the war, Albania, which had been independent for less than two years, was in a state of deep internal crisis, with the weak government of Prime Minister Essad Pasha (allied with the Kingdom of Serbia) undermined by armed groups supported by Austria-Hungary and by the territorial claims of neighboring states, particularly Italy and Greece. The defeat of the Serbian army by the Central Powers in October 1915 and its retreat towards the Adriatic coast through northern Albania prompted Austria-Hungary to invade the country and, conversely, Italy to deploy its expeditionary force to protect the Serbian soldiers during the retreat and to maintain possession of the strategic port of Valona (which was occupied in December 1914); the situation stabilized at the end of 1916, with the Austro-Hungarians masters of the northern and central regions and the Italians of the south, where they found support from French forces engaged on the Macedonian front. Meanwhile, to protect the Greek minority, Greek control was established in the southern districts replacing the Northern Epirote units beginning in October 1914, but Italian troops drove the Greeks from southern Albania in 1916.

Map of Albanian fragmentation in 1916. The Italians overran the Austro-Hungarian area in 1918.

The Albanian front remained stationary until mid-1918 when, as part of the larger offensives undertaken by the Allies in the Balkans, the Italian forces went on the attack, progressively overrunning the Austro-Hungarians area by October 31, 1918. The signing of the Armistice of Villa Giusti on 3 November 1918 marked the end of hostilities with Austria-Hungary.

== Historical context ==
=== Constitution of Independent Albania ===
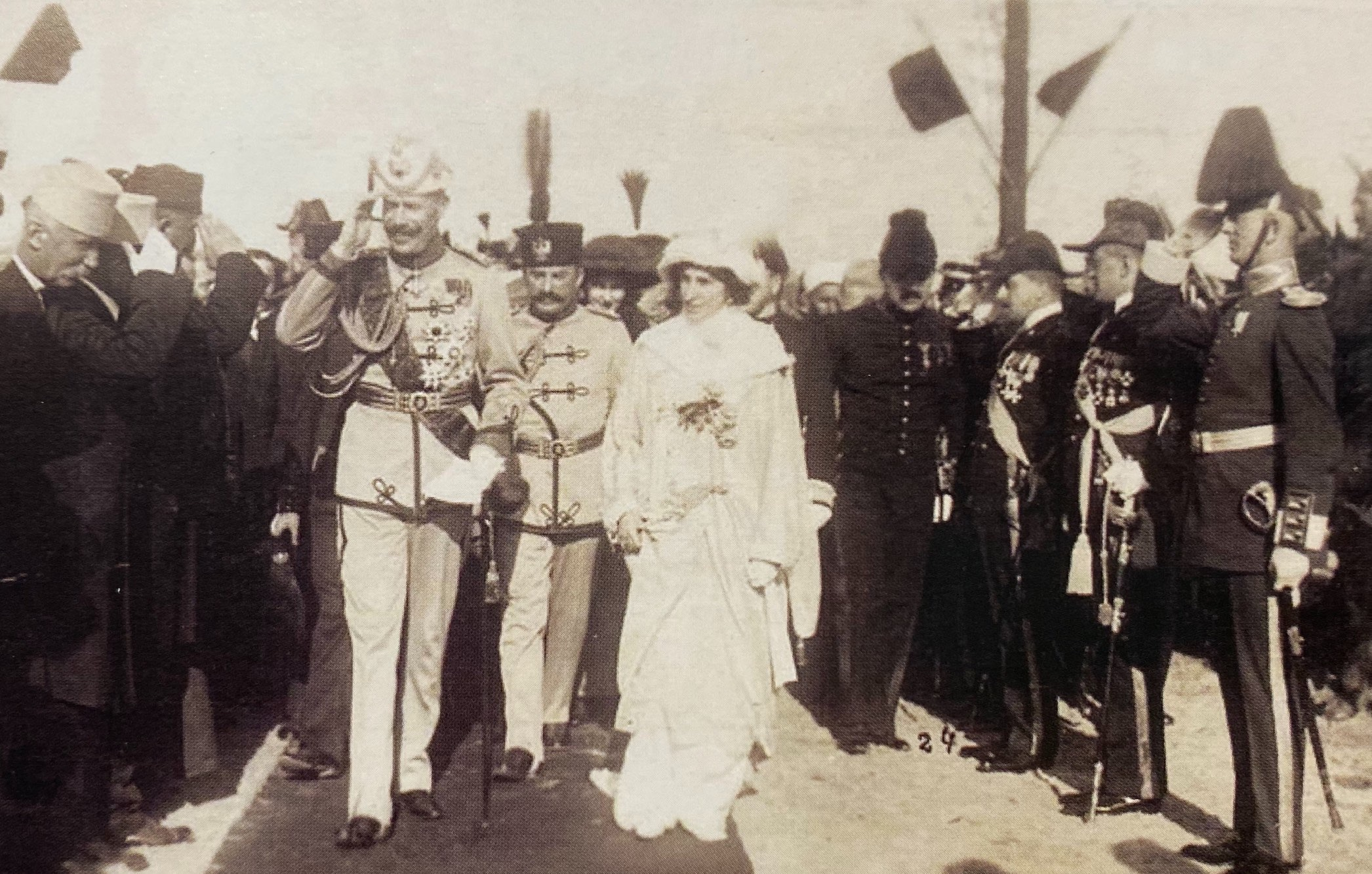
Wilhelm of Wied arriving in Durazzo on March 7, 1914.

Long a possession of the Ottoman Empire, Albania gained independence on the eve of World War I: in January 1912 a large revolt in Albanian territories forced the Ottoman authorities to accept an agreement granting broad autonomy to the region, and on 28 November 1912 an assembly of local nationalists gathered in Vlorë proclaimed the independence of the nation as "independent Albania" and the establishment of a provisional Albanian government headed by Ismail Qemali. The neighbouring Balkan nations, however, had different expansionist aims on the territories of Albania itself, aims which came to fruition during the events of the First Balkan War (October 1912-May 1913): the Kingdom of Montenegro aimed at annexing the city of Scutari in the north, the Kingdom of Serbia aspired to the possession of northern and central Albania in order to obtain an outlet to the Adriatic Sea (which concluded in the formation of the Drač County), while the Kingdom of Greece aimed at occupying Northern Epirus, a region inhabited by a large Greek minority.

The expansionist aims of the states of the "Balkan League" found prompt opposition from the Austro-Hungarian Empire, which in particular opposed the obtaining of an outlet to the sea for enemy Serbia, and from the Kingdom of Italy, which looked favourably upon an independent Albania on which to exercise a dominant political influence. The ambassadors of the main European powers, meeting in London to redraw the territorial layout of the Balkans, now irremediably changed by the conflict, therefore supported the idea of an independent Albania to which the nations of the League had to submit: the Treaty of London of 30 May 1913, concluding the First Balkan War, therefore recognised the institution of an independent Albanian state extending from Scutari to Northern Epirus. For the government of the new state the great powers chose a German prince, Wilhelm of Wied, who on 7 March 1914 was crowned as sovereign of the Principality of Albania, for which the International Control Commission, appointed by the powers, was given the task of organizing the administration of the new state with the help of an International Gendarmerie composed of local troops supervised by Dutch officers, who were gradually replaced by German and Austrian officers who arrived in Durazzo on July 4.

=== Collapse of the Central Government ===
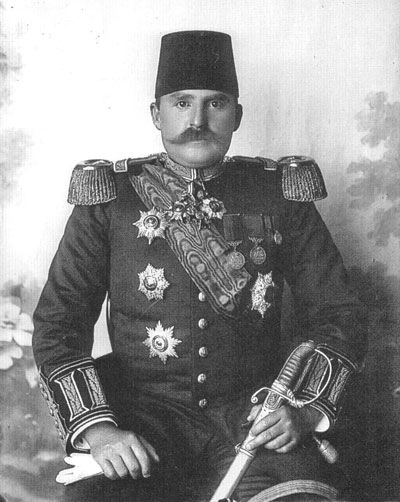
Essad Pasha, the pro-serbian prime minister of Albania.

The internal situation of independent Albania was more chaotic than ever, a condition fueled both by the destabilizing maneuvers of neighboring nations and by political divisions among the Albanian nationalists themselves. Essad Pasha, former Ottoman general and leader of the resistance of Scutari to the siege of the Montenegrins, established in October 1913 a "Republic of Central Albania" with its headquarters in Durazzo, presenting itself as an alternative to the provisional government of Ismail Qemali located in Valona; under pressure from the European powers Essad then accepted the post of Minister of the Interior in the nascent government of Prince Wilhelm, but in January 1914, strong in the support of the Serbs, he attempted a coup d'état in Elbasan with the units of the Albanian gendarmerie, clashing with the units of the International Gendarmerie and those of the regular army that remained faithful to Wilhelm. In the south, on 28 February 1914 the regions inhabited by Greeks proclaimed independence as the Autonomous Republic of Northern Epirus under the leadership of Georgios Christakis-Zografos with the open support of the government of Athens, while in the north the local Catholic clans supported by Austria-Hungary with an anti-Serbian function established their own militias under the leadership of Prênk Bibë Doda and Bajram Curri, who were joined by the armed groups of the nationalist leader Isa Boletini recruited among the Albanian expatriates of Kosovo, who fled after the annexation of the region to Serbia; the rest of the country was then affected by widespread banditry, as well as riots organised by the various clans against each other.

The anti-Muslim alliance between the Catholics of the north, the Kosovars of Boletini and the Gendarmerie of Prince Wilhelm put Essad Pasha's forces in a hard situation, forcing him into exile in Italy in May 1914; a vast peasant revolt of Muslim inspiration, led by Haxhi Qamili from the central regions and in favour of a restoration of Ottoman rule over Albania, however, put the central authorities in such difficulty that their control was reduced in practice to the sole provisional capital of Durazzo after the capture by the rebels of Berat on 12 July 1914 and of Valona on 21 August. On 3 September 1914 Prince Wilhelm, although not formally renouncing his role as monarch, left Albania to take refuge in Venice and was exlied there without trial. Three days later, the International Control Commission ceased to exist, leaving the country at the mercy of chaos.

The Albanian Senate appealed to the exiled Essad Pasha to form a new government; with Italian support, on 17 September 1914 Essad signed a treaty of alliance with Serbian Prime Minister Nikola Pašić which guaranteed him economic and military support for his work of reconquering Albania. Essad returned to Albania in October 1914 and his forces quickly secured control of Durazzo and the central regions, but failed to restore order in the rest of the country: while the northern regions remained out of control, after clashes between Essad's men and Epirote independentists, on 27 October 1914 the Greek army invaded Northern Epirus and established a military administration on the territories formerly part of the Autonomous Republic of Northern Epirus.

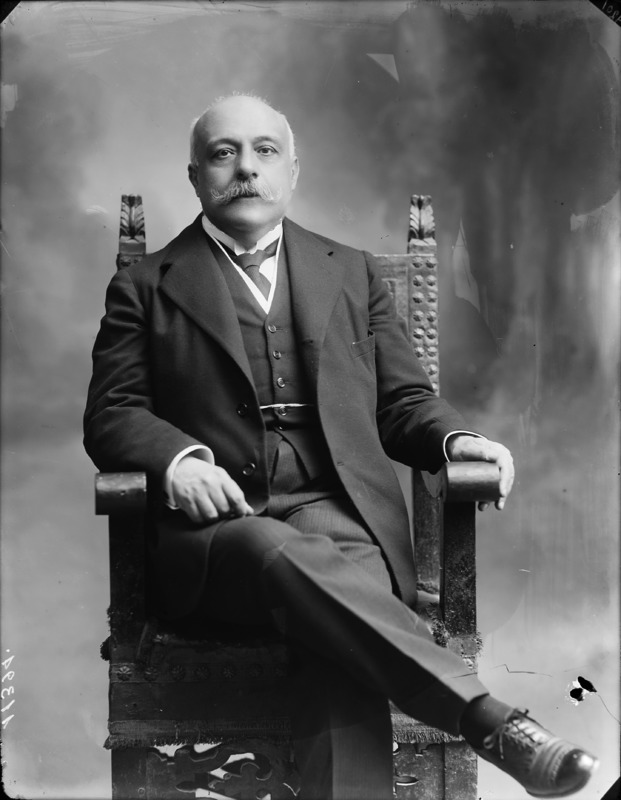
Italian prime minister Antonio Salandra.

The Greek move worried the Italian government, fearful that Athens was acting under the aegis of Austria-Hungary to guarantee Vienna the possession of Valona and therefore the passage through the Strait of Otranto; presenting its move as an attempt to limit the smuggling of arms into the Albanian region, on 31 October 1914 the government of Prime Minister Antonio Salandra ordered the occupation of the Albanian islet of Saseno by a landing force of the Regia Marina, followed on 26 December by the unopposed landing in the port of Valona of units of Italian sailors later joined by a regiment of bersaglieri and a battery of mountain artillery of the Regio Esercito.

== Course of the campaign ==
=== First operations and serbian front ===
The events of the internal crisis in Albania were now becoming linked to those of the First World War, which began on 28 July 1914 with the declaration of war by Austria-Hungary against Serbia (July Crisis) when Archduke Franz Ferdinand was assassinated. The Austro-Hungarians began to supply weapons and funds to the Catholic militias of Bajram Curri and the Kosovar armed groups of Isa Boletini so that they could conduct raids and harassment actions against Serbian positions in Kosovo. The situation of the pro-Serbian government of Essad Pasha worsened in November, with the entry into the war of the Ottoman Empire on the side of the Central Powers: the authorities in Constantinople (Istanbul) proclaimed a jihad against the nations of the Triple Entente and their allies, and groups of Muslim rebels soon put Essad's Albanian gendarmes in a tight spot, cutting him off and effectively besieging him inside Durazzo.

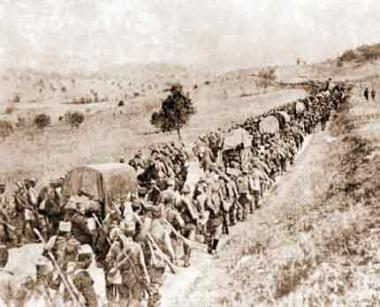
Serbian forces retreat through Albania in late 1915.

Essad's critical position prompted his Serbian allies to intervene: on 29 May 1915, a contingent of 20,000 Serbian soldiers under the command of General Dragutin Milutinović invaded northern Albania from three directions, quickly dispersing the pro-Habsburg militias of Curri and Boletini, forcing them to take refuge in their strongholds in the district of Mirdita; within ten days the Serbs extended their occupation to the central regions, taking Elbasan and Tirana and freeing Essad's forces in Durazzo from the siege of the Muslim rebels. Taking advantage of the situation, on 11 June King Nicholas I of Montenegro, an ally of the Serbs, ordered the occupation of Albanian territory north of the Drin River, and on 15 June the Montenegrins entered Scutari; although at least formally Essad's government was in favour of the Triple Entente, the Allied governments began to formulate a territorial division of Albania between Montenegro, Serbia, Greece and Italy, and agreements in this sense were outlined during the stipulation in April 1915 of the London Pact with the Italian government, which was about to declare war against Austria-Hungary.

The entry into the war of the Kingdom of Bulgaria on the side of the Central Powers on 7 October 1915 sealed the fate of Serbia: attacked from the north by a joint Austro-German army and from the east by the Bulgarians, the Serbian army was defeated and routed towards the region of Kosovo; the landing of Anglo-French forces at Salonika failed to bring any benefit to Serbia, as the Bulgarian troops quickly occupied Vardar Macedonia, preventing the reunion of the allies. On 28 November 1915, the Serbian commander-in-chief, General Radomir Putnik, ordered a general retreat from Kosovo towards northern Albania and the Adriatic coast, from where the Serbs hoped to obtain relief from the Allied naval forces: in the middle of winter, under heavy snowfall and with poor supplies of food, the Serbian forces had to cross the difficult mountainous region of Prokletije, losing tens of thousands of men to hardship, hypothermia and attacks by Albanian irregulars before reaching the areas controlled by Essad Pasha's gendarmes.

=== Serbian evacuation and Italian intervention ===
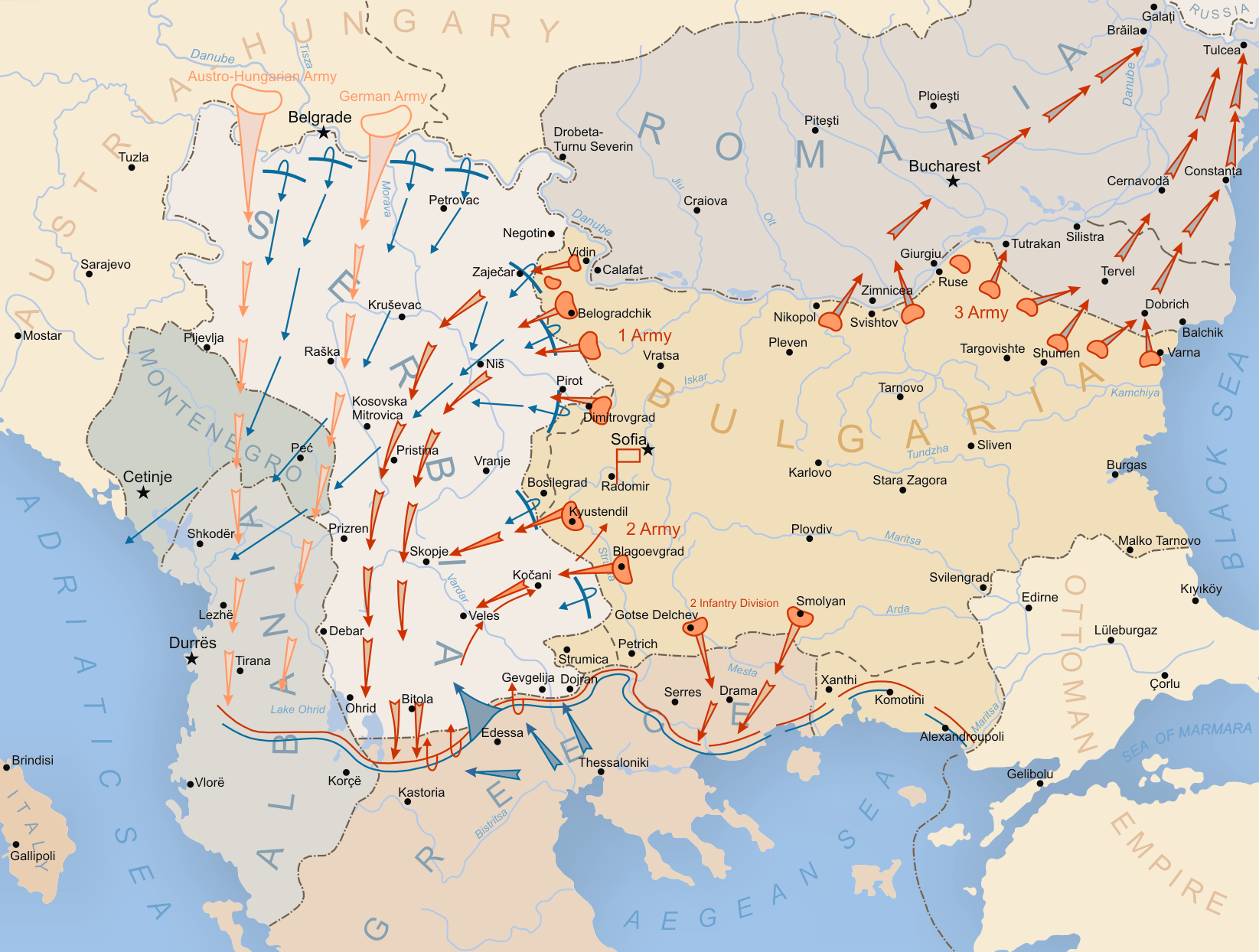
Operations of the forces of the Central Powers in the Balkans between October 1915 and August 1916.

Faced with the collapse of Serbia in October 1915, the Entente governments pressured Italy to send a contingent to Albania and to make its naval forces in the Adriatic available to bring supplies to Putnik's men. After long discussions between the Italians, French and British about the distribution of the burden of the operation, on 22 November 1915 the naval supply missions from Italy to Albania began, while at the beginning of December the landing of Italian troops began: on 1 December a naval convoy brought to Valona the first 5,000 soldiers of the "Italian Special Corps of Albania", brought to a total of 28,000 men under General Emilio Bertotti by mid-December and to 50,000 men in January, with the "Savona" and "Verona" brigades, two regiments of territorial militia, a cavalry squadron, three mountain batteries and four heavy artillery batteries.

The Austro-Hungarian fleet attempted to disturb these operations: on 5 December the light cruiser Novara with four destroyers and three torpedo boats bombarded the port of San Giovanni di Medua sinking two cargo ships, while on 6 December the cruiser Helgoland with six destroyers attacked the roadstead of Durazzo sinking two Italian and three Albanian sailing ships. On 29 December the Helgoland and five destroyers carried out a new action against Durazzo, but the group ended up in a naval minefield losing the destroyer Lika while the same type Triglav, damaged, was then sunk after being intercepted by an Anglo-French-Italian naval group. The failure led to the suspension of Austro-Hungarian surface raids against traffic directed to Albania, which were countered by the actions of thesubmarines only.

After defeating and forcing Montenegro to surrender in a rapid campaign after the Battle of Lovćen Pass, at the end of January 1916 Austro-Hungarian forces invaded northern Albania in pursuit of the remnants of the Serbian army, while Bulgarian units penetrated the country from the north-east across the Drin river: the Bulgarians took Elbasan on 29 January, while the Austro-Hungarian XIX Corps under General Ignaz Trollmann von Lovcenberg (with the 47th, 81st Infantry Divisions and the 220th k.k. Landsturm Brigade) began to fight its way into central Albania. The exhausted Serbian army was unable to oppose this invasion, and it was therefore decided to evacuate it by sea: Italian, French and British ships began the first embarkations of troops from the ports of San Giovanni di Medua and Durazzo on 12 December 1915, and on 24 December King Peter I of Serbia embarked with his entourage to Brindisi; the Italians insisted strongly that the Serbian army move from its quarters in the north to the safer port of Valona in the south, a manoeuvre which began on 7 January 1916. Two interventions by surface units of the Austro-Hungarian fleet against the convoys, on 27 January and 6 February, were effectively repelled by the Allied escort units.

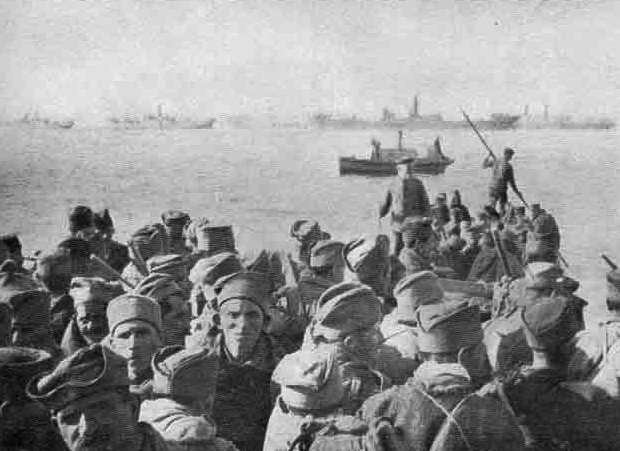
Serbian soldiers during the evacuation operations by sea from Albanian ports.

The embarkation operations from San Giovanni di Medua concluded on 22 January and the city was evacuated, ending up being occupied by the Austro-Hungarians on 29 January; the embarkation of the Serbs from Durazzo ended on 9 February, but it was decided to keep the Italian garrison already present in the port (about 9,000 men of the "Savona" Brigade with artillery and support units, under the command of General Giacinto Ferrero) in an attempt to ensure the protection of the weak government of Essad Pasha. The Austro-Hungarian XIX Corps occupied Tirana on 11 February without encountering resistance, and then approached Durazzo; after a failed surprise assault on the Italian positions in the village of Pieskza, the Austro-Hungarians began a strong attack on the morning of 23 February, immediately putting Ferrero's units under pressure and pushing the Italian command to order the evacuation of the city. Despite the rough sea and the Austro-Hungarian artillery fire, the Italian troops managed to embark on the transports hastily assembled for the operation, while the battleship Enrico Dandolo and the destroyers of the Regia Marina kept the enemy units at bay with their large calibre guns; the last units of the "Savona" Brigade were embarked on the evening of 26 February and transported to safety in Valona, after having lost around 800 men between dead, wounded and prisoners. Among those evacuated from Durazzo there was also Essad Pasha with the remains of his government and several hundred loyalists, transported to safety in Italy; after a stay in Rome and Paris, in August 1916 Essad reached Salonika where with the assistance of the Serbs and the French he set up a cabinet recognised by the Allies as the Albanian government in exile.

=== Expeditionary corps in Albania ===
The Kingdom of Italy occupied the port of Vlorë in December 1914, but had to withdraw after the Austrian-Hungarian invasion in late 1915–early 1916, and the fall of Durrës on 27 February 1916. In May 1916, the Italian XVI Corps, some 100,000 men under the command of General Settimio Piacentini, returned and occupied part of southern Albania by the autumn 1916, while the French army occupied Korçë and its surrounding areas on 29 November 1916. The Italian forces (in Gjirokastër) and French forces (in Korçë), according mainly to the development of the Balkans theatre, entered the area of former Autonomous Republic of Northern Epirus (controlled by the Greek minority) in autumn 1916, after approval of the Triple Entente.

The establishment of the Autonomous Albanian Republic of Korçë was done on 10 December 1916, by French authorities with a protocol, according to which an autonomous province would be established on the territories of Korçë, Bilishti, Kolonja, Opar and Gora in eastern Albania.

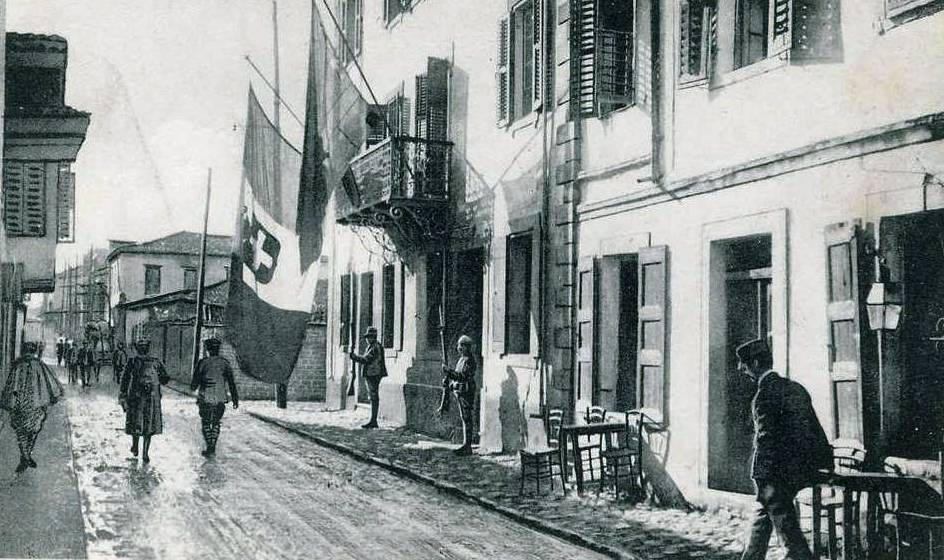
Italian soldiers in Vlorë, Albania, during World War I. The tricolour flag of Italy bearing the Savoy royal shield is shown hanging alongside an Albanian flag from the balcony of the Italian prefecture headquarters.

On 12 December 1916, Italy asked for explanations from the Quai d'Orsay, through its ambassador, because the establishment of the Autonomous Albanian Republic of Korçë violated the Treaty of London. Austria-Hungary used French precedent in Korçë to justify the proclamation of independence of Albania under Austrian protection on 3 January 1917, in Shkodra.

The Kingdom of Italy did the same when proclaiming independence of Albania under its protection on 23 June 1917, in Gjirokastra by general Giacinto Ferrero proclaimed on that day the independence of Albania, who in the next weeks occupied Ioannina in Epirus. Neither Great Britain nor France had been consulted beforehand. This Albanian republic under the leadership of Turhan Përmeti, protected by 100,000 soldiers of the Italian Army, adopted officially a red flag with a black eagle in the middle, but raised a storm of protests even in the Italian Parliament.

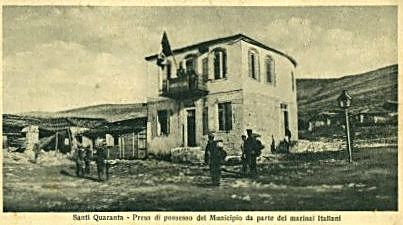
1917 postcard from Italian-occupied Sarande

In autumn 1918, the Italians expanded occupations to areas of northern Greece (around Kastoria) and western Macedonia (around Bitola), conquered from the Bulgarians and Ottomans. On 25 September the Italian 35 Division reached and occupied Krusevo deep inside western Macedonia. In October 1918, the Italian XVI Corpo d' Armata (nearly four divisions, with 2 Albanian volunteers battalions) conquered all north-central Albania from the Austrians: on 14 October Durrës, the next day Tirana and on 31 October Scutari; finally on 3 November Ulcinj and Bar in coastal Montenegro were taken.

In November 1918, when World War I finished, nearly all what is now contemporary Albania was under the Italian influence. A Regency government was announced following the end of the war. The French expedition withdrew from Korçë in May 1920, resulting in the area being ceded to the Regency. In a country that lacked nearly everything after centuries of Ottoman rule, were built 546 km (339 mi) of new roads, 110 km (68 mi) of new railroads, 3,000 km (1,900 mi) of telegraph lines, 9 teleferics, a few hospitals and some modern administrative buildings.

An Italian expeditionary corps in Albania took part in the fighting during the Albanian campaign of World War I. Already in 1914, before the Italian entry in the war, Italians occupied the Bay of Valona and the island of Saseno. From 1915 to 1918, Italians sent reinforcements that confronted Austro-Hungarian forces in Albania. In 1920, Italy evacuated Valona and annexed Saseno.

==== After World War I ====
A delegation sent by a postwar Albanian National Assembly that met at Durrës in December 1918 defended Albanian interests at the Paris Peace Conference, but the conference denied Albania official representation. The National Assembly, anxious to keep Albania intact, expressed willingness to accept Italian protection and even an Italian prince as a ruler so long as it would mean Albania did not lose territory.

But in January 1920, at the Paris Peace Conference, negotiators from France, Britain, Italy and Greece agreed to divide Albania among Yugoslavia, Italy, and Greece as a diplomatic expedient aimed at finding a compromise solution to the territorial conflict between Italy and Yugoslavia. The deal gave the Valona territory and areas of south-central Albania to Italy. This deal created huge anti-Italian resentment between many Albanians and in May 1920 the Italians (even because of demobilisation of their troops after World War I ended) withdrew to some important cities (Durazzo, Scutari, Tirane, Valona, Tepelani and Clisura) and their surrounding areas: subsequently they were forced to fight the Vlora War. The revolutionary movements in Italy made the presence of the last 20,000 soldiers of the Italian Army in Albania basically impossible.

On August 2, 1920, the Albanian-Italian protocol was signed, upon which Italy abandoned Vlora, while it officially annexed the island of Saseno (both territories had been occupied in 1914). This put an end to Italian claims for a mandate over Albania, rescuing the territory of the Albanian state from further partition. However, the treaties of Tirana (in addition to the 1920 agreement, two more were signed in 1926 and 1927) gave Italy growing protection over the country. Although more and more in the Italian sphere of influence, the country remained officially independent until, in 1939, Benito Mussolini ordered an Italian invasion of Albania and forced the Kingdom of Albania in personal union with Italy.

== See also ==
- Albania during World War I
- Autonomous Albanian Republic of Korçë
- History of Albania
- Principality of Albania
- Italian invasion of Albania
- Autonomous Republic of Northern Epirus

== Sources ==
- Nigel Thomas; Dušan Babac (2014). LEG Edizioni (ed.). Gli eserciti balcanici nella prima guerra mondiale. Gorizia. ISBN 978-88-6102-183-9.
- Richard C. Hall (9 October 2014). War in the Balkans: An Encyclopedic History from the Fall of the Ottoman Empire to the Breakup of Yugoslavia. ABC-CLIO. ISBN 978-1-61069-031-7.
- Pearson, Owen (2004). Albania in the Twentieth Century, A History: Volume I: Albania and King Zog, 1908–39. I.B. Tauris. ISBN 9781845110130. - Total pages: 585
- Stickney, Edith Pierpont (1924). Southern Albania, 1912–1923. Stanford University Press. ISBN 9780804761710.
- Ivetic, Egidio (2006). il Mulino - Universale Paperbacks (ed.). Le guerre balcaniche. Il Mulino. ISBN 88-15-11373-8.
- Vickers, Miranda (1999). The Albanians: A Modern History. I.B. Tauris. ISBN 978-1-86064-541-9.
- Favre, Franco (2008). Gaspari (ed.). La Marina nella Grande Guerra. Udine. ISBN 978-88-7541-135-0.
- New-York Tribune (December 28, 1914). "Italy Notifies the Powers Albania Shall Not Join War". New-York Tribune.
- The New York Sun (November 1, 1914). "Italy Occupies Saseno". The New York Sun.
- Albertini, Luigi (1952–1953). Origins of the War of 1914. London: Oxford University Press. OCLC 443476100.

== Bibliography ==
- (in Italian) Biagini, Antonello. Storia dell'Albania contemporanea. Bompiani editore. Milano, 2005
- (in Italian) Borgogni, Massimo. Tra continuità e incertezza. Italia e Albania (1914-1939). La strategia politico-militare dell'Italia in Albania fino all'Operazione "Oltre Mare Tirana" . 2007 Franco Angeli
- (in Italian) Bucciol, Eugenio. Albania: fronte dimenticato della Grande guerra. Nuova Dimensione Edizioni. Portogruaro, 2001 ISBN 88-85318-61-4
- Bushkoff, Leonard. Albania, history of. Collier's Encyclopedia. vol. 1. NY: P.F. Collier, L.P, 1996.
- Nigel, Thomas. Armies in the Balkans 1914-18. Osprey Publishing. Oxford, 2001 ISBN 1-84176-194-X
- Pearson, Owens. Albania in the twentieth century: a history (Volume 3). Publisher I.B.Tauris. London, 2004 ISBN 1-84511-013-7
- Steiner, Zara. The lights that failed: European international history, 1919-1933. Oxford University Press. Oxford, 2005.
- Stickney, Edith. Southern Albania. Stanford University Press. Stanford, 1929 ISBN 0-8047-6171-X
