= Avatar (newspaper) =

1967–1968 American underground newspaper

- Cover of the first issue of Avatar (1967)
- Type: Biweekly underground newspaper
- Format: newspaper
- Publisher: Trust Incorporated
- Editor: Brian Keating (issues 6 to 21)
- Founded: June 9, 1967
- Ceased publication: April 26, 1968
- Language: English
- Headquarters: Boston, Massachusetts

Avatar was an American underground newspaper published in Boston, Massachusetts, in 1967–1968. The newspaper's first issues were published from the headquarters of Broadside magazine in Cambridge.

== Publication history ==
Avatar was started by a varied group of people from different parts of the Boston countercultural scene, but quickly came to be dominated by Mel Lyman's group, the Fort Hill Community (or Lyman Family), which Lyman had formed over some years in Boston and Cambridge, and which has been variously described as a commune, family, or cult.

Over time, disputes between the Fort Hill Community and other factions involved in putting out the paper led to an irreconcilable split, which ended that cycle of the paper.

A total of 24 issues were printed bi-weekly from June 9, 1967, through April 26, 1968. Toward the end of its run, six issues (nos. 18–23) were published in large-size broadsheet newspaper format, with a tabloid size magazine insert. A 25th issue, dated May 9, 1968, was assembled and printed by the non-Fort Hill faction, but all but 500 copies of the 35,000-copy press run were sequestered and disposed of by the Fort Hill faction. Michael Kindman, founder of the East Lansing underground newspaper The Paper, briefly worked on Avatar and remained with the group for five years. He later wrote of his experiences, including his participation in the theft, in his book My Odyssey Through the Underground Press.

== Spin-offs ==
There were three short-lived spinoffs of Avatar:

- New York Avatar (7 issues, March 29 – August 1968) — edited by Brian Keating out of a SoHo loft and featuring contributions by Paul Williams and Peter Stafford of Crawdaddy magazine and underground cartoonist The Mad Peck. Print run of 7,500.
- Boston Avatar a.k.a. Avatar Vol. II (6 issues, July – August 1968) — edited by Dave Wilson of Broadside magazine who had also edited editions 1 to 5 of Avatar
- American Avatar (4 issues, October 1968 – Summer 1969) - published by the Fort Hill faction

== See also ==
- List of underground newspapers of the 1960s counterculture
