= Joyce Lussu =

Italian writer, translator and partisan (1912–1998)

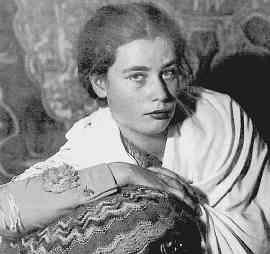
- Born: Gioconda Beatrice Salvadori Paleotti; 8 May 1912; Florence, Kingdom of Italy
- Died: 4 November 1998 (aged 86); Rome, Italy
- Occupations: Author, translator and anti-fascist activist
- Spouse(s): Aldo Belluigi; Emilio Lussu
- Children: Giovanni Lussu

Gioconda Beatrice Salvadori Paleotti (8 May 1912 – 4 November 1998), better known by the nickname Joyce Salvadori or by her married name Joyce Lussu, was an Italian writer, translator and partisan.

== Early life and education ==
She was born in Florence as Gioconda Beatrice Salvadori Paleotti to parents from the Marche of English origins. Her father, count Guglielmo "Willie" Salvadori Paleotti, was a positivist philosopher, Anglophile and aristocrat. As opponents of Italian fascism the family moved abroad. Joyce was educated according to the principles of Rudolf Steiner in Germany, France and Portugal before taking degrees in literature at the Sorbonne and in philology at Lisbon.

== Career ==
Her travels in Africa during the years 1933–1938 gave birth to environmentalist commitments; politically she was of the left and she became a member of the anti-fascist organization Giustizia e Libertà. In 1938 at age 25, she met 47-year-old Emilio Lussu, who was to be her companion, and later second husband, until his death in 1975. Together they participated in the Resistance, for which she was awarded the silver medal for military valour.

Her literary career, encouraged by Benedetto Croce, began in 1939 with the volume Liriche. In Fronti e frontiere she gave an account of the struggle in which she and Emilio Lussu had engaged during the Resistance. Sherlock Holmes, anarchici e siluri, a piece of Holmesian apocrypha, which she published in 1986, should also be mentioned. She was also a translator, above all of avant-garde literature from Asia and Africa. In particular she is known for her translations of the great Turkish poet Nazim Hikmet.

She continued her political activism, attending the First Congress of Differentiated Associations in Cagliari in 1951.

== Books ==
Her publications include:

- Fronti e frontiere
- Il libro delle streghe
- Il turco in Italia
- Tradurre poesia
- L'homme qui voulait naître femme: Mémoires féministes sur la guerre
- Trentaquattro poesie d'amore (I miti poesia)
- Tre poeti dell'Albania di oggi Migjeni Siliqi Kadare.

== Death ==
Joyce Lussu died in Rome on 4 November 1998 at the age of 86.

== Legacy ==
A museum dedicated to Joyce and Emilio was established in Armungia.
