= Emilio Lussu =

Italian writer and politician (1890–1975)

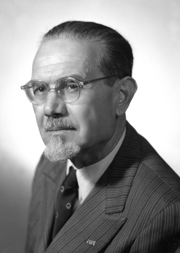
- Lussu in 1950s as senator

Minister for Post-War Assistance
- In office 21 June 1945 – 10 December 1945
- Prime Minister: Ferruccio Parri
- Preceded by: Office established
- Succeeded by: Luigi Gasparotto

Member of the Senate of the Republic
- In office 25 June 1953 – 4 June 1968
- Constituency: Sardinia
- In office 8 May 1948 – 24 June 1953 (Ex officio)

Member of the Constituent Assembly
- In office 25 June 1946 – 31 January 1948
- Constituency: Cagliari

Member of the Chamber of Deputies
- In office 11 June 1921 – 9 November 1926
- Constituency: Sardinia

Personal details
- Born: 4 December 1890 Armungia, Italy
- Died: 5 March 1975 (aged 84) Rome, Italy
- Party: PSd'Az (1921–1929); GeL (1929–1943); PdA (1943–1947); PSI (1947–1964); PSIUP (1964–1972)
- Other political affiliations: PSd'AzS
- Spouse: Joyce Lussu (1939–1975; his death)
- Children: Giovanni Lussu
- Occupation: Politician, writer, journalist, soldier

Emilio Lussu (4 December 1890 – 5 March 1975) was a Sardinian and Italian writer, anti-fascist intellectual, military officer, partisan, and politician. He is also the author of the novel One Year on the High Plateau. Lussu was elected multiple times to Parliament, serving as a member of the Constituent Assembly of Italy for the constituency of Cagliari and twice as a minister. He founded the Sardinian Action Party and co-founded the Justice and Freedom movement. As an anti-fascist, he was assaulted, wounded, and sent to confinement to Lipari in the Aeolian Islands by the Italian fascist regime as a direct decision of Benito Mussolini. After escaping, with Carlo Rosselli and Fausto Nitti, he spent about fourteen years as a refugee abroad. He served as an officer in World War I, where he received multiple decorations, and participated in the Spanish Civil War as a political leader and in the Italian Resistance.

== Biography ==
=== The soldier ===
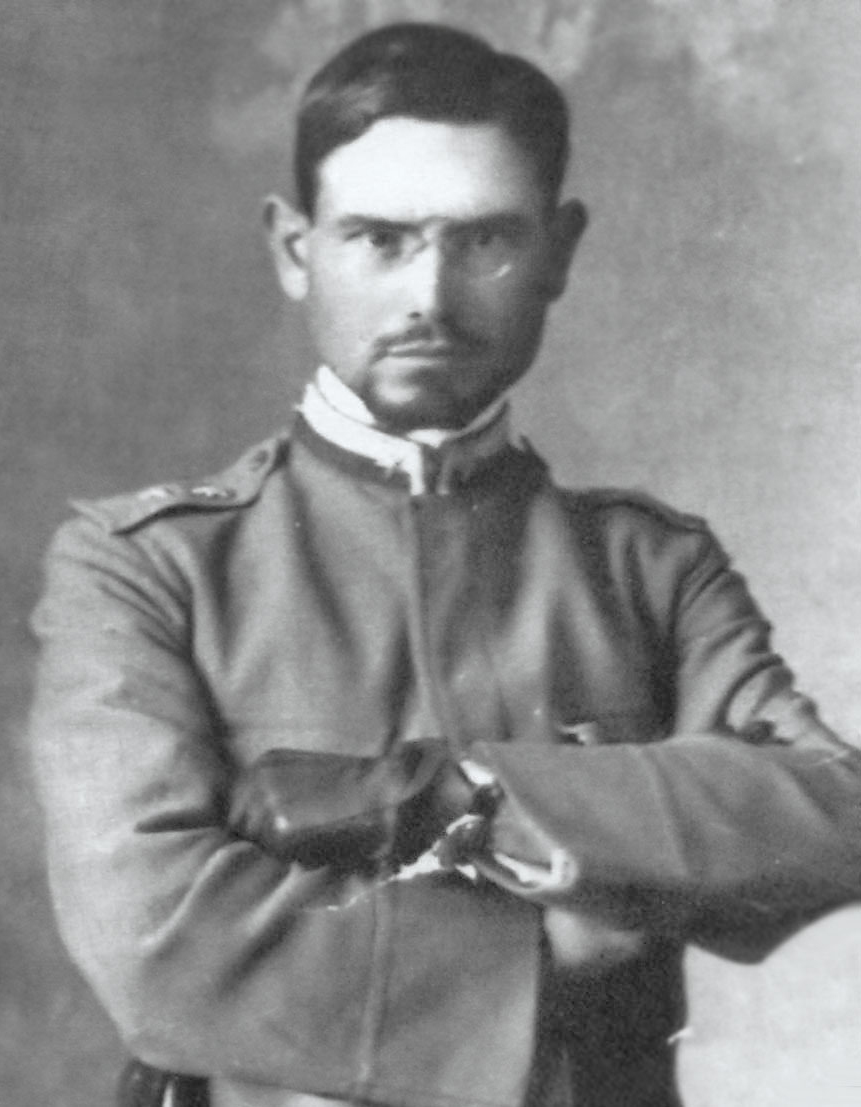
Lussu during World War I

Lussu was born in Armungia, province of Cagliari (Sardinia) and graduated with a degree in law in 1914. Lussu married Joyce Salvadori, a notable poet, and member of the noble Paleotti family of the Marche, who were counts of Fermo. Prior to the entry of Italy into World War I, Lussu joined the army and was involved in several skirmishes. As a complementary officer of the Brigade "Sassari" in 1916 he was stationed on the Asiago Plateau. The brigade had arrived on the plateau in May 1916 to help in the Italian effort to stop the Austrian Spring offensive. In the month of June 1916 the brigade conquered Monte Fior, Monte Castelgomberto, Monte Spil, Monte Miela and Monte Zebio. After the war Lussu published the novel "One Year on the High Plateau" (Un anno sull'altipiano) about his experiences of trench warfare on the Asiago Plateau. The 1970 movie Many Wars Ago ("Uomini contro") by Francesco Rosi is based on this book.

=== Politics and exile ===
After the war Lussu, together with Camillo Bellieni, founded the Partidu Sardu-Partito Sardo d'Azione (Sardinian Action Party), that blended social-democratic values and Sardinian nationalism. The party took a formal position in 1921, opposing the increasing power of the Fascist movement. Lussu was elected to the Italian parliament in 1921 and, in 1924 was among the Aventine secessionists who withdrew from the Italian Parliament after the murder of Giacomo Matteotti.

Lussu's anti-Fascist position was, at the time, one of the most radical in Italy. Lussu was physically attacked and injured by unknown aggressors several times. In 1926, during one of these attacks (notably, the same day that Benito Mussolini suffered an attack in Bologna), Lussu shot one of the squadristi (italian blackshirts), in self-defense. He was arrested and tried, being found non-guilty due to the right to self defense, only to be later sentenced (due to fascist political interference) to 5 years of confinement on the island of Lipari, within the Aeolian Islands near the northern coast of Sicily.

In 1929, Lussu escaped from his confinement and reached Paris. There, together with Gaetano Salvemini, Carlo Rosselli, Riccardo Bauer, Ernesto Rossi and other anti-fascist refugees he founded Giustizia e Libertà (Justice and Freedom), an anti-Fascist movement that proposed revolutionary methods to upset the Italian Fascist Regime. While in exile, he came to be known as "Mister Mills".

In 1938, Lussu's novel "One Year on the High Plateau" (Un anno sull'altipiano) was published in Paris. This thinly fictional account tells of the lives of soldiers during World War I and the trench warfare they encountered. One Year on the High Plateau underlines, with chill rationalism, how the irrationalities of warfare affected the common man. Gifted with a keen sense of observation and sharp logic, Lussu demonstrates how distant the real life of soldiers is from everyday activities. In a notable passage, he describes the silent terror in the moments preceding an attack, as he is forced to abandon the "safe" protective trench for an external unknown, risky, undefined world: "All the machine-guns are waiting for us".

=== Return to Italy ===
Lussu took part in the civil war in Spain. Between 1941 and 1942 he was the protagonist of the most important "episode" of the collaboration between British Special Operations Executive and Italian antifascism in exile. He tried to get the clearance for an antifascist uprising in his home island of Sardinia, which the SOE supported at some stage but did not receive approval from the Foreign Office.

Lussu returned to Italy after the armistice of 1943 when joined the Italian Resistance and became the secretary of the Sardinian Action Party for southern Italy. He became the leader of the left wing of the party and later joined forces with the Italian Socialist Party (PSI). After World War II, he served as the Minister for Post-War Assistance in the government of Ferruccio Parri and later as a minister without portfolio in Alcide De Gasperi's government. In 1964, Lussu separated from the PSI, creating the Italian Socialist Party of Proletarian Unity (PSIUP). Ideological differences with the political line of Partito Sardo d'Azione deepened and Lussu left Sardinia. Lussu died in Rome in 1975.

== Works ==
Many political meanings have been drawn from Lussu's works, but his works are perhaps more important at a personal level. Morally and philosophically, Lussu's books reflect his need to repent, having been previously an interventista (favourable to entering the war) and a revolutionary (in Giustizia e Libertà); his works soberly describe what war, in its cruellest moments, was like for him.

The alteration of Lussu's opinion of war is quite apparent in the range of his works: first an interventista, then the author of a manual for revolution, soon afterwards the author of a pacifist book, then again a revolutionary and a volunteer in the Spanish civil war. Anyway, One Year on the High Plateau combines well the repulse of the war with the bravery of the fighter. Lussu's consistency has been questioned and politics often invades evaluations of his works.

=== Bibliography ===
- La catena (The Chain, 1929)
- Marcia su Roma e dintorni (The March on Rome and Thereabouts, 1932)
- Teoria dell'insurrezione ("Theory of Insurrection", 1936)
- Per l'Italia dall'esilio (Road to Exile: The Story of a Sardinian Patriot, 1938) (August 3, 1936 review in Time magazine)
- Un anno sull'altipiano ("One Year on the High Plateau", Sassari Infantry Brigade, 1938, ISBN 978-1-85375-360-2; "A Soldier on the Southern Front", ISBN 978-0-8478-4278-0)
- Diplomazia clandestina (Clandestine Diplomacy, 1955)
- La clericalizzazione dello Stato e l'arcivescovo di Cagliari (The Clericalization of the State and the Archbishop of Cagliari, 1958)
- Il cinghiale del diavolo e altri scritti sulla Sardegna (The devil´s boar and other writings on Sardinia, 1976)

In the Florestano Vancini's film The Assassination of Matteotti (1973), Lussu is played by Giovanni Brusatori.

== Electoral history ==
Election	House	Constituency	Party	Votes	Result
1921	Chamber of Deputies	Sardinia	PSd'Az	—N/a	Elected
1924	Chamber of Deputies	Sardinia	PSd'Az	—N/a	Elected
1946	Constituent Assembly	Cagliari–Sassari–Nuoro	PdA	17,853	Elected
1953	Senate of the Republic	Sardinia – Cagliari	PSI	31,282	Elected
1958	Senate of the Republic	Sardinia – Cagliari	PSI	37,212	Elected
1963	Senate of the Republic	Sardinia – Iglesias	PSI	13,280	Elected

== Honours and awards ==
- Silver Medal of Military Valor (Col del rosso, January 28, 1918)
- Silver Medal of Military Valor (Campo d'argine, June 16, 1918)
- Bronze Medal of military Valor (Altipiano di Asiago, July 1916)
- Bronze Medal of military Valor (November 1916)
- War Merit Cross
- Commemorative Medal for the Italo-Austrian War 1915–1918
- Commemorative Medal of the Unity of Italy
- Order of Vittorio Veneto
- Medaglia commemorativa italiana della vittoria

== Sources ==
- Rossi, Umberto. (3 September 2005). "The Alcoholics of War: Experiencing Chemical and Ideological Drunkenness in Emilio Lussu's Un anno sull'altipiano", Mosaic 38:77–94.
- Media related to Emilio Lussu at Wikimedia Commons
