= Melette =

Mountain in Italy

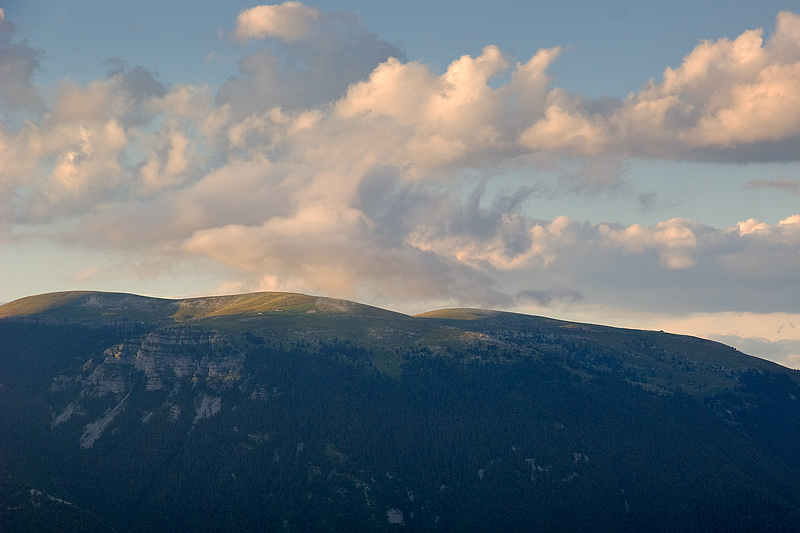
- Monte Fior

Highest point
- Elevation: 1,824 m (5,984 ft)

Geography
- Location: Veneto, Italy

Melette is a mountain massif in the Veneto region in Northern Italy. Located in the central-eastern part of the Sette Comuni plateau, its highest peak is 1,824 metres.

The main summits of the massif are:

- Monte Fior 1824 m
- Monte Spil 1808 m
- Monte Miela 1782 m
- Monte Castelgomberto 1771 m
- Monte Meletta Davanti 1704 m
- Monte Meletta di Gallio 1676 m
- Monte Tondarecar 1673 m
