= Mel Lyman =

American musician, writer, and commune founder (1938–1978)

- Born: March 24, 1938; Eureka, California, United States
- Died: March 1978 (age 39 or 40) exact location unknown
- Occupations: Musician; Leader, The Lyman Family

Melvin James Lyman (March 24, 1938 – March 1978) was an American musician and writer, and the founder of the Fort Hill Community, which has been variously described as a family, commune, or cult.

== Early life ==
Lyman grew up in California and Oregon. As a young man, according to the music newsletter The Broadside of Boston, he spent a number of years traveling the country and learning harmonica and banjo from such musicians as Brother Percy Randolph and Obray Ramsey.

During a period in the early 1960s, Lyman lived in New York City, where he associated with other artists, filmmakers, musicians, and writers. He was a friend of underground filmmaker Jonas Mekas, which led to the studios of Andy Warhol and Bruce Conner. He learned the art of filmmaking from Conner and made some films with him.

== Musician ==
Mel Lyman played harmonica like no one under the sun / Mel Lyman didn't just play harmonica, he was one. – Landis MacKellar

In 1963 Lyman joined Jim Kweskin’s Boston-based jug band as a banjo and harmonica player. Lyman, once called "the Grand Old Man of the 'blues' harmonica in his mid-twenties", is remembered in folk music circles for playing a 20-minute improvisation on the traditional hymn "Rock of Ages" at the end of the 1965 Newport Folk Festival to the riled crowd streaming out after Bob Dylan’s famous appearance with an electric band.

Some felt that Lyman, primarily an acoustic musician, was delivering a wordless counterargument to Dylan’s new-found rock direction. Irwin Silber, editor of Sing Out Magazine, wrote that Lyman’s "mournful and lonesome harmonica" provided "the most optimistic note of the evening".

== Writer ==
In 1966, supported and funded by Mekas, Lyman published his first book, Autobiography of a World Savior, which set out to reformulate spiritual truths and occult history in a new way. In 1971, Lyman published Mirror at the End of the Road, derived from letters he wrote during his formative years, starting in 1958 from his initial attempts to learn and become a musician, to the early 1960s as his life widened and deepened musically and personally. The final entries, from 1966, simply express the profound joys and deepest losses which defined and gave his life direction and meaning in the years to come. The key to the book and the life that he lived afterward are stated simply in the dedication at the beginning: "To Judy, who made me live with a broken heart". (Note: Referring to Judy Silver, Lyman's second wife, who left him in 1963.)

== The Lyman Family ==
=== The Fort Hill Community ===
It was his relationship with Judy Silver that brought him to Boston in 1963. Again, Lyman became acquainted with many artists and musicians in the vibrant Boston scene, including Timothy Leary's group of LSD enthusiasts, International Foundation for Internal Freedom (IFIF). Lyman was involved for a very short time and, against his wishes, so was Judy. Knowing LSD’s power, he felt she was not ready but stated "the bastards at IFIF gave her acid … I told her not to take it. I knew her head couldn't take it."

Lyman’s fears turned out to be justified and she left college and returned to her parents in Kansas. According to one of the anonymous sources interviewed by David Felton for Rolling Stone, "Judy got all fucked up – this is his second old lady – I mean like she got really twisted. I don't know if it was the acid or the scene or whatever, but she split. She went back to Kansas. She was totally out of the picture by the summer of 1963. Judy is probably the most important thing in Mel's life. He worshipped Judy, really loved her. Then she split, you know? She couldn't help it, she was totally freaked out. They took her away."

Lyman was by all accounts very charismatic and later, after Judy had left, a community tended to grow up around him. At some point Lyman began to view himself as destined for a role as a spiritual force and leader.

In 1966, Lyman founded and headed The Lyman Family, also known as The Fort Hill Community, centered in a few houses in the Fort Hill section of Roxbury, then a poor neighborhood of Boston. The Fort Hill Community, to observers in the mid-to-late Sixties, combined some of the outward forms of an urban hippie commune with a neo-transcendentalist socio-spiritual structure centered on Lyman, the friends he had attracted, and the large body of his music and writings. One of the stalwarts of the community was Jim Kweskin, Lyman’s former band mate.

Members of Lyman's Community briefly included the young couple Mark Frechette and Daria Halprin, two non-actors who had been discovered and cast by Italian director Michelangelo Antonioni for the lead roles in his second English-language feature Zabriskie Point. Michael Kindman, founder of the East Lansing underground newspaper The Paper, briefly worked on Avatar and remained with the group for five years. He later wrote of his experiences in his book My Odyssey Through the Underground Press.

Journalist and poet Paul Williams, founder of Crawdaddy rock magazine and author of Das Energi, spent a few months on Fort Hill. He told David Felton he had had to escape under cover of darkness after being told he would not be allowed to leave.

Although Lyman and the Family shared some attributes with the hippies – experimenting with LSD and marijuana and Lyman’s cosmic millennialism – they were not actually hippies; in fact, the ethos of the community was virulently anti-hippie. Female members dressed and behaved conservatively and male members wore their hair relatively short by the standards of the era. According to both Felton and Kindman, Lyman discouraged sexual activity and at least once ordered a pregnant member to get an abortion.

Couples were discouraged from spending private time together. Women were expected to be obedient and serve in domestic capacities only, while men were expected to dominate and control them. Members turned over whatever money they had to the Family. Funds were used to purchase houses in the Fort Hill area for members to live in, construction tools, and vehicles, along with sound and video recording equipment for Lyman's use. The community's primary activity was construction and remodeling work. The foremost goal was to provide a supportive environment for Lyman to do his creative work.

According to both Felton and Kindman, a macho, bullying ethic prevailed and guns were frequently brandished. Lyman seemed to believe that one could only be truly creative when one was "real" or "awake" – defined in practice as experiencing intense pain or anger – and that fear and cowardice caused one to remain "asleep" or even to die. People were subjected to rigid discipline and highly structured lives.

The Avatar

By the Spring of 1967 the Fort Hill Community had become an established presence in Boston and, along with members of the wider community in greater Boston and Cambridge, came together to create and publish the underground newspaper Avatar. It contained local news, political and cultural essays, commentary and more personal contributions, writing, and photography from various members of the Fort Hill Community, including Lyman. Throughout the first year of its existence, it cultivated a national audience and many more people visited Fort Hill at that time, some eventually staying and becoming part of the community.

Rather than the gentle and collectivist hippie ethic in other underground publications of the time, Lyman’s writing in Avatar espoused a philosophy that contained, to some readers of the time, strong currents of megalomania and nihilism and to others a powerful alternative voice to the prevailing ethos.

I am going to reduce everything that stands to rubble
and then I am going to burn the rubble
and then I am going to scatter the ashes
and then maybe SOMEONE will be able to see SOMETHING as it really is
WATCHOUT

— Mel Lyman, Declaration of Creation

In the Spring of 1968, after working very intensely on each issue, the Family gained complete editorial control of Avatar for the final issue of the paper. Later they founded their own magazine, American Avatar, which continued the editorial directions of the newspaper. Lyman’s writings in these publications brought increased visibility and public reaction, both positive and negative.

His writings, along with others in the publications, could be poetic, philosophical, humorous, and confrontational, sometimes simultaneously, as Lyman at various times claimed to be: the living embodiment of Truth, the greatest man in the world, Jesus Christ, and an alien entity sent to Earth in human form by extraterrestrials. Such pronouncements were typically delivered with extreme fervor and liberal use of ALL CAPS.

=== KPFK Debacle ===
According to both Felton and Kindman, Family member Owen deLong applied for and eventually got a job as program director at alternative community radio station KPFK in Los Angeles. Although he had not mentioned Lyman or American Avatar, deLong immediately began taking the station in what management and staff considered a peculiar direction. When Lyman's "history of rhythm and blues" tapes proved to have been recorded at a volume too low for quality broadcasting, deLong interrupted the third broadcast and asked listeners to call the station complaining about the sound.

The alacrity with which the switchboard lit up suggested a pre-planned campaign by Family members. When recording engineer David Cloud pointed this out, deLong assaulted him and was subsequently fired. Family members including Mark Frechette later came to the station ostensibly to remove some shelves they had installed, while verbally attacking station staff. The police were called and station manager Marvin Segelman hired a private security guard for the station for the next week. Family member George Peper confirmed to Felton that Lyman had ordered the attack.

=== Post-Manson Family ===
On The Dick Cavett Show in 1970, Mark Frechette said Lyman's group was not a commune: "It's a 'community', but the purpose of the community is not communal living. ... The community is for one purpose, and that's to serve Mel Lyman, who is the leader and the founder of that community."

In 1971, Rolling Stone magazine published an extensive cover exposé on the Family by associate editor David Felton. The Rolling Stone report described an authoritarian and dysfunctional environment, including an elite "Karma Squad" of ultra-loyalists to enforce Lyman’s discipline, the Family's predilection for astrology, and isolation rooms for disobedient Family members. Family members disputed these reports, but ex-members corroborated much of them, especially Michael Kindman in My Odyssey Through the Underground Press.

The only difference between us and the Manson Family is that we don't go around preaching peace and love and we haven't killed anyone, yet.

— Jim Kweskin, perhaps in jest

The Rolling Stone article appeared less than two years after the arrest of Charles Manson and members of the Manson Family for several murders. Lyman seemed to share some traits in common with Manson, which raised the Family’s profile and established Lyman in the public mind as a bizarre and possibly dangerous person.

In 1973, members of the Family, including Frechette, staged a bank robbery. One member of the Family was killed by police, and Frechette, sentenced to prison, died in a weightlifting accident in jail in 1975.

Unlike the Manson Family, Lyman’s did not explode in a dramatic denouement. Rather, the Family took a lower profile and carried on, quietly building on the relationships formed in the turbulent early years.

=== Growing up in The Family ===
Another description of life in the Lyman Family comes from actress and screenwriter Guinevere Turner who spent her first eleven years (1968–1979) in the family, being expelled after her mother, who lived apart from her, escaped. According to Turner, by 1968 there were a hundred adults and sixty children in the family living "under the reign" of Lyman, "a charismatic, complicated leader". They were taught that outsiders lacked souls and were dangerous to be around. Doctors were called only in emergencies. The family had homes in Kansas, Los Angeles, San Francisco, New York, Boston, and Martha’s Vineyard, each with a house for adults and one for children. Children were homeschooled.

While Turner had fond memories of camaraderie among the children, she describes punishment for children as severe, including "being locked in a closet for a whole day, or being deprived of food, or being beaten while everyone else was brought out to watch, or being the object of shunning, when no one was allowed to look at you or talk to you for days."

Turner states that around the age of thirteen and fourteen, girls were often chosen for "marriage" by one of the adult men of the family. She witnessed a friend crying after being "chosen" for Lyman, saying "that she didn’t want to have sex with Lyman but knew that soon she would have to". Turner also states that the group believed "the world would end on January 5, 1974", and that Family members should prepare to be taken to Venus via UFO: when this did not occur, members whose "souls weren't ready" were blamed for having kept Lyman from participating in the ascension.

As an adult, Turner was invited to return to the Family and spent several days visiting them before going away to college. She relates feeling "a surge of love and belonging" in the compound before being alienated by the traditional gender roles. Realizing she had no place among them, she left for good.

== Death ==
In the mid-1980s, members of the Fort Hill Community announced that Lyman had died in 1978, age 40. However, as writer Ryan Walsh notes, the community "never presented a death certificate, provided details about how he went, or disclosed what they did with his remains. There was no legal investigation."

A member of the Fort Hill Community, speaking to Walsh under condition of anonymity, said that Lyman "purposefully overdosed on drugs in Los Angeles, California, sometime in 1978" following a long illness.

After Lyman’s death, the Family evolved into a smaller, more conventional extended family. The skills acquired in refurbishing the structures of the Family compound led to the founding of the Fort Hill Construction Company.

== Publications ==
- Lyman, Mel. Autobiography of a World Savior (New York, Jonas Press, 1966)
- Lyman, Mel. Mirror at the End of the Road (American Avatar, 1971) (Distributed by Ballantine Books)
- Avatar writings: see Articles & Columns by Mel Lyman, Avatar 1967-68, American Avatar 1968-69 at Steve Trussel's Mel Lyman archive.
- Other writings: see Indexes to columns, articles, etc. at Steve Trussel's Mel Lyman archive.
- Celebrated essayist Bruce Chatwin wrote about the Fort Hill Community in “The Lyman Family – A Story” in his book What Am I Doing Here? (Picador, 1989). Entire essay reprinted at Steve Trussel's Mel Lyman archive. Trussel includes a page of annotations explaining that many of Chatwin's claims are extreme and don't match the facts.

== Discography ==
- American Avatar: Love Comes Rolling Down, (Warner Bros./Reprise 6353, 1970)
- Jim Kweskin’s America, (Warner Bros.Reprise Records 6464, 1971), producer (as Richard D. Herbruck) and performer.
- Lyman appeared as an instrumentalist on various tracks of other albums. See Mel Lyman: Recorded Music for complete list.
