= Mario Grigorov =

Bulgarian composer and concert pianist

- Occupation: Composer
- Website: https://www.mariogrigorov.com/

Mario Grigorov is a Bulgarian composer for film and television and a concert pianist. He performs on the piano and improvises in the styles of jazz, classical and world music.

Mario Grigorov's father was a concert trumpeter, and his mother was a concert pianist. In 1968, the Sofia Conservatorium suspended its age requirement of seven years of age to allow a 5-year-old Grigorov to begin his classical studies. In 1969, Mario's father took the opportunity to play in the Shah's handpicked orchestra, and the family relocated for 6 years. Mario's tutelage in classical piano continued, and he was exposed to the sounds of the new culture he found himself surrounded by.

In 1976, again for Mr. Grigorov's symphony career, the family relocated to East Germany. While finishing out the 1970s with a classical regimen, Grigorov and his family moved to Vienna, where Mario studied under renowned 20th-century composer Thomas Christian David at the Vienna Conservatorium. In the early 1980s, Mario moved to Sydney, Australia, where he took electronic music and Jazz studies classes with Don Burrows. He worked with many Australian rock groups. He has lived in Iran, Austria, Australia, Bulgaria, Germany, and the US, and now resides between Berlin and London.

== Career ==
=== Personal Music ===
Grigorov began composing for television, commercials, and film in Sydney, Australia. In 1992, Miles Goodman, a film composer, helped Mario relocate to the United States. Three days after Grigorov's move to Los Angeles, an A&R executive from Warner Bros. Records, Bob James, heard him improvising in a music store and signed him to his first major-label recording contract. Grigorov then recorded his debut album, Rhymes with Orange. Grigorov toured the album in Europe and North America, supporting musicians such as Wynton Marsalis, Joshua Redman, Charlie Haden, and Béla Fleck.

Astor Place Records released his second album, Aria, a collaboration with Paul Schwartz, on 14 October 1997. Aria was a darker crossover with funk along with operatic themes from Carmen, The Magic Flute, Madame Butterfly and Dido and Aeneas. The album reached No. 4 on Billboard’s Top Classical Crossover chart.

=== Music for the Screen ===
In 2000, Grigorov began composing music for screen in the United States. He is most recognized for his musical scores on films by director Lee Daniels. They worked together on Shadowboxer (2005), Tennessee (2008), Precious (2009) and The Paperboy (2012). In 2005, he opened his own commercial music company, Siblings Music, Inc.. Siblings existed from 2005 - 2010, creating original music for the moving picture. In 2011, he wrote the score for Patang by Indian director Prashant Bhargava which premiered at that year's Berlin International Film Festival.

In 2014 Mario met with director David Yates, and they worked together on Yates' film Fantastic Beasts and Where to Find Them. Mario Grigorov composed and co-wrote an original song, "Blind Pig", with J. K. Rowling, which was performed by Emmi.

=== Music for Television ===
As a television film composer, he wrote the musical score for Lifetime’s 2014 made-for-television films, Flowers in the Attic and Petals on the Wind. He continued to work with Lifetime on several other television movies, including Harry and Meghan: A Royal Romance.

Mario also has provided the music for several documentaries, including Third Wave: A Volunteer Story, presented by Sean Penn, the Anna Halprin biographical film Breath Made Visible by filmmaker Ruedi Gerber, and the war documentary Taxi to the Dark Side by Alex Gibney, which won a 2008 Academy Award for Best Documentary.

=== Art Work ===
As well as being a composer and performer, Mario Grigorov is also an artist and creates two-handed symmetrical drawings. He combined his drawing style with his piano playing to develop an experimental type of keyboard play known as Mirror Tones.

=== Awards and recognition ===
In 2013, he won 'Best Music Feature' at the Massachusetts Independent Film Festival for his work on Susan Seidelman's Musical Chairs.

== Filmography ==
- Glass (1989)
- Fear in America (1992 TV Movie documentary)
- This Won't Hurt a Bit (1993)
- A Song for You (1993 Short)
- Young at Hearts (1994)
- Edge City (1998)
- Razor's Edge (1999 Short)
- Here (2001 Short)
- 29 Palms (2002)
- Grasp (2002 Short)
- The Life Jacket Is Under Your Seat (2002)
- The Americans (2004 Short)
- Rescue? (2004 Short)
- Shadowboxer (2005)
- The Insurgents (2006)
- The Third Wave (2007 Documentary)
- Feathers to The Sky (2007 Short)
- The Attic (2007 Video)
- Tennessee (2008)
- Accelerating America (2008 Documentary)
- Ten: Thirty One (2008 Short)
- Precious (2009)
- War Against The Weak (2009 Documentary)
- Breath Made Visible: Anna Halprin (2009 Documentary)
- Jackson Parish (2009 Short original music)
- Devoted to Dance (2010 Documentary)
- Oprah & Tyler: A Project of Passion (2010 Video documentary, short, original score music)
- From Push to Precious (2010 Video documentary, short, original score music)
- A Precious Ensemble (2010 Video documentary, short, original score music)
- Malice N Wonderland (2010 Video short)
- The Hopes & Dreams of Gazza Snell (2010)
- Seniors Rocking (2010 Documentary short)
- Patang (2011 TV Series) (5 Episodes)
- Untitled Jersey City Project (2011 TV Series) (5 episodes)
- Musical Chairs (2011)
- Off-Ramp (2011 Short)
- Beyond (2012)
- The Paperboy (2012)
- The Anderson Monarchs (2012 Documentary)
- 59 Middle Lane (2012 Documentary)
- Trauma Team (2012)
- Crazy Kind of Love (2013)
- Stay at Home (2013 Short) (co-composer)
- Our Boys (2013)
- Dracula: The Dark Prince (2013)
- Flowers in The Attic (2014 TV Movie) (music by)
- Squatters (2014 Video)
- Flowers in The Attic 2: Petals on The Wind (2014 TV Movie) (music by)
- Out in the Night (2014 Documentary)
- Seasons of Love (2014 TV Movie)
- Out in the Night (2015)
- P.O.V. (2015 TV Series documentary) (1 episode)
- Harry Benson: Shoot First (2016 Documentary)
- The Best Democracy Money Can Buy (2016 Documentary)
- The Evil Within (2017)
- Another Mother's Son (2017)
- Gnaw (2017)
- Harry & Meghan: A Royal Romance (2018 TV Movie)
- The Conversation (2018)
- No Shame (Short) (2018)
- Look Away (2018)
- Wheels (2018)
- Totengebet (2019 TV Movie)
- Escaping The Madhouse: The Nellie Bly Story (2019 TV Movie)
- Harry & Meghan: Becoming Royal (2019 TV Movie)
- The Dare (2019 completed)
- Kill Chain (2019) (5 episodes)
- Penumbral (2019 Short)
- Line of Descent (2019 Indian film released on ZEE5) (2019)
- Spides (2020 TV Series) (8 episodes)
- White Knight (2021 post-production)
- Lair (2021 pre-production)
- Vigilantes, Inc. (2024) documentary.
- Nord Nord Mord - Sievers und der verlorene Hund (2024)

== Discography ==
- Squatters, 2019
- The Absence of Presence, 2019
- Hello Big Shot, 2019
- War Against the Weak, 2019
- Harry and Meghan: A Royal Romance, 2018
- Ragtime to Shine, 2018
- The Presence of Absence, 2018
- Atomic Lounge, 2017
- Paris to Cuba, 2009
- Rhymes with Orange, 1994

== Notable Concerts ==
- "Chamber Music in Historic Sights" Los Angeles, CA
- Stereophile Show Waldford Astoria New York, NY
- Clifford Brown Jazz Festival
- Quebec Jazz Festival
- Toronto Jazz Festival
- Edmonton Jazz festival, Shocton Theatre Edmonton, Alberta
- Victoria Jazz Festival Art Gallery of Greater Victoria
- Saskatoon Jazz Festival Saskatoon, Saskatchewan
- Saratoga Jazz Festival Saraoga, NY
- Montreal Jazz Festival Dy Maurier Hall Montreal, Quebec
- Newport Jazz Festival
- San Jose Jazz Festival San Jose Museum of Art San Jose, CA
- Santa FE Chamber Festival Santa FE, NM
- Contemporary Arts Center New Orleans, LA
- Performing Arts Center Calgary, Alberta
- Hirshorn Museum Washington, Dc
