= Alonei Yitzhak =

Alonei Yitzhak: אַלּוֹנֵי יִצְחָק (Hebrew)

Hebrew transcription(s)
  - Official: Allone Yizhaq
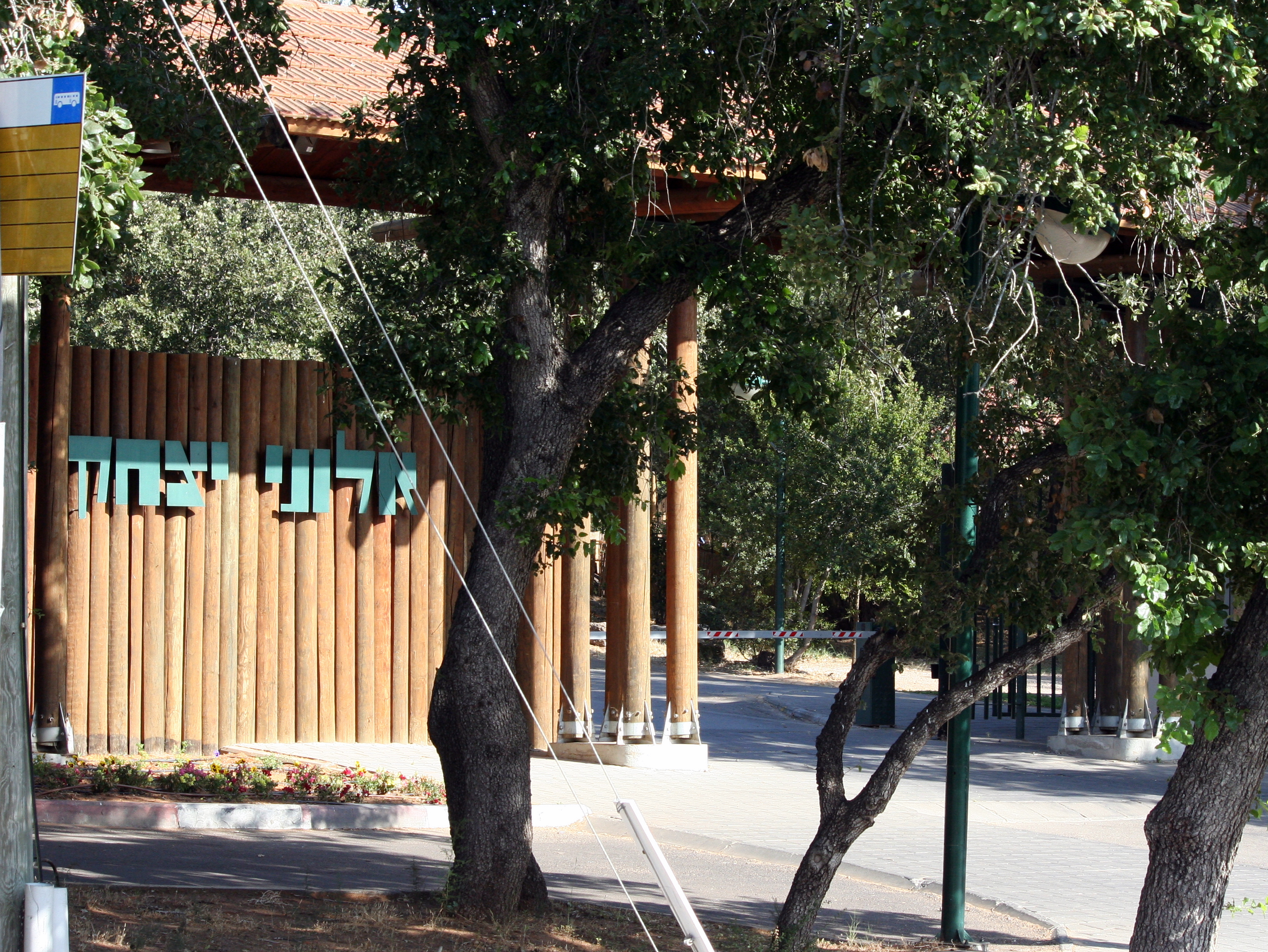
- Etymology: Yitzhak Oaks
- Location within Haifa region of Israel Location within Israel
- Coordinates: 32°30′36″N 35°0′19″E
- Country: Israel
- District: Haifa
- Subdistrict: Hadera
- Council: Menashe
- Founded: 1948
- Founder: Yehiel Harif
- Population (2024): 95
- Website: www.a-y.org.il

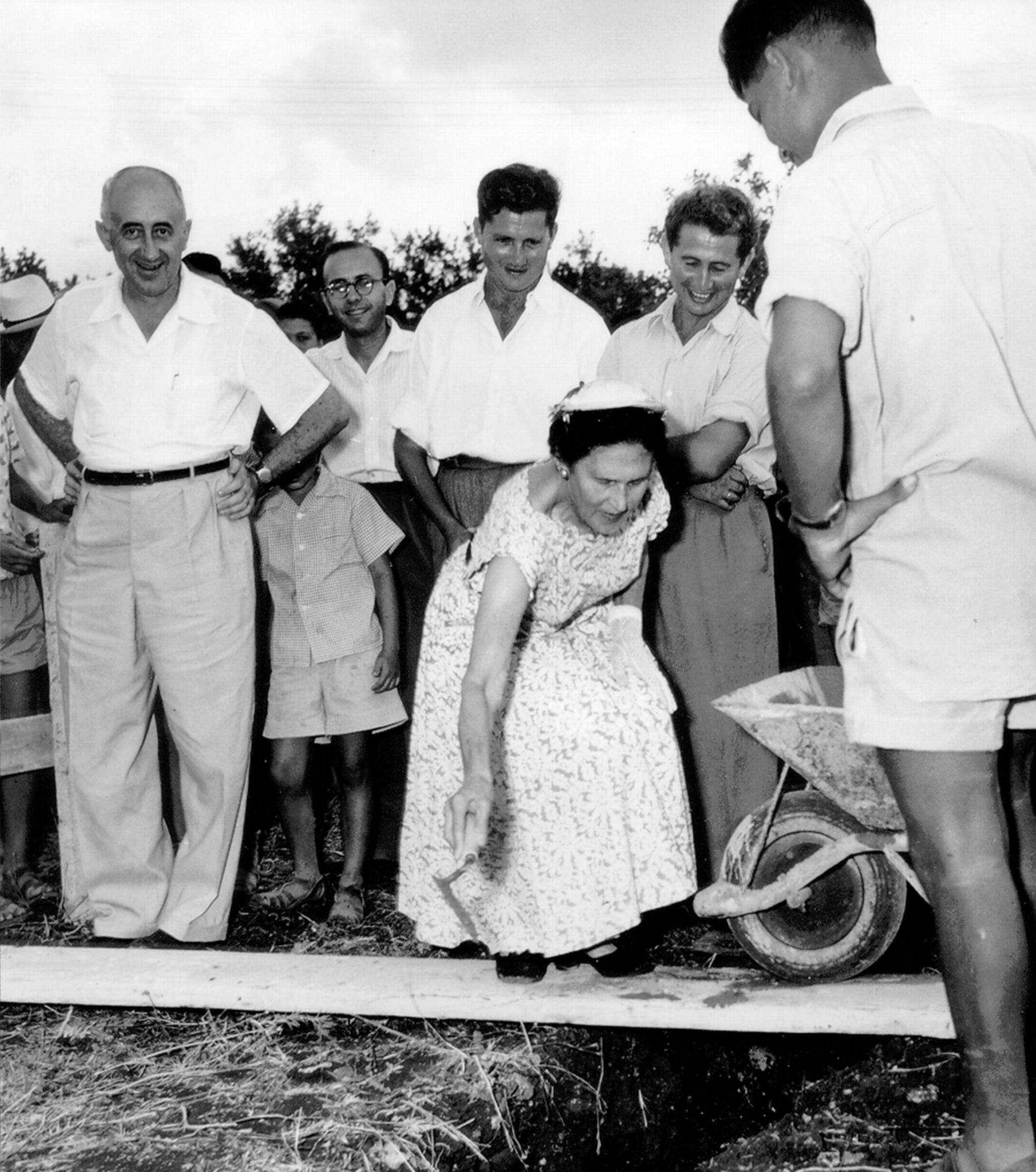
Foundation stone laying ceremony with Rose Halperin in Alonei Yitzhak in 1950

Alonei Yitzhak (Hebrew: אַלּוֹנֵי יִצְחָק, lit. 'Yitzhak Oaks') is a youth village in northern Israel. Located near Binyamina, it falls under the jurisdiction of Menashe Regional Council. In 2024 it had a population of 95.

== History ==
The village was established in 1948 by Yehiel Harif to absorb children who had survived the Holocaust. It was named after Yitzhak Gruenbaum, Jewish-Zionist journalist and activist, one of the leading figures in Polish Jewry. Today the village is a boarding school that teaches 675 students from 7th to 12th grade, comprising 275 residential pupils and 400 day students commuting from nearby towns such as Binyamina and Givat Ada. The diverse residential student body includes native Israelis alongside immigrant youth arriving through Youth Aliyah programs from Ukraine, Russia, North and South America, and Western Europe. The village operates as a comprehensive educational campus headed by Yaakov Benbenisti, a graduate of the institution himself.

The village integrates formal education with therapeutic and community-oriented activities, including sports, arts, music, leadership training, and peer mediation. Emphasizing independence and mutual responsibility, the village operates on a model inspired by traditional kibbutz values; students dedicate seven hours a week to various work roles and maintenance tasks around the campus.

The institution maintains high performance standards, with reports indicating a 91% secondary education certification (Bagrut) rate among its students in 2018. Furthermore, approximately 97% of the village's graduates transition into service within the Israel Defense Forces (IDF) or national service, with many subsequently pursuing higher education.

== Alonei Yitzhak nature reserve ==
A 31-acre nature reserve within which the Village is located was declared in 1969, mainly of old Valonia oak trees (Quercus macrolepis), near to the youth village. Other flora in the oak forest includes Cyclamen persicum, Calicotome villosa, Ephedra, Sea Squill, and Asphodelus microcarpus.

The reserve serves as a rare remnant of the "Park Forest" that once characterized the Sharon and Samaria regions. It features a diverse undergrowth and climbing flora, such as Common Smilax (Smilax aspera) and Clematis cirrhosa, alongside Storax (Styrax officinalis) and Palestine Buckthorn (Rhamnus lycioides). During the winter and spring, the area is noted for its flowering season, which includes Anemones, Persian Cyclamens, and several species of wild orchids, such as the Butterfly Orchid (Anacamptis papilionacea). A short, circular hiking trail, partially accessible, winds through the site, which is integrated into the Menashe Biosphere Reserve.
