= Lawrence Halprin =

American landscape architect, designer and teacher (1916–2009)

- Born: July 1, 1916; New York City, U.S.
- Died: October 25, 2009 (aged 93); Kentfield, California, U.S.
- Education: Cornell University (BS); University of Wisconsin–Madison (MS); Harvard University (BLA)
- Occupation: Architect
- Spouse: Anna Halprin (m. 1940)
- Children: 2, including Daria Halprin
- Mother: Rose Halprin
- Relatives: Ruthanna Hopper (granddaughter); Dennis Hopper (former-son-in-law)
- Practice: Lawrence Halprin & Associates
- Projects: Sproul Plaza; Ira Keller Fountain; Lovejoy Fountain Park; Freeway Park; Franklin Delano Roosevelt Memorial

Lawrence Halprin (July 1, 1916 – October 25, 2009) was an American landscape architect, designer and teacher.

Beginning his career in the San Francisco Bay Area in 1949, Halprin often collaborated with a local circle of modernist architects on relatively modest projects. These figures included William Wurster, Joseph Esherick, Vernon DeMars, Mario J. Ciampi, and others associated with the University of California, Berkeley. Gradually accumulating a regional reputation in the northwest, Halprin first came to national attention with his work the Century 21 Exposition, the Ghirardelli Square adaptive-reuse project in San Francisco, and the Nicollet Mall project in Minneapolis. Halprin's career proved influential to an entire generation in his specific design solutions, his emphasis on user experience to develop those solutions, and his collaborative design process.

Halprin's point of view and practice are summarized in his definition of modernism:

To be properly understood, Modernism is not just a matter of cubist space but of a whole appreciation of environmental design as a holistic approach to the matter of making spaces for people to live.... Modernism, as I define it and practice it, includes and is based on the vital archetypal needs of human being as individuals as well as social groups.

In his best work, he construed landscape architecture as narrative.

== Background ==
Halprin was born in Brooklyn, New York on July 1, 1916, the son of Zionist leader Rose Halprin and Samuel W. Halprin, where he also grew up. As a schoolboy, he earned acclaim playing sandlot baseball. He credited his parents with introducing him to art and supporting his artistic inclinations. His mother, in particular, brought him along on her weekly shopping trips to Macy's, after which they would visit the Metropolitan Museum of Art. Being Jewish, after finishing Poly Prep at 16, he went to Israel on a kibbutz for three years near what is today the Israeli port city of Haifa.

He earned a Bachelor of Science degree in 1939 at Cornell University, studying horticulture with Professor Lee Gand; he continued his studies at the University of Wisconsin, where he earned a Master of Science. While at Wisconsin, his wife Anna convinced Halprin to visit Taliesin, Frank Lloyd Wright's studio in Wisconsin, which in turn sparked Halprin's initial interest in architecture; after he left Talesin, he went to the school library, where he found and was inspired by Christopher Tunnard's Gardens in the Modern Landscape. Returning to school the following Monday, he spoke with the department head of horticulture, who directed him to the landscape architecture group upstairs, where he met Professor Franz Aust. After two weeks, Professor Aust recommended he continue his studies at the Harvard Graduate School of Design. There, he earned a second bachelor's degree (in landscape architecture, awarded 1942), where his professors included architects Walter Gropius and Marcel Breuer. Although Tunnard was teaching at Harvard, he never took a course from him. His Harvard classmates included Catherine Bauer, Philip Johnson, I.M. Pei, and William Wurster.

== Career ==
In 1944, Halprin was commissioned in the United States Navy as a lieutenant (junior grade). He was assigned to the destroyer USS Morris in the Pacific, which was struck by a kamikaze attack. After surviving the destruction of the Morris, Halprin was sent to San Francisco on leave.

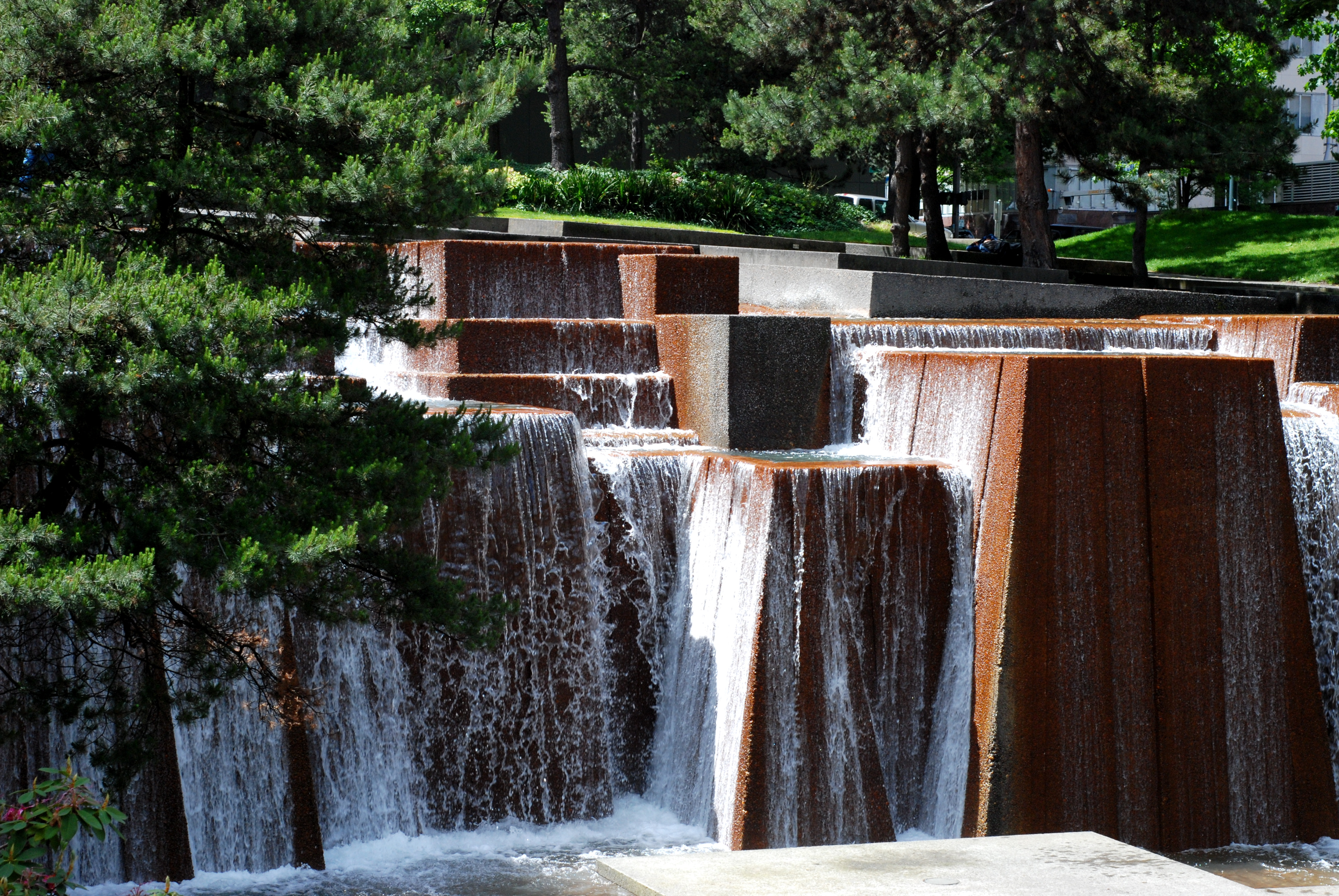
Ira Keller Fountain in Portland, Oregon

After his discharge from military service, Halprin joined the firm of San Francisco landscape architect Thomas Dolliver Church. He had become close to the Wursters during their year at Harvard, and Bill Wurster asked him to stop by if he was ever in California. While visiting Wurster's office, he passed by Church's office, which was on the first floor of the same building; Wurster, who was absent at the time, told his associates to hire Halprin if Church would not. When Halprin introduced himself to Church, he was hired immediately and told "I'm going to pay you more than usual, but I don't want you to come back every two seconds and ask for more money." The projects he worked on in this period included the Dewey Donnell Garden in Sonoma County.

Halprin opened his own office in 1949, becoming one of Church's professional heirs and competitors. His first commission was for Anna's parents, who had recently moved from Chicago; that project was a collaboration with Wurster (Schuman House, Woodside), who was responsible for the house's architecture. At its largest, during the BART landscaping project, Lawrence Halprin & Associates employed 80.

I have always felt that design is a total involvement and that it is not purely visual. The process for me has always been inextricably intertwined with the results. [...]
You can view process as a way to arrive at a solution, in which case it is a means towards an end or you can perceive it as important and valid in itself — full of twisting and turning, unknown explorations, reactive to many different inputs and influences and lacking a clear image of what the end product is or should be. What emerges then is, in fact, part of the process. [...] It is really more like life itself — unforeseen, adventurous, exploratory: with only two fixed points — a beginning and an end but even those linked up with larger changes.
It is in this way — a holistic way — that I have designed.

— Lawrence Halprin, quoted in Contemporary Architects (1980)

Halprin's work is marked by his attention to human scale, user experience, and the social impact of his designs, in the egalitarian tradition of Frederick Law Olmsted. Halprin was the creative force behind the interactive, 'playable' civic fountains most common in the 1970s, an amenity which continues to greatly contribute to the pedestrian social experience in Portland, Oregon, where "Ira's Fountain" is loved and well-used, and the United Nations Plaza in San Francisco. Park Central Square (1974; Springfield, Missouri) was the first of his works to be listed on the National Register of Historic Places (NRHP), in 2010, followed by the Heritage Park Plaza in Fort Worth, Texas, designed by Hrlprin and built in 1980, featured by NRHP as its featured listing of the week, on May 21, 2010.

From 1984 to 2002, Halprin designed and created the Armon Hanatziv Promenade in Jerusalem. He also designed several other notable buildings in Jerusalem including the Israel Museum and the Hadassah Medical Center.

Halprin's final three projects were all completed in 2005: the Letterman Digital Arts Center (for George Lucas), the approach to Yosemite Falls, and the amphitheatre at Stern Grove.

Several of Halprin's works have been threatened by redevelopment as they have aged. Some, such as the Water Garden in Olympia, Washington, have fallen victim to neglect and deferred maintenance, and are in states of disrepair. Others have attracted undesired users (homeless, drug users, and skateboarders); rather than address the social issues, some spaces, such as Skyline Park in Denver, completed in 1976, were redesigned (2003) to increase public usership. Critics argue his pieces have become dated and no longer reflect the direction their cities want to take. Budgetary constraints and the urge to "revitalize" threaten some of his projects. In response foundations have been set up to improve care for some of the sites and to try to preserve them in their original state. Prior to its destruction, Skyline Park was documented as Colorado's first Historic American Landscapes Survey project.

== Personal life ==
Halprin and his wife, accomplished avant-garde dancer Anna Halprin (née Schuman), were married in 1940. The couple were long-time collaborators; together, they explored the common areas between choreography and the way users move through a public space. They have two daughters: Daria Halprin, an American psychologist, author, dancer, and actress, and Rana Halprin, a photographer and activist for Romani and human rights. He died in Kentfield, California, on October 25, 2009, at the age of 93.

Anna and Lawrence Halprin co-created the "RSVP cycles", a creative methodology that can be applied broadly across all disciplines.

== Projects ==
Halprin's range of projects demonstrates his vision of the garden or open space as a stage. Halprin recognized that "the garden in your own immediate neighborhood, preferably at your own doorstep, is the most significant garden;" and as part of a seamless whole, he valued "wilderness areas where we can be truly alone with ourselves and where nature can be sensed as the primeval source of life." The interplay of perspectives informed projects which encompassed urban parks, plazas, commercial and cultural centers and other places of congregation:

Selected list of landscape projects by Halprin
Title	Image	City	State	Year (Note: Year completed)	Role / Notes
Ferris House		Spokane	WA	1955	Landscape
Washington Water Power (Note: Now Avista Corporation)		Spokane	WA	1959	Campus
West Coast Memorial to the Missing of World War II		San Francisco	CA	1960	Landscaping plan, located at the Presidio
1962 Seattle World's Fair		Seattle	WA	1962	Master landscaping plan
Sproul Plaza		Berkeley	CA	1962	At the University of California, Berkeley
Saint Francis Square		San Francisco	CA	1964	Cooperative housing project; design based on a pedestrian-oriented site plan, with three-story apartment buildings facing onto three landscaped interior courtyards
Sea Ranch, California		Sea Ranch	CA	1964	Master landscape plan; this is a historically significant planned community collaboration with developer Al Boeke and architects Joseph Esherick, Charles Willard Moore and others,
Ghirardelli Square		San Francisco	CA	1965	An early model for adaptive reuse of historic buildings.
Capitol Towers		Sacramento	CA	1965	Privately sponsored urban redevelopment.
Bay Area Rapid Transit		San Francisco	CA	1966	Master landscape planning for sections of the system, including station plazas.
Oakbrook Center		Oak Brook	IL	1966	Landscape work
Innerbelt Freeway		Akron	OH	1966	Plan proposed for a park atop the freeway in 1966.
Northwest Plaza		St. Louis	MO	1968	Exterior landscaping and 'horsehead' fountain scheme.
Nicollet Mall		Minneapolis	MN	1968	One of the nation's first transitways
Cascade Plaza		Akron	OH	1969	
Park Central Square		Springfield	MO	1970	
Ira Keller Fountain and Lovejoy Fountain Park		Portland	OR	1971	Part of a multi-block sequence of public fountains and outdoor rooms in Portland, known as the Halprin Open Space Sequence and listed on the National Register of Historic Places
Transit Mall		Portland	OR	1971	In Downtown Portland
Water Garden		Olympia	WA	1972	At the north plaza of the Employment Security Building. Permanently shut down and drained in the late 1980s due to leaks and cracked foundations.
Skyline Park		Denver	CO	1974	Inspired by Colorado National Monument; largely destroyed following 2003 redesign.
United Nations Plaza		San Francisco	CA	1975	Part of the Civic Center complex.
Sculpture Garden at the Virginia Museum of Fine Arts		Richmond	VA	1975	Demolished in 2006.
Manhattan Square Park		Rochester	NY	1975	5-acre (20,000 m^{2}) urban park with waterfalls, playground and skating rink
Riverbank Park		Flint	MI	1975	
Freeway Park		Seattle	WA	1976	Innovative reclaiming of interstate right-of-way for park space
Plaza 8 Water Feature		Sheboygan	WI	1976	Adjacent to the Mead Public Library, 8th Street
Downtown Mall		Charlottesville	VA	1976	8-9 block pedestrian only zone along the city's historic main street
Main Street		Greenville	SC	1979	Redesigned in 2008.
Heritage Park Plaza		Fort Worth	TX	1980	
Levi's Plaza		San Francisco	CA	1982	
Library Steps		Los Angeles	CA	1989	Public art and architectural installation of a 20-foot wide double stairway flanking a river rock "stream" that cascades down to a fountain with concrete seating. Halprin incorporated Robert Graham's Source Figure sculpture and pool as the symbolic "source" of his Library Steps which terminate at the Los Angeles Public Library entrance. Commonly known as the Bunker Hill Steps.
Grand Hope Park		Los Angeles	CA	1993	
Franklin Delano Roosevelt Memorial		Washington, D.C.		1997	
Letterman Digital Arts Center		San Francisco	CA	2005	
Approach to Yosemite Falls		Yosemite National Park	CA	2005	Loop-trail approach (and associated stonework) to Lower Yosemite Fall, with views of Upper Yosemite Fall
Stern Grove Amphitheater		San Francisco	CA	2005	

== Awards ==
- 1964 AIA Medal for Allied professionals
- 1969 Elected fellow in the American Society of Landscape Architects
- 1970 Elected honorary fellow of the Institute of Interior Design
- 1978 American Society of Landscape Architects Medal
- 1979 Thomas Jefferson Foundation Medal in Architecture
- 1979 Gold Medal for Distinguished Achievement awarded by the AIA
- 1987 Elected into the National Academy of Design
- 2002 National Medal of Arts
- 2002 Friedrich Ludwig von Sckell Golden Ring
- 2003 ASLA Design Medal
- 2005 Michaelangelo Award

== Publications ==
- A Life Spent Changing Places (2011) ISBN 978-0-8122-4263-8
- The Sea Ranch: Diary of an Idea (2003) ISBN 1-888931-23-X
- The FDR Memorial: Designed by Lawrence Halprin (1998) ISBN 1-888931-11-6
- The Franklin Delano Roosevelt Memorial (1997) ISBN 0-8118-1706-7
- "Design as a Value System", Places: Vol. 6: No. 1 (1989)
- Lawrence Halprin: Changing Places (1986) ISBN 0-918471-06-0
- Ecology of Form (audio book) (1982) ISBN 1-85035-074-4
- Sketchbooks of Lawrence Halprin (1981) ISBN 4-89331-701-6
- Lawrence Halprin (Process Architecture) (1978)
- Taking Part: A Workshop Approach to Collective Creativity (with Jim Burns) (1974) ISBN 0-262-58028-4
- Lawrence Halprin: Notebooks 1959–1971 (1972) ISBN 0-262-08051-6
- The RSVP cycles; creative processes in the human environment. (1970, c1969) ISBN 0-8076-0557-3
- Freeways (1966)
- “Motation.” Progressive Architecture Vol. 46 (July 1965): ppg. 126–133
- Cities (1963)
