= Lakewold Gardens =

Non-profit estate garden in Lakewood, Washington

Coordinates: 47.145°N 122.537°W

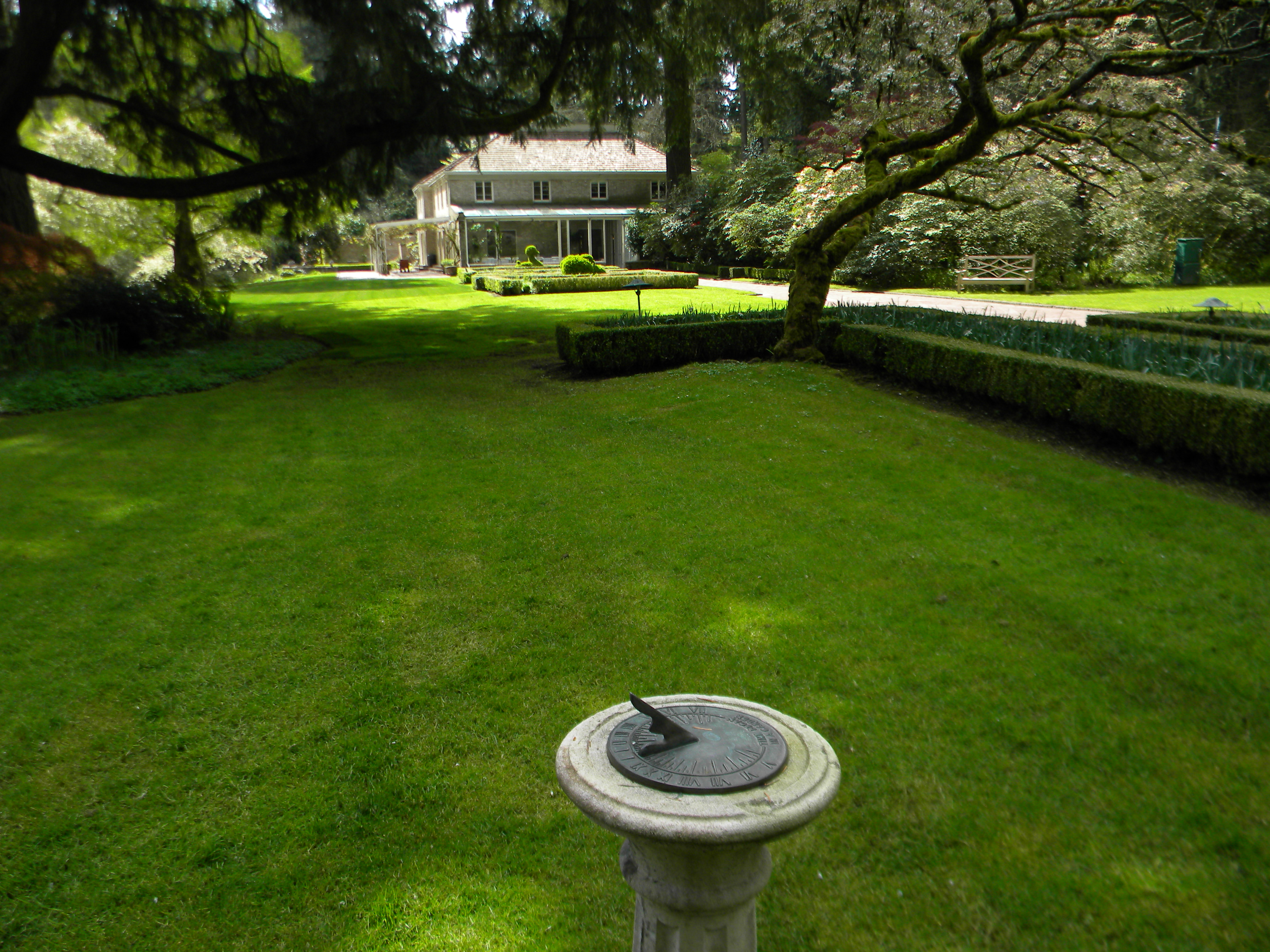
- Lakewold
- Interactive map of Lakewold Gardens
- Type: Non-profit garden
- Location: 2317 Gravelly Lake Drive SW
- Nearest city: Lakewood, Washington
- Area: 10 acres (4.0 ha)
- Created: 1908
- Website: lakewoldgardens.org

Lakewold Gardens is a 10-acre (40,000 m^{2}) non-profit estate garden located at 12317 Gravelly Lake Drive SW, Lakewood, Washington, in an area known as the Lakes District. It is open to visitors year-round.

== History ==
The property first began in 1908 as a 5 acre (20,000 m^{2}) home site for Emma Alexander, who transferred the property to her son Hubbard Alexander and his wife Ruth Alexander. At this point the gardens were already well known in the area. The Alexanders purchased an adjacent site in 1918. In 1925 the property was sold to Major Everett Griggs and his wife, Grace, who renamed the property "Lakewold," a middle-English word meaning "lake-woods." In 1938 the property was sold again to G. Corydon and Eulalie Wagner, who began collecting plants and engaged Thomas Church as a landscape architect.

In 1987 Mrs. Wagner donated the estate to a non-profit organization, the Friends of Lakewold, stating, "As we become more and more city creatures, living in manmade surroundings, perhaps gardens will become even more precious to us, letting us remember that we began in the garden."

== Collections ==
Lakewold Gardens was designed by the owner, Eulalie Wagner, with assistance from renowned landscape architect Thomas Church, to be a place for people, full of hidden spaces, eye-catching details and framed vistas. The gardens include a variety of gardening styles, from the European boxwood parterres and topiary, to Asian-inspired shade gardens. Plantings closer to the house are formal, whereas plantings down the slope towards Gravelly Lake are less formal. Rocks, streams, woodland areas, and mature trees, pathways, open lawns, and flower beds can all be found on the slope to the lake.

=== Gardens ===
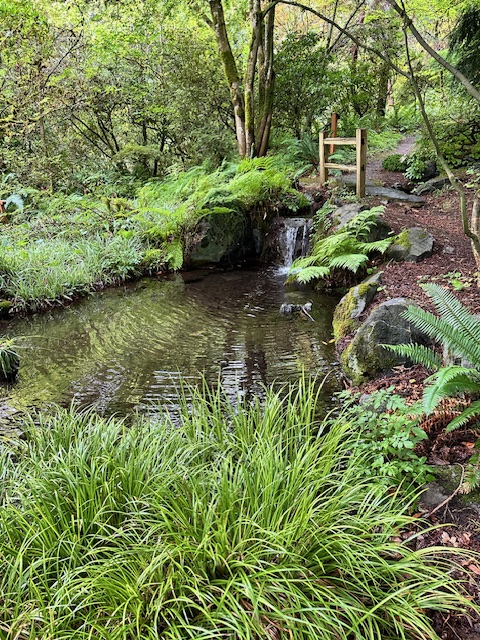
Small waterfall along a trail.

Specialty gardens at Lakewold

- Boxwood Parterres - Boxwoods shaped into ground-level geometric patterns
- The Tom Gillies Hardy Fern Foundation Display Garden - hardy ferns and shade perennials from around the world.
- Knot garden - herbs planted and trained in a fashion that resembles a loosely tied ribbon
- Rhododendron Collection - hundreds of hybrid and species rhododendron.
- Rock Garden - gentians, saxifrages, dianthus, lewisias, dwarf rhododendrons, and alpine plants.
- Rose/Cutting Garden
- Screes - one devoted primarily to lewisias, another to fuzzy-foliage alpine plants, and a third to heath and primula.
- Waterfall - alpine stream with three waterfalls, bulbs, orchids, rhododendrons, azaleas, bog plants, and primulas.
- Woodland Garden - Douglas fir, with hellebores, orchids, trillium, erythronium, and primulas.

=== Washington State Champion trees ===
- Acer palmatum - Japanese Maple, see Circle Drive
- Acer palmatum ‘Atropurpureum’ - Red Japanese Maple
- Halesia caroliniana var. monticola - Mountain Silverbell
- Ilex x altaclerensis camelliafolia - Camellia-leaved Highclere,
- Ilex crenata - Japanese Holly
- Metasequoia glyptostroboides - Dawn Redwood
- Parrotia persica - Persian Ironwood
- Prunus lusitanica - Portugal Cherry
- Prunus ‘Pandora’ - Pandora Cherry
- Prunus ‘Tai Haku’- Tai Haku Cherry

== Museum governance ==
Lakewold is a non profit estate garden that is governed by a board of directors who are responsible for determining policy and procedures as well as providing oversight regarding the operation of Lakewold Gardens and the Wagner House. The staff includes 4-5 administrative personnel, 6 garden and facilities personnel, and several interns. Volunteers provide year-round assistance in many areas of garden management, including garden maintenance, leading tours, special events, mailings, and other projects.

== Programming ==
=== Audience ===
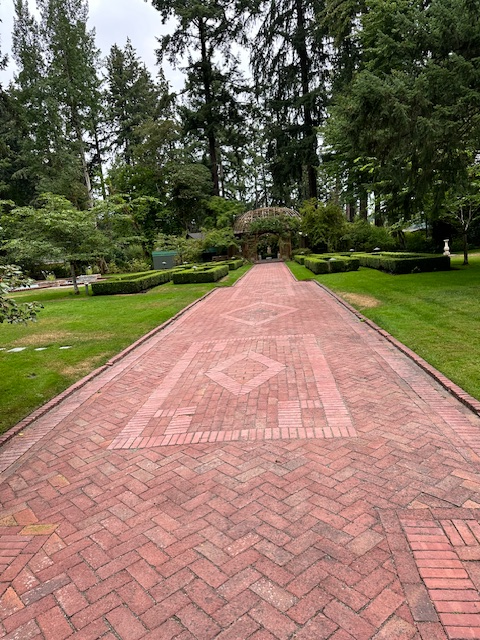
A section of the gardens.

Lakewold seeks to reach a variety of people through its gardens, tours, and programming. Current attendance is approximately 2:1 female to male, the typical visitor is in their mid-forties to upper-sixties. Campaigns to increase audience diversity have led to greater attendance by families and military personnel. (Lakewold Gardens is near McChord Air Force Base and Fort Lewis (Joint Base Lewis-McChord). The busiest time of year at the garden is May, particularly around Mother's Day. Early spring flowers, fall color, and special events bring people in year-round.

=== Events ===
Lakewold Gardens has special events year-round, including:

- Music from Home
- MayFest
- FairyFest
- Discovery Walks with the Garden Manager
- Guest speakers
- Second City Chamber Concert Series

Martha Stewart came to a breakfast and fashion show at Lakewold Gardens in 1997 as part of a fundraising event.

=== Public Programs ===
Classes are offered to the public in topics including:

- Garden Photography
- Organic Gardening
- Herb Gardens
- Stone Sculpture
- Basic Pruning
- Cutting Gardens

In addition, group tours are available by reservation.

== See also ==
- List of botanical gardens in the United States

== Sources ==
1. Goodnow, Cecelia, "Step Back into a Gentler Time - A Stroll in a Garden Paradise is Followed By a Relaxing Victorian Luncheon," Seattle Post-Intelligencer (WA)-April 24, 2008
2. Henry, Chris, "Escape to the Tacoma gardens where blue poppies bloom" Kitsap Sun (Bremerton, WA)-May 15, 1998
3. Van Pelt, Robert, Champion Trees of Washington State University of Washington Press (October 1996), ISBN 0295975636
