= 29 Palms (film) =

- Poster
- Directed by: Leonardo Ricagni
- Written by: Tino Lucente
- Produced by: Bryan Lord; J. Todd Harris; Michael Rapaport
- Starring: Jeremy Davies; Rachael Leigh Cook; Michael Lerner; Litefoot; Russell Means; Chris O'Donnell; Michael Rapaport; Jon Polito
- Cinematography: Horacio Maira
- Edited by: Paula Halton
- Music by: Mario Grigorov
- Distributed by: Artisan Entertainment
- Release dates: July 29, 2002 (Germany); August 19, 2003 (United States)
- Running time: 93 minutes
- Country: United States
- Language: English

29 Palms is a 2002 crime thriller film directed by Leonardo Ricagni and starring Jeremy Davies, Rachael Leigh Cook, Michael Lerner, Litefoot, Russell Means, Chris O'Donnell, Keith David, Michael Rapaport and Jon Polito. The film is about a bag of money that affects the characters who possess it, and its varied contents, as it passes from one to another.

In 2002 Eagle Pictures released the film under the Italian title La Grande Sfida (The Great Challenge) on DVD.

== Reception ==
The film has an approval rating of 0% on Rotten Tomatoes from five critic reviews.
