= RSVP cycles =

System of creative methodology for collaboration

RSVP cycles is a system of creative methodology for collaboration. It was developed by Lawrence Halprin and Anna Halprin. Lawrence Halprin presented the system in a 1969 book The RSVP Cycles: Creative Processes in the Human Environment.(Halprin 1970)

By chance, when I finally put the headings together, they spelled RSVP, which is a communications idea meaning "respond".

— Halprin 1970, pp. 2–3

The name is an initialism referring to its four components:

Resources
Anything that can be used in the process, including time, physical materials, other people, ideas, limitations etc.
Score
Instructions for the work. This can be identified along a gradient scale of being an Open or a Closed score.
Valuaction
A process of dynamically responding to the work based on values.
Performance
Setting the work in motion.

Within each stage there is a micro-cycle, which includes all the other elements (e.g. scoring the resources, resourcing the performance, performing the score etc.). There is no set order in which stages should be completed, and one can jump from any element to any other element as long as there is consensus.
