= Ruthanna Hopper =

American author and actress (born 1972)

- Born: December 5, 1972 (age 53); Taos, New Mexico, U.S.
- Occupations: Artist, author, curator
- Notable work: "Emergence Exhibit" at The Figueroa; "Three Landscapes" Exhibit at Blum & Poe Gallery
- Parent(s): Dennis Hopper; Daria Halprin
- Relatives: Anna Halprin (maternal grandmother); Lawrence Halprin (maternal grandfather); Rose Halprin (great-grandmother)

Ruthanna Hopper (born December 5, 1972) is an American artist, author and curator.

== Early life ==
Hopper was born in Taos, New Mexico, the daughter of actor Dennis Hopper and actress Daria Halprin. Her grandparents are Anna and Lawrence Halprin.

Hopper grew up in Marin County, California. She describes her upbringing as "bohemian". She has three paternal half-siblings (two sisters, one brother) and a maternal half-sibling (brother) with whom she was raised in Marin County. Hopper studied art at UC Davis and theater arts in New York.

== Career ==
In 2008, she co-wrote Celebutantes with Amanda Goldberg, daughter of producer Leonard Goldberg. The novel became a New York Times bestseller. In 2011, the follow-up novel Beneath a Starlet Sky was published by St. Martin's Press.

Hopper returned to her work in visual art in 2011 after release of her second novel. Her art practice is in the tradition of the Halprin work. Hopper is a visual artist and a curator.
