= Heritage Park Plaza =

- U.S. National Register of Historic Places
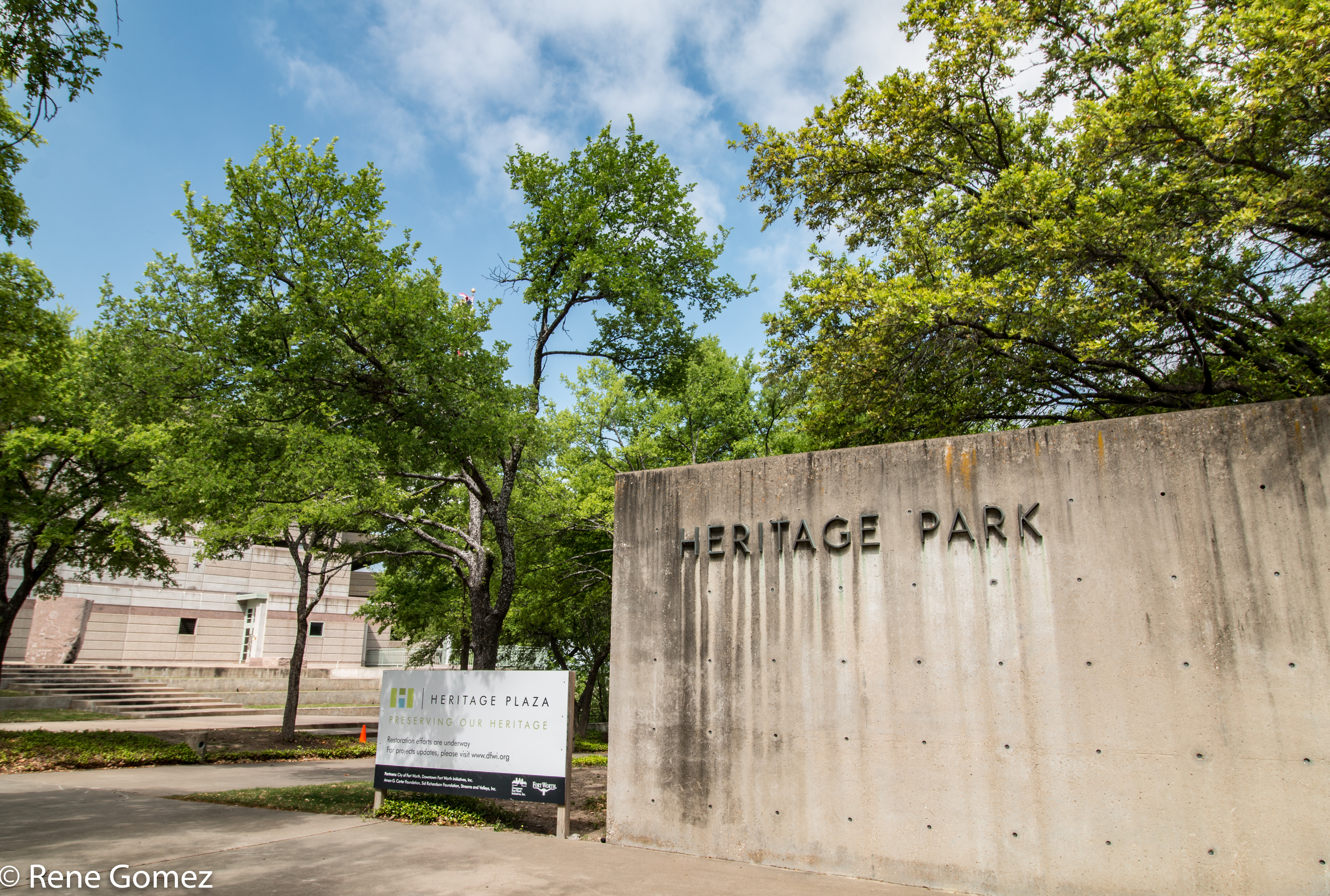
- Heritage Park Plaza in 2017

- Location within Texas Location within the United States
- Location: W Bluff St at Main St, Fort Worth, Texas
- Coordinates: 32°45′36″N 97°20′4″W
- Area: 0.5 acres (0.20 ha)
- Built: 1977
- Architect: Lawrence Halprin
- Architectural style: Modernist Park and Garden
- NRHP reference No.: 10000253
- Added to NRHP: May 10, 2010

The Heritage Park Plaza, also known as Heritage Plaza or Heritage Park Overlook or Upper Heritage Park, in Fort Worth, Texas is a Modernist style park that was designed by Lawrence Halprin. The listed area is a 1/2 acre portion of the 112-acre (0.45 km^{2}) Heritage Park. It is located at the northern edge of downtown Fort Worth and northwest of the Tarrant County Courthouse. The park lies at the original location where in the Spring of 1849, Major Ripley Arnold of the United States Army established a military post that became Fort Worth. The park opened on April 18, 1980.

According to the National Park Service:

Heritage Park Plaza is a public park in downtown Fort Worth, Texas designed by the internationally acclaimed architect Lawrence Halprin (1916-2009). The plaza design incorporates a set of interconnecting rooms constructed of concrete and activated throughout by flowing water walls, channels, and pools. Halprin later used this technique for the Franklin Delano Roosevelt Memorial in Washington, DC. This park represents one of Halprin's most significant projects and embodies his mature theories and philosophy of landscape design.

The property was listed on the U.S. National Register of Historic Places on May 10, 2010. The listing was announced as the featured listing in the National Park Service's weekly list of May 21, 2010.

The park has been closed since 2007 because of safety concerns. The 2014 City of Fort Worth bond vote approved $1.5 million for repairs.

Most recently, in May 2024, the Amon G. Carter Foundation pledged an additional $1M to support the planned renovations. To date, $45 million has been raised.

== See also ==
- National Register of Historic Places listings in Tarrant County, Texas
