= Daria Halprin =

American actress

- Born: December 30, 1948 (age 77); San Francisco Bay Area, California, U.S.
- Occupations: Expressive Arts Therapist/Educator; author; dancer; actress
- Years active: 1968–present
- Spouses: Dennis Hopper (m. 1972; div. 1976) Khosrow Khalighi (m. 1979)
- Children: 2, including Ruthanna Hopper
- Parent(s): Lawrence Halprin; Anna Halprin
- Relatives: Rose Halprin (paternal grandmother)

Daria Halprin (born December 30, 1948) is an American somatic-expressive arts therapist, author, teacher dancer, and former actress known primarily for her performances in three films of the late 1960s and early 1970s and as founding director of Tamalpa Institute.

== Early life ==
Daria Halprin was born in a Jewish family and raised in the San Francisco Bay Area, the daughter of San Francisco-based landscape architect Lawrence Halprin and choreographer Anna Halprin (née Schuman), who, in the 1950s, was one of the Western pioneers of using dance as a healing art. Like her mother, Halprin studied dance, and in the mid 1960s, began acting in film. Her paternal grandmother was Zionist leader Rose Halprin.

== Acting career ==
In 1968, she appeared in Revolution, a documentary by Jack O'Connell. Shot mainly in San Francisco, the film depicted the counterculture movement and featured a series of interviews with that city’s hippie residents.

Halprin was chosen by director Michelangelo Antonioni for the lead in his second English-language feature, Zabriskie Point. The film, released in 1970, was a statement on the burgeoning violence in America and the growing rift between the establishment and the counterculture. Following release of the film, with her Zabriskie Point co-star Mark Frechette, Halprin briefly joined self-styled guru Mel Lyman, a former member of the Jim Kweskin Jug Band, and his 100-member commune.

In 1972, Halprin appeared in John Flynn's thriller The Jerusalem File. Also in 1972, she married actor/director Dennis Hopper. The marriage produced one child, Ruthanna Hopper, and the couple divorced in 1976.

== Later life ==
In the 1970s, Halprin developed an interest in creative arts therapy. In 1978, she and her mother Anna founded the Tamalpa Institute and developed the Halprin Process. She has written The Expressive Body in Life, Art and Therapy and Coming Alive: The Creative Expression Method, and she was a contributing author to Foundations of Expressive Arts Therapy.

== Filmography ==
Year	Title	Role	Notes
1968	Revolution	Herself	Documentary
1970	Zabriskie Point	Daria	
1972	The Jerusalem File	Nurit	
