= The Jerusalem File =

1972 American film by John Flynn

- Directed by: John Flynn
- Written by: Troy Kennedy Martin
- Produced by: Ram Ben Efraim
- Starring: Bruce Davison; Nicol Williamson
- Cinematography: Raoul Coutard
- Edited by: Norman Wanstall
- Music by: John Scott
- Distributed by: Metro-Goldwyn-Mayer
- Release date: 1972
- Running time: 96 min
- Country: United States
- Language: English

The Jerusalem File (also known as Jerusalem, Jerusalem) is a 1972 American film directed by John Flynn and starring Bruce Davison, Nicol Williamson, Daria Halprin, and Donald Pleasence. It was written by Troy Kennedy Martin.

== Plot ==
American archaeology student David Armstrong is studying at the University of Jerusalem. His old Arab friend from Yale University Rashid Rifaat draws him into a power struggle between rival Arab terrorist groups. Both are nearly killed in an assassination attempt on Rifaat who then goes into hiding. Professor Lang at the University tries to protect Armstrong and hides him at an archaeological dig at Qumran in the West Bank. He promises to help him get back to America, but Major Samuels of the Israeli security agency Shin Bet confiscates Armstrong's passport. Samuels wants to use Armstrong to learn more about the organisation and leadership of the Arab groups and identify Rifaat as the leader of the West Bank Resistance. At Qumran the beautiful Nurit seduces Armstrong to keep him loyal to their terrorist group and arrange a meeting with Rifaat. Amstrong goes back to Jerusalem and tries to contact Rifaat using a special coin he presents to a local antique dealer who is later killed. Professor Lang intercepts the coin. He tries to stop Armstrong and make him see sense, but Armstrong eventually succeeds and a meeting takes place in the desert with disastrous consequences. The story takes place after the 1967 Six Day War.

== Cast ==
- Bruce Davison as David Armstrong
- Nicol Williamson as Professor Lang
- Daria Halprin as Nurit
- Donald Pleasence as Major Samuels
- Ian Hendry as Mayers
- Koya Yair Rubin as Barak
- Zeev Revah as Raschid Rifaat
- David Smader as Herzen
- Jack Cohen as Altouli

== Production ==
Director John Flynn later recalled the original script was bad but Troy Kennedy Martin rewrote it and Flynn loved the result. The movie was shot in Israel. In a 2005 interview Flynn recalled:

I stayed at the American Colony Hotel in east Jerusalem, further refining the script while waiting for the production money to come in. All the foreign journalists congregated in the bar of that hotel. So I’d be sitting there in that cavern, as they called it, with all these gentlemen of the press, getting the inside dope on what was really happening in Israel... I never saw Ian Hendry sober, but he somehow managed to function. He’d start with a couple of shots in the morning, but it didn’t seem to affect him. He’d say his lines clearly. Hendry was a perfectly functioning alcoholic when I worked with him. Nicol Williamson (who played an archaeologist) was a wild man too. Very heavy drinker. Late one night, Nicol got quite loaded and threatened to throw Bob Dylan off a hotel balcony!

== Reception ==
The Monthly Film Bulletin wrote: "A misguided attempt to make an entertainment thriller out of the continuing crisis of Arab-Israeli politics. Since all that emerges is confusion, it's hard to see why anyone should have thought it worth adding fuel to an already well stoked fire. Troy Kennedy Martin's script contradicts itself at every turn, like his television scripts self-consciously playing on ambiguity. ... John Flynn directs as though this were simply a thriller which happens to be set in Israel (zippy cutting, colourful locations, all the stylistic ticks of television spy thrillers), and with Raoul Coutard behind the camera the film is always easy on the eye. But to take the script at its word, political moralising is best left to those who know what they want to say."

Variety wrote: "This minor effort, shot entirely on location in Israel, particularly Jerusalem and Tel Aviv University, is almost as confused in its production as it is in its political message. ... The principal fault may be the mixture of too many nationalities in the film's makeup. Director John Flynn works from an original screenplay by Troy Kennedy Martin, whose political attitudes come off here as a might [sic] fuzzy (or is that one way of not antagonizing either side). Camerawork varies from stunningly handsome (and anyone who can make the flat, dusty highways around Jerusalem interesting is truly gifted) to routine. ... There's little originality in the film. Time and after time, a sequence will smack of an earlier, better film.

A. H. Weiler of The New York Times wrote: "The politics, the disparate motivations and the implicit drama of youth defeated by a world they don't want are only vaguely projected and are secondary to the chase and shoot-em-up action of The Jerusalem File."

Flynn said the film "didn’t do well at the box office and has all but disappeared."

== Home media ==
The film only ever made it onto VHS in various dubbed or subtitled languages. It can be found on YouTube in English with Finnish subtitles.

== See also ==
- List of American films of 1972
