= Manhattan Square Park =

Park in Rochester, New York, US

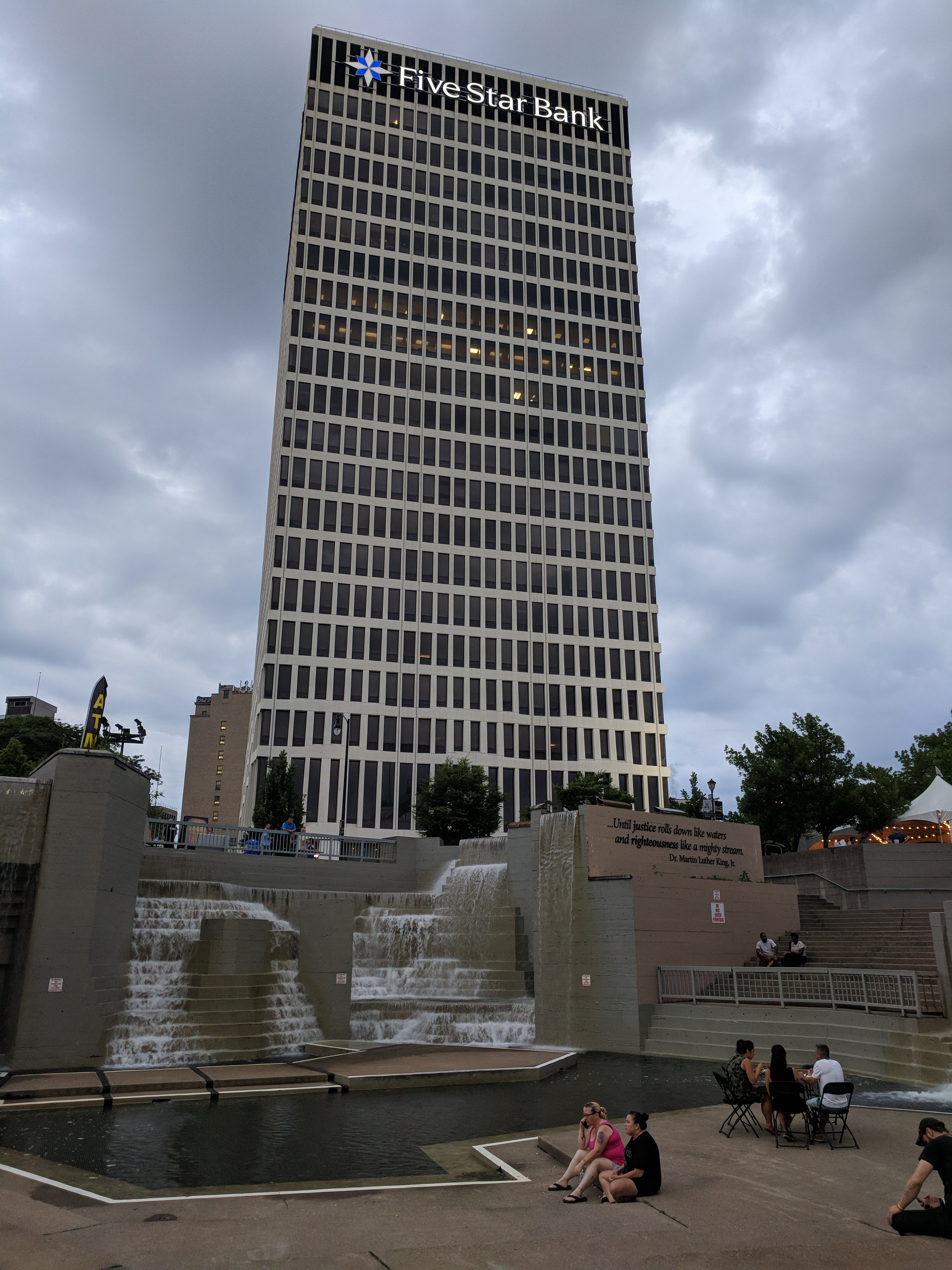
- Manhattan Square Park
- Interactive map of Manhattan Square Park
- Type: Urban park
- Location: Rochester, New York, U.S.
- Coordinates: 43.153913°N 77.602160°W
- Area: 5 acres (2.0 ha)
- Designer: Lawrence Halprin
- Operator: City of Rochester
- Open: 1974

Manhattan Square Park, officially Dr. Martin Luther King Jr. Memorial Park at Manhattan Square, is a 5-acre (2.0 ha) urban park in downtown Rochester, New York. Designed by landscape architect Lawrence Halprin in 1971–1972 and opened in 1974, the park was the centerpiece of the city's Southeast Loop urban renewal plan. It is adjacent to The Strong National Museum of Play and is the largest park within the Inner Loop. The park was renamed in honor of Martin Luther King Jr. in 2013.

== History ==
The site of the park was previously occupied by tenement housing until the city cleared approximately 60 acres for urban renewal in 1968. Lawrence Halprin and Lawrence Halprin & Associates designed the park in 1971–1972, organizing the space into six distinct zones set at a 45-degree angle to the surrounding street grid. The park opened in 1974.

In 2013, the park was officially designated Dr. Martin Luther King Jr. Memorial Park at Manhattan Square.

== Design and features ==
Halprin's design includes a sunken concrete plaza with a 2,000-seat amphitheater, a waterfall fountain, and a steel scaffold-like frame with viewing platforms and an observation tower. Other features include a children's play area, a hockey and skating rink (which also serves as a reflecting pool), a large meadow, a bermed garden with a tree grove, and a tree-shaded promenade. Park Drive (now Manhattan Square) and a sky-lit underpass below Chestnut Street separate vehicular and pedestrian traffic.

The park is eligible for listing in the National Register of Historic Places for its association with Rochester's urban renewal era and as the work of master landscape architect Lawrence Halprin.

== Renovations ==
The children's play area was updated in the 1990s. In 2008, the skating rink was redesigned to function as a reflecting pool during warmer months. In 2017, the park's waterfall fountains were restored and now feature a partial quotation from Dr. King: "…Until justice rolls down like water and righteousness like a mighty stream."

In 2025, the City of Rochester began a playground renovation to address deteriorating play structures and non-functional water features, with construction expected to be completed by fall 2025. A Phase IV renovation, focusing on the Court Street and Chestnut Street frontages and the south berm garden, entered its design phase in 2025 with landscape architecture firm Barton & Loguidice as lead consultant.
