= Thomas Church (landscape architect) =

American landscape architect (1902–78)

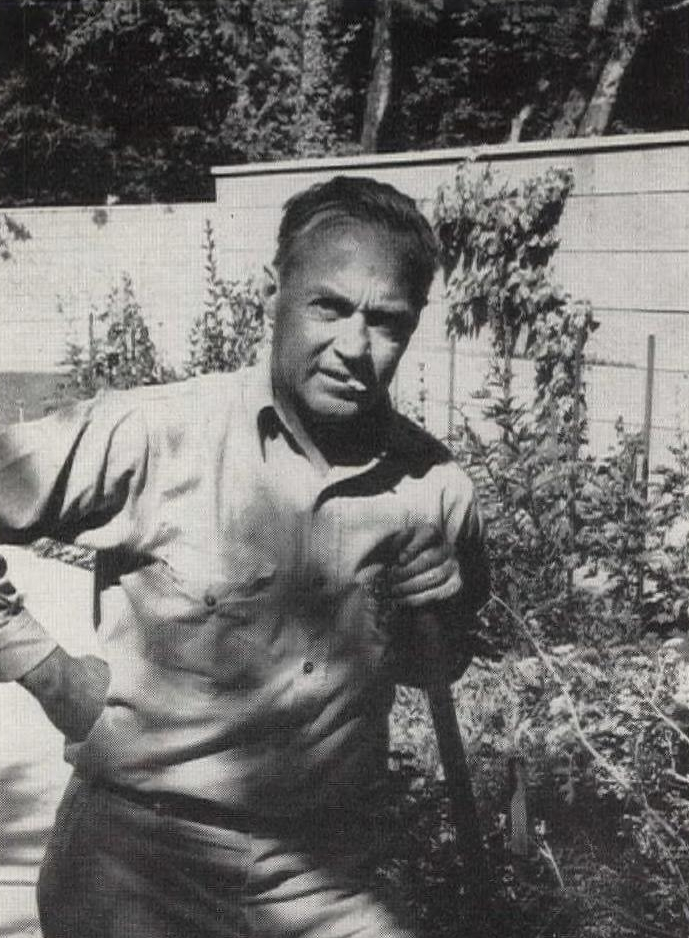
- Church c. 1959
- Born: April 27, 1902; Boston, Massachusetts, U.S.
- Died: August 30, 1978 (aged 76); San Francisco, California, U.S.
- Occupation: Landscape architect

Thomas Dolliver Church (April 27, 1902 – August 30, 1978) was a 20th century landscape architect based in California. He is a nationally recognized as one of the pioneer landscape designers of Modernism in garden landscape design known as the 'California Style'. His design studio was in San Francisco from 1933 to 1977.

== Biography ==
Thomas Church was born in Boston, and raised in California, in Ojai and Oakland.

He received his B.A. degree in Landscape Architecture from the College of Agriculture at the University of California, Berkeley in 1922. He then attended the Harvard Graduate School of Design, where he received his master's degree in City Planning and Landscape Architecture in 1926.

After graduating, Church spent six months at the American Academy in Rome on a Harvard awarded Sheldon Traveling Scholarship. He also traveled throughout Europe, and while in France became friends with Catherine Bauer, with whom he would later teach at Berkeley. He studied Italian Renaissance gardens, and Moorish and Iberian Renaissance Spanish gardens, observing their responses to a climate so similar the Mediterranean climate in California. On returning from Europe he worked in a city planning office on the East Coast (1927–1928), then he taught at Ohio State University (1928–1930).

He returned to the San Francisco Bay Area in 1930, and was a Special Lecturer in the UC Berkeley Department of Landscape Architecture for the remainder of that year. He also went into private practice in 1930 to design the Pasatiempo Estates in the Santa Cruz area, with Second Bay Tradition style architect William Wurster. A 1937 trip was made to Finland, where seeing new modernist works and site planning by Alvar Aalto was influential to his design evolution.

He moved to San Francisco in 1932 and established his practice in The city. Church opened his own design studio in 1933, at 402 Jackson Street in San Francisco. He continued to practice there until his retirement in 1977. His own distinctive garden and residence were on Hyde Street, in the Russian Hill, San Francisco district.

Church was a longtime contributor to Architectural Forum, House Beautiful, and Sunset magazines, bringing his design ideas with examples to his design peers and the public.

As of 1943, Church was a Socialist.

In 1951 Church was awarded the Fine Arts Medal, for Landscape Architecture, by the American Institute of Architects. In 1973, Church was elected to the National Academy of Design, as an Associate Academician. He was also awarded the Rome Prize for his work in landscape architecture by the American Academy in Rome.

=== Design innovation ===
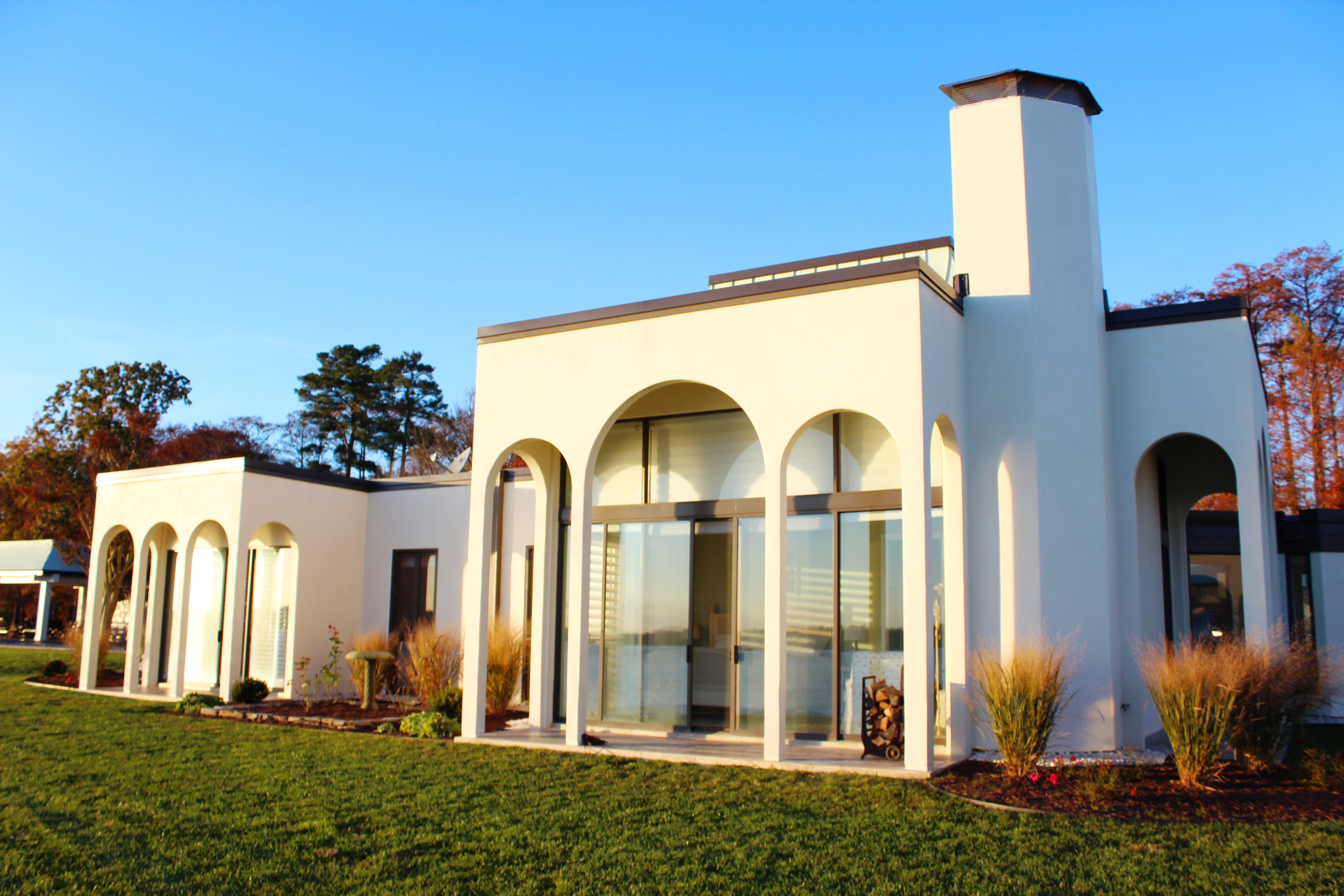
House and lawn at Dancing Point in eastern Virginia

When Church started practicing, the Neoclassical style was still the predominant landscape design style. Thomas' design education at UC Berkeley and Harvard, along with his travels to gardens in Europe, gave him ample training in Classical and Renaissance garden traditions. However, Church is renowned as a pioneer in American landscape architect for introducing the Modernist architecture and art movements into landscape design. After WW II, other designers added to what later became known as the "California Style" of gardens. Some of them apprenticed in his design studio, including Robert Royston and Lawrence Halprin.

Church outlined four principles for his design process in his 1955 book Gardens Are For People. They are:

- Unity — the consideration of the design as a whole, integrating the house and its gardens with a free flow between them.
- Function — the relation of the outdoor recreational and social areas to their interior counterparts, and of the outdoor service areas to the household's needs, to please and serve the people who live in them.
- Simplicity — upon which rests the aesthetic and economic success of the design.
- Scale — relating the different design parts, features, and areas to one another, to create a whole an integrated landscape design.

Church used the Modernist design principles for freedom of elements, such as the forms of spaces and features, and a sense of movement. When possible, he favored creating multiple viewpoints, instead of a traditional single axis. "A garden should have no beginning and no end," he wrote in Gardens Are for People, "and should be pleasing when seen from any angle, not only from the house." He could also use historicist design principles when the site called for it, such as the formal lines of the Memorial Courtyard (1965) beside the San Francisco Opera House.

Another design element Church is renowned for is the "outdoor room," creating sub-areas for outdoor living as distinct places within the whole landscape. They were different than those of Italian Renaissance gardens with a separation of house and garden, his outdoor rooms interacted with the house, with a free flow between the two

"Tommy represented freedom from 'decorating' a house," said former Sunset editor Walter Doty, shortly before Church's death. "Landscaping had meant gussying up structures that weren't worth it. Tommy was a 'behavioral' landscaper . . . gardens to live in were more important."

=== Works ===
The majority of Church's work was residential, and he reportedly designed over 2,000 private gardens in California and 24 other states. Notable residential works include the now iconic landscape design of El Novillero (Donnell Gardens) for the Donnell Residence (1947–1948), overlooking the winding salt marshes of the North Bay in Sonoma County, California. Others include the Mrs. Clinton Walker House in Carmel-by-the-Sea, California, and the Bloedel Reserve and Lakewold Gardens in Washington state.

He also worked on a number of larger non-residential landscape commissions. He worked on campus master plans for UC Berkeley, Stanford University, UC Santa Cruz, Harvey Mudd College, Woodside Priory School, and the Wascana Centre in Saskatchewan. He designed the grounds of the Embassy of the United States, Havana, the General Motors Research Laboratory in Detroit (1949–1953), the Des Moines Art Center, the Hotel El Panama in Panama City, the Mayo Clinic in Minnesota, and Parkmerced (1941–1951) in southwestern San Francisco.

He was the landscape design consultant to Stanford University for 30 years, beginning in the late 1940s. He served on the Stanford Architectural Advisory Council from 1960 to 1978, that President J.E. Wallace Sterling created. "Church was trying to put a layer of continuity around the original buildings and the new (ones), he was working on a (campus) landscape that was meant to tie all this together."

== Death ==
Thomas Church died on August 30 1978 from ALS, at the age of 76, in Russian Hill, San Francisco.

=== Legacy ===
Thomas Church had a long, distinguished, and productive career with over 4,000 projects, as a Landscape Architect. He also wrote several influential and popular landscape design books, including Gardens Are for People (1955) and Your Private World: A Study of Intimate Gardens (1969).

The Post-war Modernist garden design style, first in California and soon influential across the United States, was created and developed by a small group of landscape designers, of which Thomas Church was the "first founder." The subsequent founders and practitioners of the Modern California Landscape include Garrett Eckbo, Robert Royston, James C. Rose, and Dan Kiley.

== See also ==
- Landscape design history of the United States
- American landscape and garden designers
- American landscape architects

== Notes ==
=== References ===
- Thomas Dolliver Church; Gardens Are For People — San Francisco: McGraw-Hill Book Co., 1955, reissued 1983.
- Thomas Dolliver Church; Your private world; a study of intimate gardens — San Francisco; Chronicle Books, 1969.
- Waymark, Janet, Modern Garden Design Innovation since 1900 — London, Thames and Hudson.
- Pregill, Philip and Nancy Volkman, Landscapes in History: Design and Planning in the Western Tradition — New York: Van Nostrand Reinhold, 1993.
- Treib, Marc; Thomas Church, Landscape Architect Designing a Modern California Landscape, 90, 101–112 — San Francisco; William Stout Publishers, monograph, 2003.
- Online Archive of California—OAC: finding the Thomas D. Church Collection
- "Thomas Church, Landscape Architect : oral history transcript (1975–1978)" — Riess, Suzanne B.; Regional Oral History Office, The Bancroft Library, University of California, Berkeley, California.
- "Thomas D. Church, Landscape Architect : a Bibliography" — Vance, Mary A.; monograph; Vance Bibliographies, 1980.
- "Garden design". wikipedia.org.
