= West Coast Memorial to the Missing of World War II =

Memorial in San Francisco, California, U.S.

Coordinates: 37°47′55″N 122°28′41″W

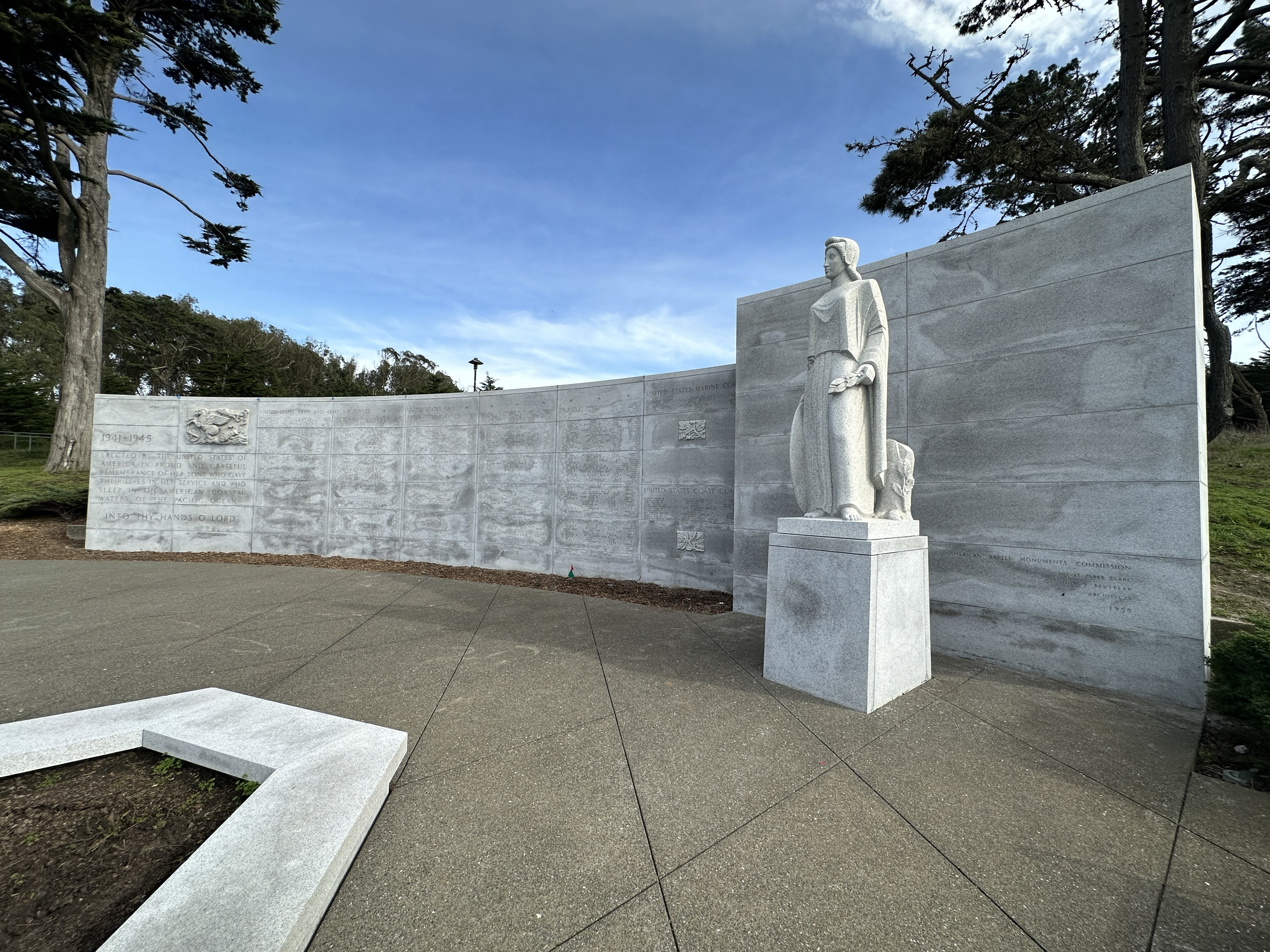
- Interactive map of West Coast Memorial to the Missing of World War II
- Location: United States
- Type: Sculoture
- Dedicated to: missing soldiers, sailors, marines, coast guardsmen, and airmen of World War II

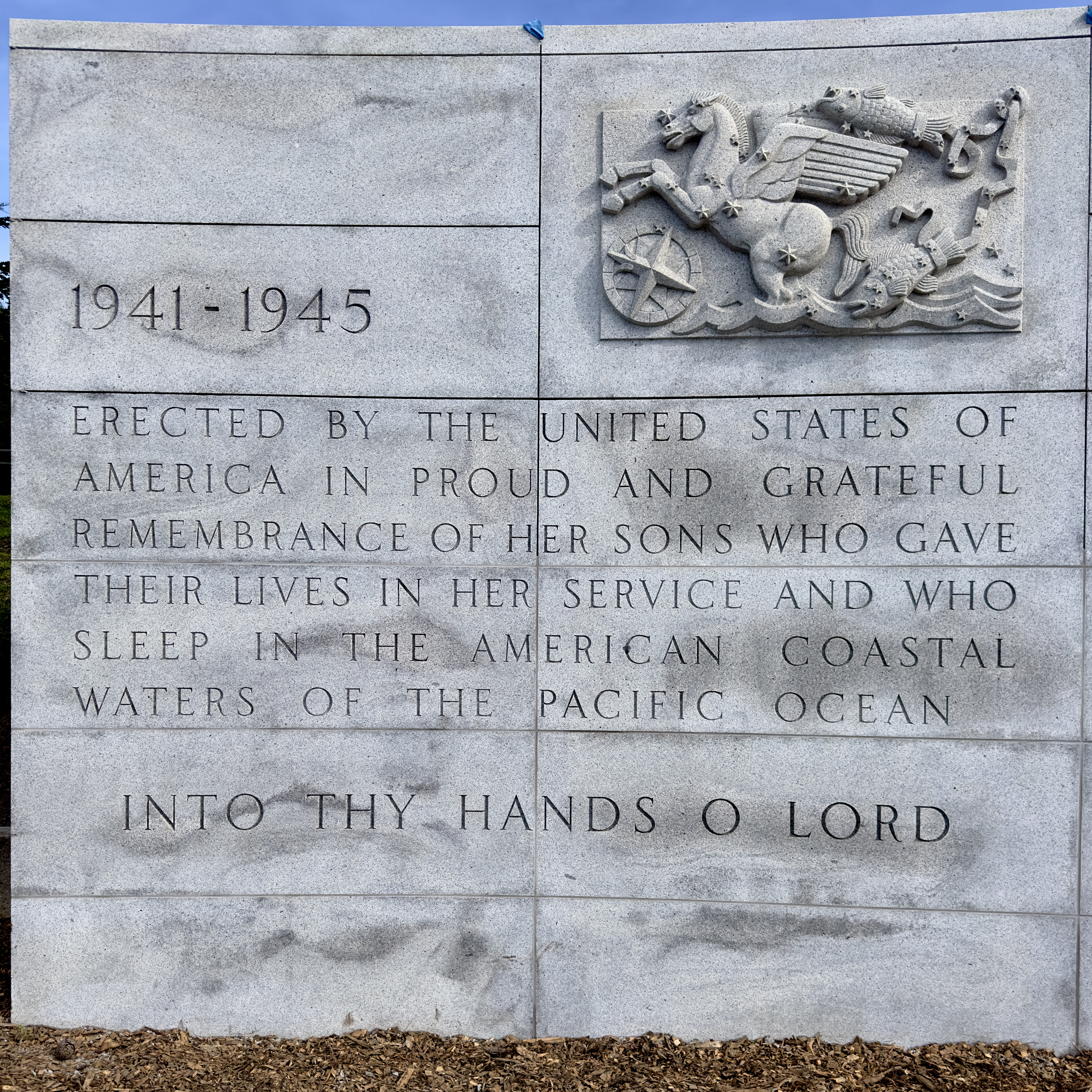
West Coast Memorial Inscription

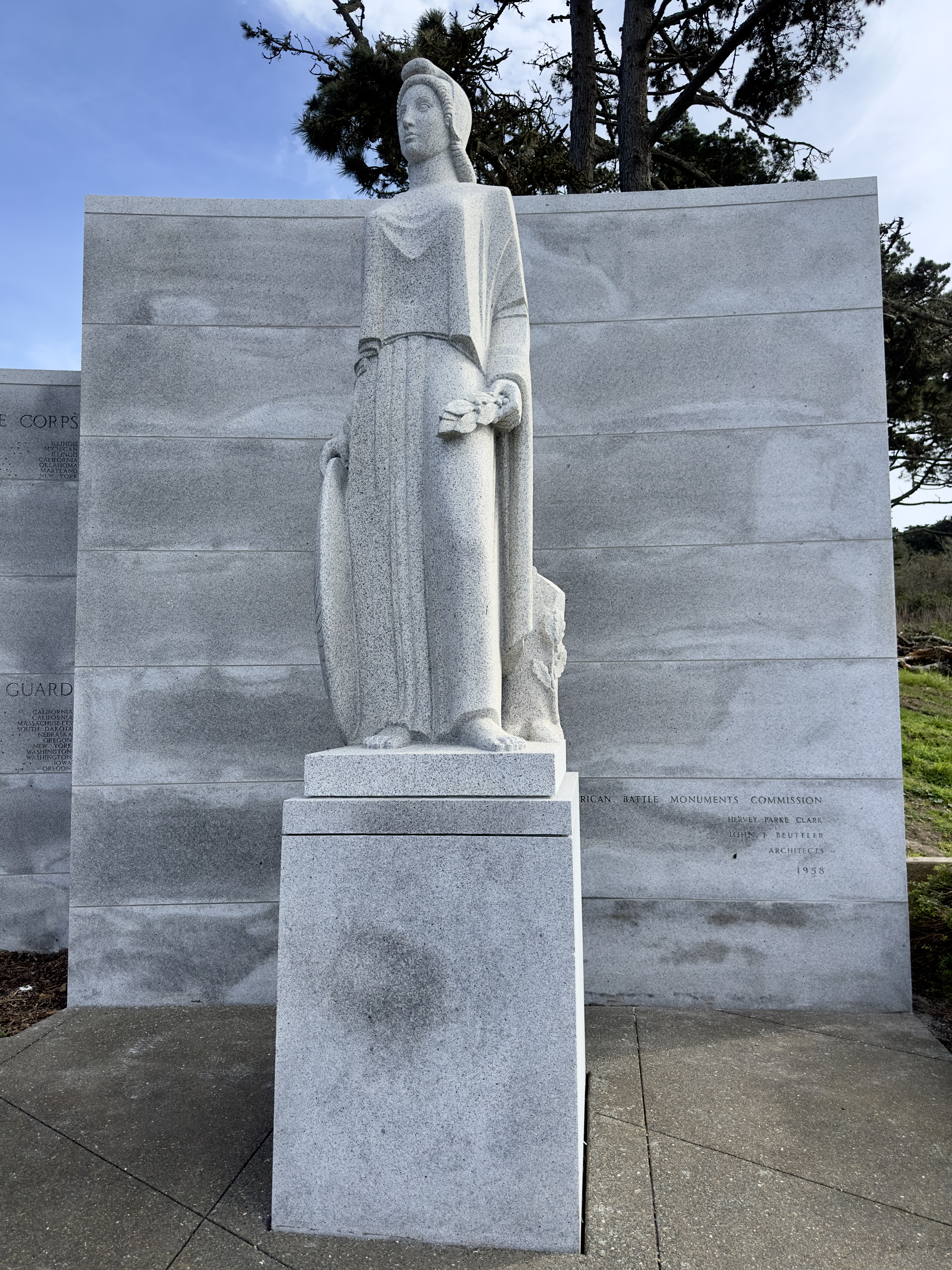
Statue of Columbia

The West Coast Memorial to the Missing of World War II is a monument dedicated to missing soldiers, sailors, marines, coast guardsmen, and airmen of World War II. It is a curved wall of California granite set in a grove of Monterey pine and cypress and overlooking the Pacific Ocean. It bears the name, rank, organization and State of each of the 413 members of the Armed Forces who lost their lives or were buried at sea in the Pacific coastal waters.

It is located on high ground overlooking Baker Beach along the Pacific Ocean, at the intersection of Lincoln and Kobbe Boulevards, along the western edge of the Presidio of San Francisco, California.

The architect was Hervey Parke Clark with landscape architecture by Lawrence Halprin. The sculptor was Jean de Marco, who won the 1965 Henry Hering Memorial Award for his work here.

The West Coast Memorial is one of three war memorials in the United States administered by the American Battle Monuments Commission; the others are the East Coast Memorial to the Missing of World War II in New York and the Honolulu Memorial.
