= Rose Halprin =

American Zionist leader

Rose Luria Halprin
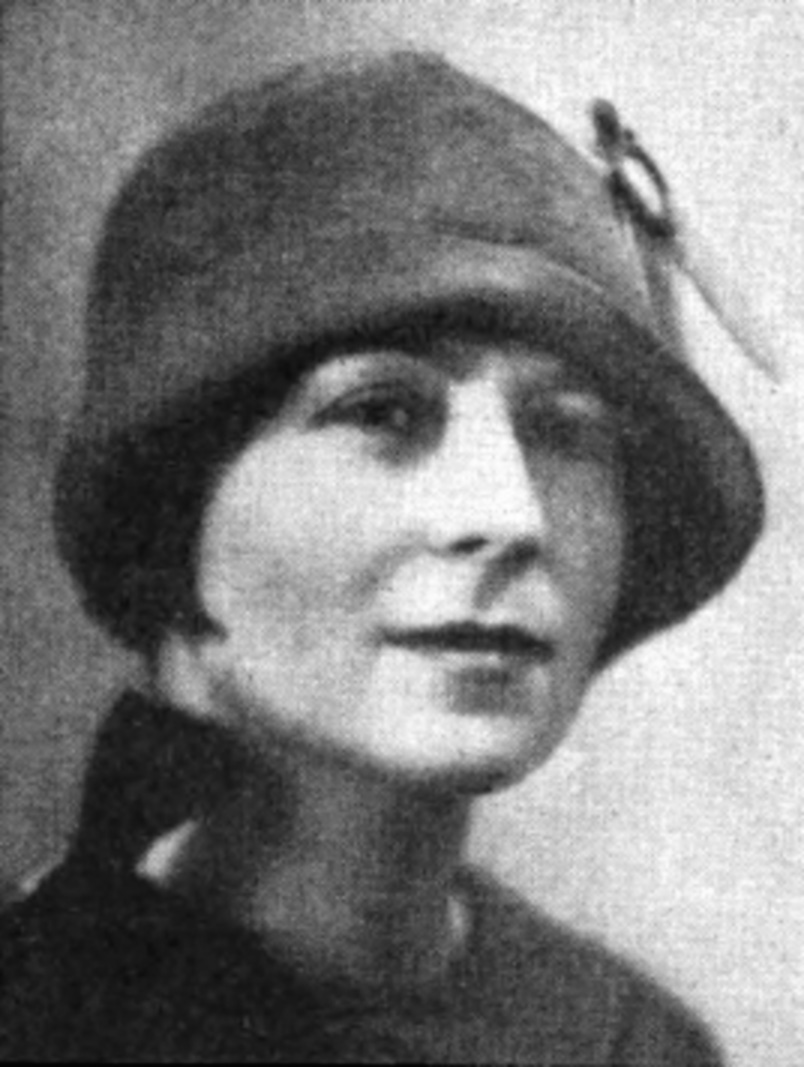
- Halprin in 1930
- Born: Rose Luria; April 11, 1896; New York City
- Died: January 8, 1978 (aged 81); Manhattan, New York
- Spouse: Samuel W. Halprin
- Children: 2, including Lawrence Halprin
- Relatives: Daria Halprin (granddaughter); Ruthanna Hopper (great-granddaughter); Anna Halprin (daughter-in-law)

Rose Luria Halprin (1896–1978) was an American Zionist leader and National President of the Hadassah Women's Zionist Organization of America. In addition to her two terms as Hadassah president, she also served on the Zionist General Council, American Zionist Emergency Council, American Jewish Conference, and the Jewish Agency for Palestine. As part of the American section for the Jewish Agency, she was involved in discussions that led to the establishment of the State of Israel.

== Personal life ==
Halprin was born on April 11, 1896, in New York to Pesach "Philip" Luria, a silverware dealer, and Rebecca (née Isaacson) Luria. She attended the Teachers Training School of the Jewish Theological Seminary of America from 1912–1913, Hunter College in 1914, and Columbia University from 1929–1931. She married Samuel W. Halprin and had two children, Lawrence Halprin, a landscape architect, designer, and teacher, and Ruth Kaslove, who became a Hadassah leader in her own right. She is a grandmother to Daria Halprin, a former actress mainly known for her lead role in Michelangelo Antonioni's film Zabriskie Point.

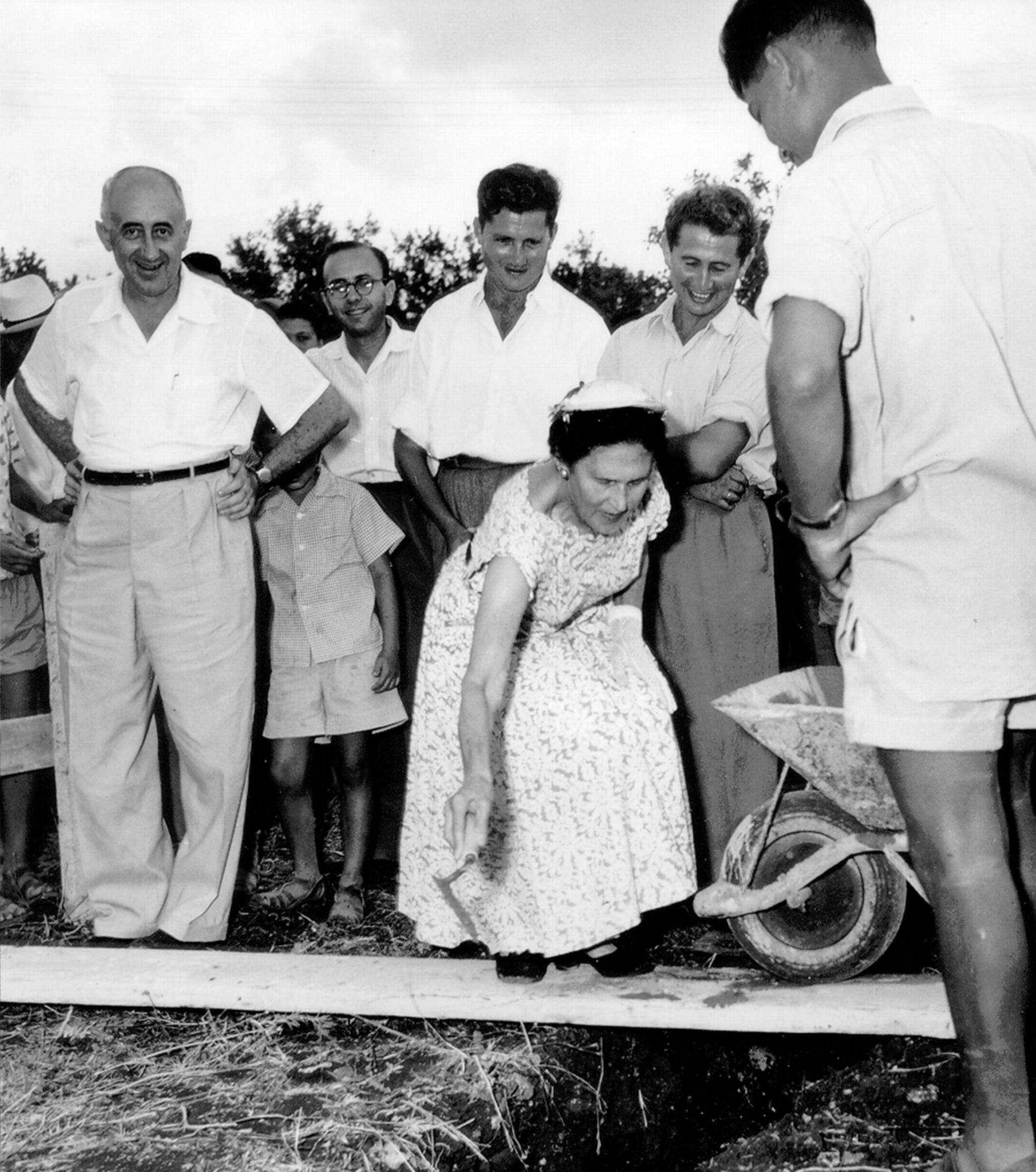
Foundation stone laying ceremony with Rose Halperin in Alonei Yitzhak 1950

She died at Mount Sinai Hospital in Manhattan on January 8, 1978.

== Hadassah ==
Halprin served her first term as National President from 1932–1934. After her term, she and her family moved to Palestine and operated as the liaison between Hadassah in Palestine and the Hadassah National Office from 1934–1939. While in Palestine, she helped oversee the building of the Hadassah Medical Organization's new hospital complex on Mount Scopus. She returned to the United States in 1939 and served her second term as National President from 1947–1952. She led the organization through Hadassah convoy massacre and established temporary locations for the hospital facilities when Israeli forces lost Mount Scopus.
