= Breath Made Visible =

- Directed by: Ruedi Gerber
- Release dates: August 7, 2009 (Locarno Film Festival); April 2, 2010 (United States)
- Running time: 82 minutes
- Language: English

Breath Made Visible is a 2009 documentary film about modern dance legend Anna Halprin. It is produced and directed by filmmaker Ruedi Gerber. The film premiered at the Mill Valley Film Festival where it received the Audience Award Certificate of Excellence and at the Locarno Film Festival in 2009.

Prior to directing his first U.S. feature film, Heartbreak Hospital, Gerber had a number of award-winning documentaries to his credit, including Meta-Mecano and Living With the Spill, a documentary about the Exxon Valdez oil spill. Gerber is a former Halprin student and a graduate of the New York University film school, Tisch School of the Arts in 1990. Before he became a film director, Gerber acted in over 30 plays at theaters throughout Europe including the German State theaters of Mannheim, Dortmund, Wuppertal, and in Vienna and Basel.
