= Donnell Garden =

US landscape design by Thomas Church

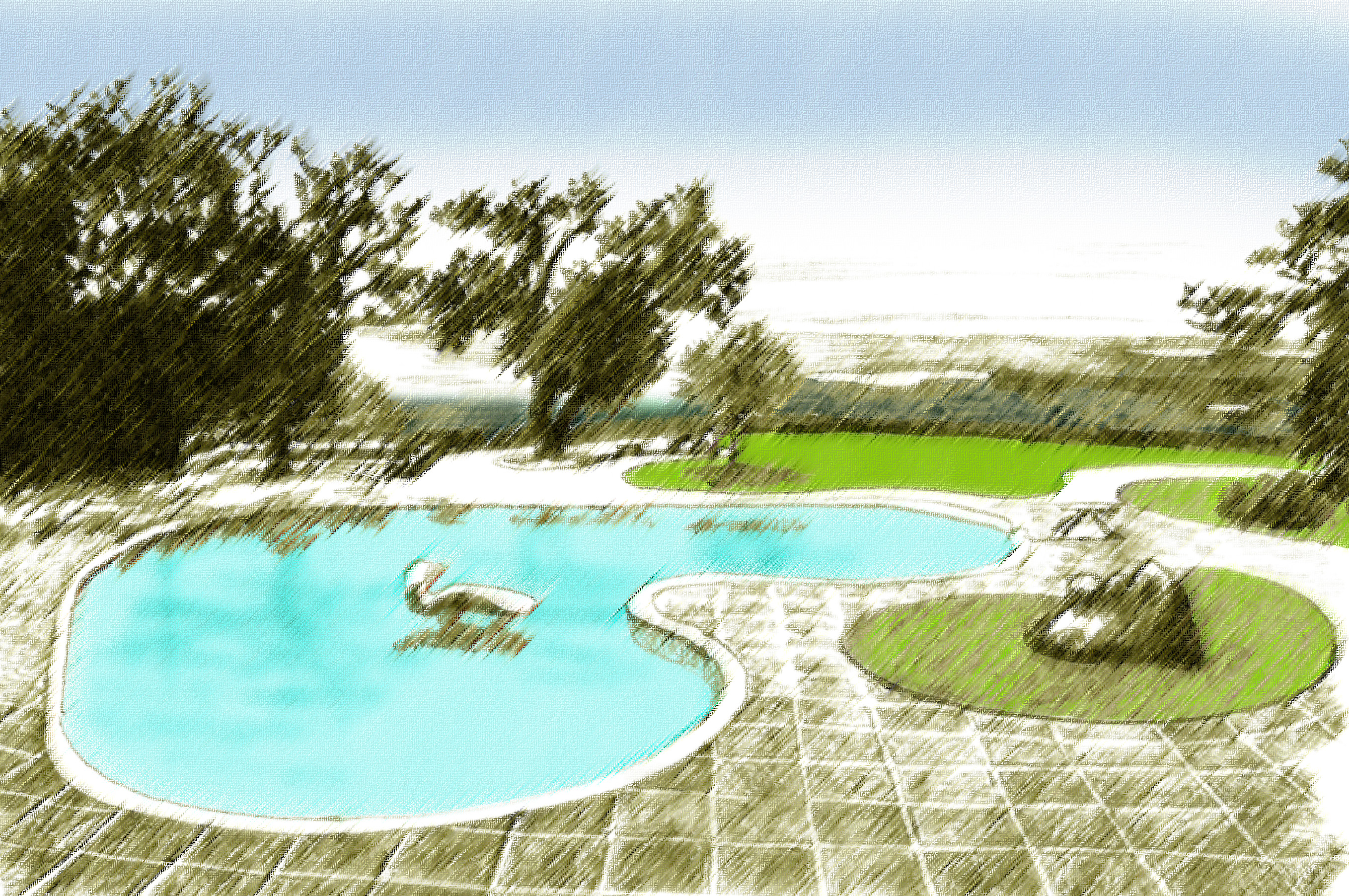
An illustration of Donnell Garden

Donnell Ranch Garden is considered one of the masterpieces of modern landscape design, and one of the first examples of the now-ubiquitous kidney shaped swimming pool. It was constructed in 1948 at the Donnell Ranch in Sonoma, California, by landscape architect Thomas Church.
