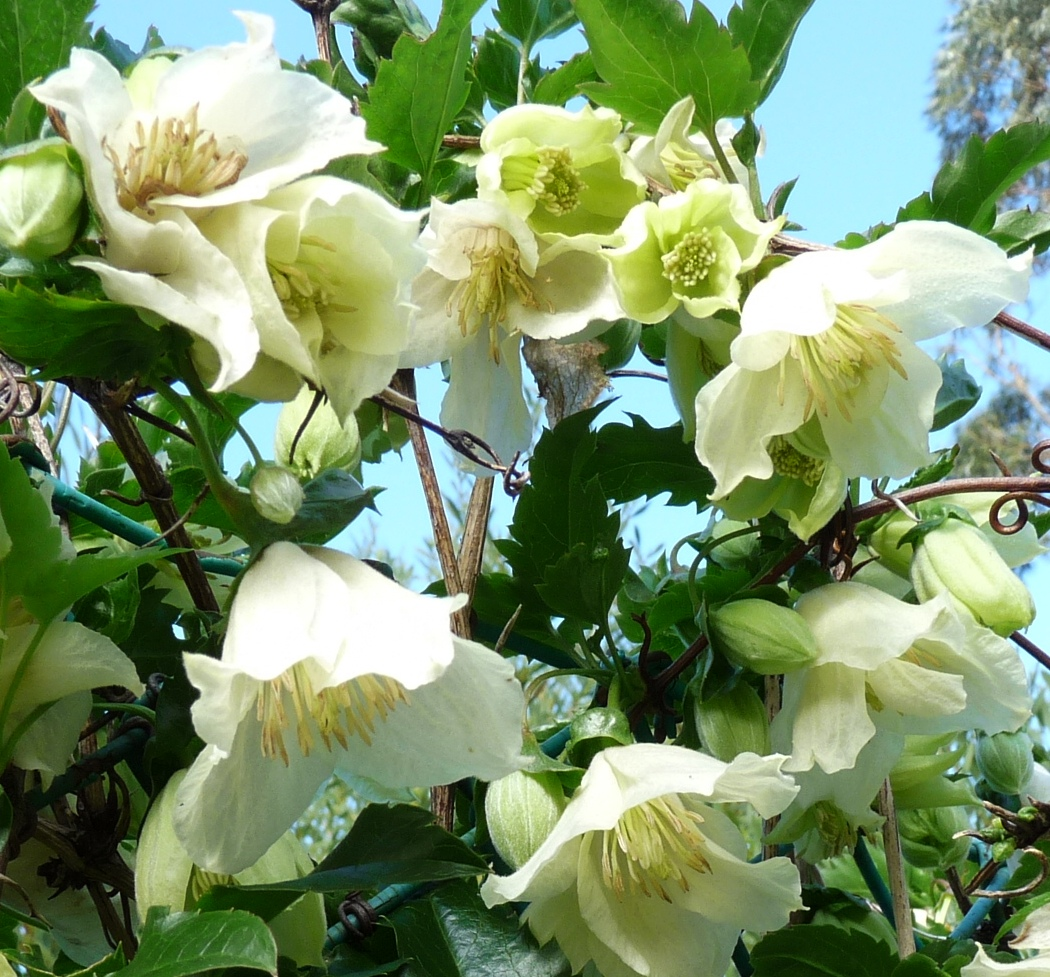
- Flowers
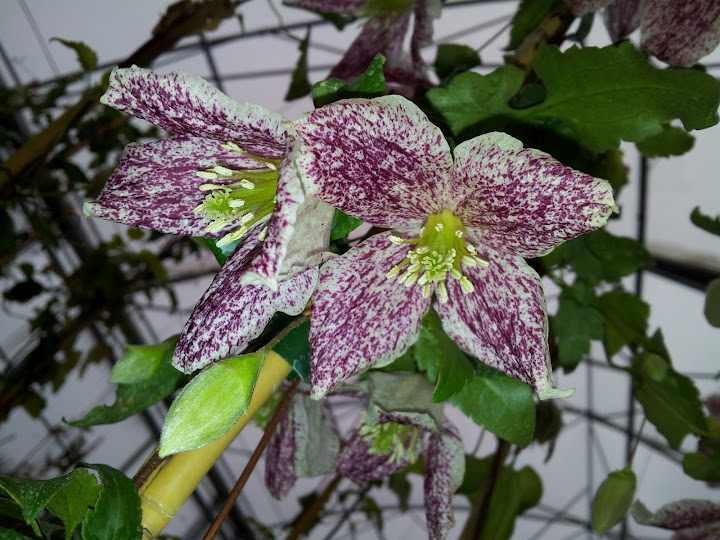
- 'Freckles' cultivar

Scientific classification
- Kingdom: Plantae
- Clade: Tracheophytes
- Clade: Angiosperms
- Clade: Eudicots
- Order: Ranunculales
- Family: Ranunculaceae
- Genus: Clematis
- Species: C. cirrhosa

Binomial name
- Clematis cirrhosa L., 1753

Subspecies
- Clematis cirrhosa var. balearica (Balearic Islands)

Synonyms
- Atragene balearica Pers.; Atragene cirrhosa Pers.; Cheiropsis balearica Bercht. & J.Presl; Cheiropsis cirrhosa Bercht. & J.Presl; Cheiropsis elegans Spach; Cheiropsis semitriloba Bercht. & J.Presl; Clematis balearica Rich.; Clematis calycina Aiton; Clematis laeta Salisb.; Clematis pedicellata (DC.) Sweet; Clematis semitriloba Lag.

= Clematis cirrhosa =

Species of flowering plant in the buttercup family

Clematis cirrhosa is a species of flowering plant in the family Ranunculaceae, native to the Mediterranean. It includes the 'Freckles', 'Wisley Cream' and 'Jingle Bells' cultivars, with 'Freckles' and 'Wisley Cream' having gained the Royal Horticultural Society's Award of Garden Merit.

It is also one of 8 subdivisions in the Thorncroft Clematis catalogue, published in 2000.
