= Anna Halprin =

American dancer (1920–2021)

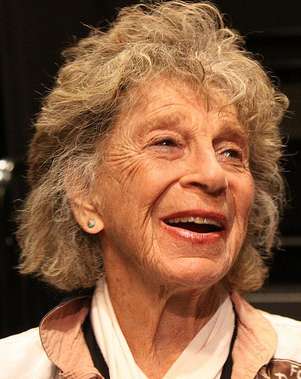
- Anna Halprin at the University of San Francisco, November 2010
- Born: Hannah Dorothy Schuman; July 13, 1920; Winnetka, Illinois, U.S.
- Died: May 24, 2021 (aged 100); Kentfield, Marin County, California, U.S.
- Occupation: Dancer
- Spouse: Lawrence Halprin (m. 1940)
- Children: 2, including Daria Halprin
- Relatives: Ruthanna Hopper (granddaughter); Rose Halprin (mother-in-law); Dennis Hopper (former-son-in-law)
- Dancing career
- Current group: Tamalpa Institute
- Dances: Postmodern dance
- Website: annahalprin.org

Anna Halprin (born Hannah Dorothy Schuman; July 13, 1920 – May 24, 2021) was an American choreographer and dancer. She helped redefine dance in the postwar United States and pioneer the experimental art form known as postmodern dance and referred to herself as a breaker of the rules of modern dance. In the 1950s, she established the San Francisco Dancers' Workshop to give artists like her a place to practice their art. Exploring the capabilities of her own body, she created a systematic way of moving using kinesthetic awareness. With her husband, landscape architect Lawrence Halprin, she developed the RSVP cycles, a creative methodology that includes the idea of scores and can be applied broadly across all disciplines. Many of her creations have been scores, including Myths in the 1960s which gave a score to the audience, making them performers as well, and a highly participatory Planetary Dance (1987). Influenced by her own battle with cancer and her healing journey, Halprin became known for her work with the terminally ill patients as well as creative movement work in nature.

In 1978, together with her daughter Daria Halprin, she founded the Tamalpa Institute, based in Marin County, California, which offers training in Life/Art process, their creative methodology. Halprin has written books including: Movement Rituals, Moving Toward Life: Five Decades of Transformational Dance and Dance as a Healing Art. A documentary film about her life and art, Breath Made Visible directed by Ruedi Gerber, premiered in 2010.

== Early years ==
Halprin was born in Winnetka, Illinois, the daughter of Ida (née Schiff) and Isadore Schuman. Born into a Jewish family, Halprin was exposed from a very early age to dance, due to her grandfather's involvement in religious dancing. At 4 years old, Halprin was enrolled by her mother in ballet class to satisfy young Anna's urge to dance. Quickly realizing that the structured environment was no place for a mind and soul as creative as Halprin's, her mother withdrew her from the class and put her into a class that was more focused on movement. At the age of 15, Halprin began studying the techniques of Ruth St. Denis and Isadora Duncan.

In 1938, she attended University of Wisconsin under the direction of one of her lifelong mentors Margaret H'Doubler. H'Doubler emphasized the importance of personal creativity and highly encouraged the study of anatomy in order to obtain the most effective ways of moving. Halprin abandoned the stylized forms of modern technique to create her own way of reproducing the art of everyday life. Merce Cunningham shared the same need to reject the emotional expressiveness of modern dance. However, instead of using chance as a way to make movement like Cunningham did, Halprin turned to improvisation to investigate ways of making community. Because of H'Doubler, Halprin understood the conception of where invention in dance begins, and from this she could help form the basis of the next generation's ideas of postmodern dance.

She met her husband, landscape architect Lawrence Halprin, while in college.

== San Francisco Dancers' Workshop ==
After World War II, Lawrence Halprin's work called him to stay in San Francisco permanently. Anna Halprin wrote in a letter about her new journey saying she was ready "... to live a resourceful life with a connection to the soil and to the common pulse of ordinary people." In order to ease the transition, Lawrence built his wife a deck outside of their home for her to dance upon. Later this deck became a place of learning for herself, her children, and her students.

In late 1940s, Halprin danced with Mimi Kagan, under the name the San Francisco Dance League.

After performing in New York at the ANTA Theatre in 1955, Halprin was disappointed after watching a Martha Graham group and one of Doris Humphrey's. She thought everyone looked too similar to Graham and Humphrey, stifling creativity. Thus, Halprin founded the San Francisco Dancer's Workshop in 1959 along with several others, including dancers Trisha Brown, Simone Forti, and Yvonne Rainer, and artists John Cage and Robert Morris. The purpose of this organization was to give her and others the opportunity to delve into more explorative forms of dance and move away from the technical constraints of modern dance. During the span of twenty years, she developed a working process that gave people the liberty to move freely with emotion and with a feeling of community. This technique came to be called human potential growth; the aim was to maintain the link between non-verbal behavior and examining the use of language and physical expression. In addition to the workshop, Halprin continued to perform, dancing about "real life" in pieces such as Apartment 6 with fellow dancers, John Graham and AA Leath.

== Kinesthetic awareness and RSVP Cycles ==
Halprin's course of investigating her own way of creating movement called for understanding the limits of the body and the reactions the body makes when an initiation is made. In her own words she describes being aware of one's kinesthetic sense "is your special sense for being aware of your own movement and empathizing with others." She compiled group exercises named Movement Rituals that shape the way she and her students moved their bodies through space and time. Her movement patterns are based on the dynamic qualities such as swinging, falling, walking, running, crawls, leaps, and various ways of shifting weight.

In the 1960s she integrated into her approach the RSVP Cycles, developed by her husband, Lawrence Halprin, which breaks down the creative process with the use of scores. It stands for Resources, Scores, Valuaction and Performance. She says, "I wanted to create something for a group of people to do in which they're given the opportunity to explore the theme and find out what's real for them..." It was her hope that through formalized scores such as the Planetary Dance, (a formation of 3 circles, going in different directions, in which you're told to run, walk, or stand still) the process of creativity would be sparked in both dancers and non dancers. Her training programs, which can take up to a year, allowed participants to concentrate on the movement of each body part "taking the body apart" and then later on in the program, reassembling it to move as a whole.

== Working with the terminally ill ==
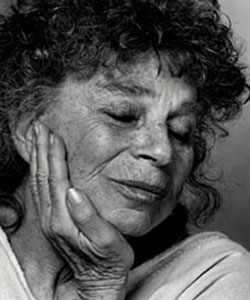
Anna Halprin

In 1972, Halprin was diagnosed with colorectal cancer. This sudden shift in her life inspired her to investigate and create associations to make a personal ritual that helped her healing process. She used the investigative and therapeutic tools she had learned from Fritz Perls in order to understand and duplicate the psychological behaviors put into performances. The disease also inspired her to release her emotions through dance in pieces such as Darkside Dance. Afterwards, she ceased to perform publicly.

Halprin documented her own experiences and compiled the information to make her own healing process called "The Five Stages of Healing". In 1981, she applied "The Five Stages of Healing" to her community and developed large community pieces. Halprin stated "I believe if more of us could contact the natural world in a directly experiential way, this would alter the way we treat our environment, ourselves, and one another."

Her quest for healing encouraged the community around her and, with her daughter in 1978, she co-founded the Tamalpa Institute. Together, they created a non-profit research and educational arm of the San Francisco Dancer's Workshop that offers training in a creative process integrating psychology, body therapies, and education with dance, art, and drama, as a path toward healing and resolving social conflict. Her "Life/Art Process" inspired workshops dedicated to therapeutic, transformational, and psychological needs. Using tools of the body, movement, dialogue, voice, drawing, improvisation, performance, and reflection, she was able to provoke others to explore themselves and use art as a therapy to heal themselves. On occasion, participants return to the Mountain Home Studio to dance on the deck that started it all in Halprin's own home.

In the 1970s and 1980s she purely focused on collaborating with other individuals that were terminally ill or in recovery from an illness. In 1987, she was invited to the Cancer Support and Education Center to work with individuals with cancer. There she would lead them through a series of body awareness exercises and have them make visualizations of themselves through an artistic medium. These exercises aided their struggle to create energy. Over the years, she continued to work with terminally ill patients. One work she created that embodied her healing principles was Circle the Earth in spring of 1981. The "creativity is based on an open-ended score that guides the group in an experience of gradually intensifying creativity, and culminating in the actual performance." Halprin, along with her illness based dances, began making dances concerning critical and social issues. She no longer wanted spectators watching her work because she wasn't there to entertain. Instead, she wanted people who could realize the dancers were there for a purpose – "to accomplish something in ourselves and the world" which is why her dances had these political issues.
