= Mountain Artillery Group "Asiago" =

Inactive Italian Army mountain artillery unit

- Gruppo Artiglieria da Montagna "Asiago"
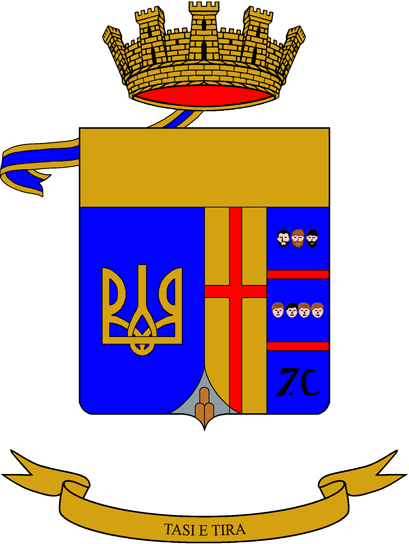
- Group coat of arms
- Active: 1 Oct. 1975 – 8 June 1991
- Country: Italy
- Branch: Italian Army
- Part of: Alpine Brigade "Tridentina"
- Garrison/HQ: Toblach
- Motto: "Tasi e tira"
- Anniversaries: 15 June 1918 – Second Battle of the Piave River
- Decorations: 1× Gold Medal of Military Valor

Insignia
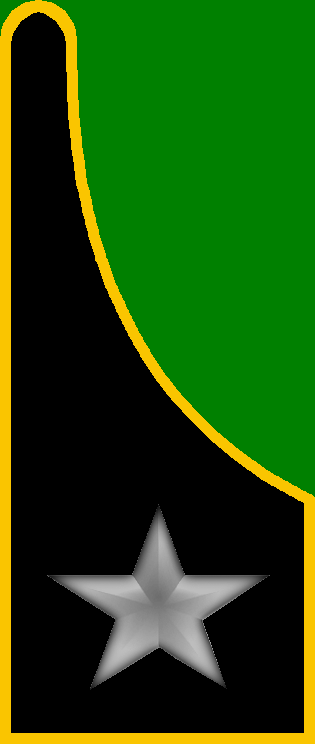
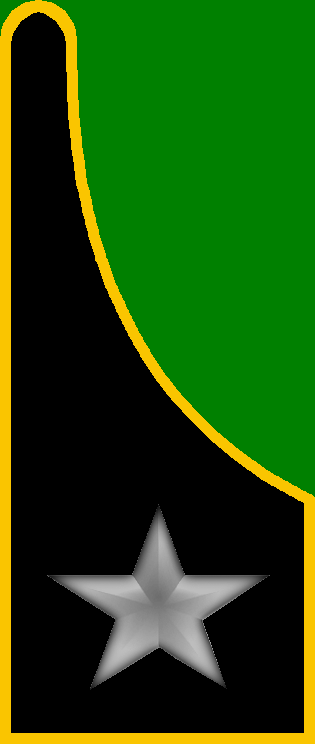
- Regimental gorget patches

The Mountain Artillery Group "Asiago" (Italian: Gruppo Artiglieria da Montagna "Asiago") is an inactive mountain artillery group of the Italian Army, which was based in Toblach in South Tyrol. The group consisted of mountain artillery batteries, had been formed in December 1914 and served in World War I on the Italian front. During World War II the batteries were assigned to the Alpine Artillery Group "Val Camonica" of the 2nd Alpine Artillery Regiment "Tridentina", which distinguished itself on the Eastern Front. The Mountain Artillery Group "Asiago" was formed in 1952 and assigned to the 2nd Mountain Artillery Regiment of the Alpine Brigade "Tridentina". In 1975 the group became an autonomous unit and was granted a flag and coat of arms. After the end of the Cold War the group was disbanded in 1991.

The Italian mountain artillery has served since its inception alongside the infantry's Alpini speciality, with whom the mountain artillery shares the distinctive Cappello Alpino. The regimental anniversary falls, as for all Italian Army artillery units, on June 15, the beginning of the Second Battle of the Piave River in 1918.

== History ==
=== World War I ===
In December 1914 the depot of the 2nd Mountain Artillery Regiment formed the Mountain Artillery Group "Genova", which consisted of the 28th, 29th, and 30th batteries. The group's personnel had been drafted from the city of Genoa and the group was equipped with 65/17 mod. 13 mountain guns. On 1 February 1915 the 2nd Mountain Artillery Regiment ceded the Group "Genova" to help form the 3rd Mountain Artillery Regiment. The Mountain Artillery Group "Genova" entered World War I with the following organization:

- (X) Mountain Artillery Group "Genova"
  - 28th Mountain Artillery Battery
  - 29th Mountain Artillery Battery
  - 30th Mountain Artillery Battery

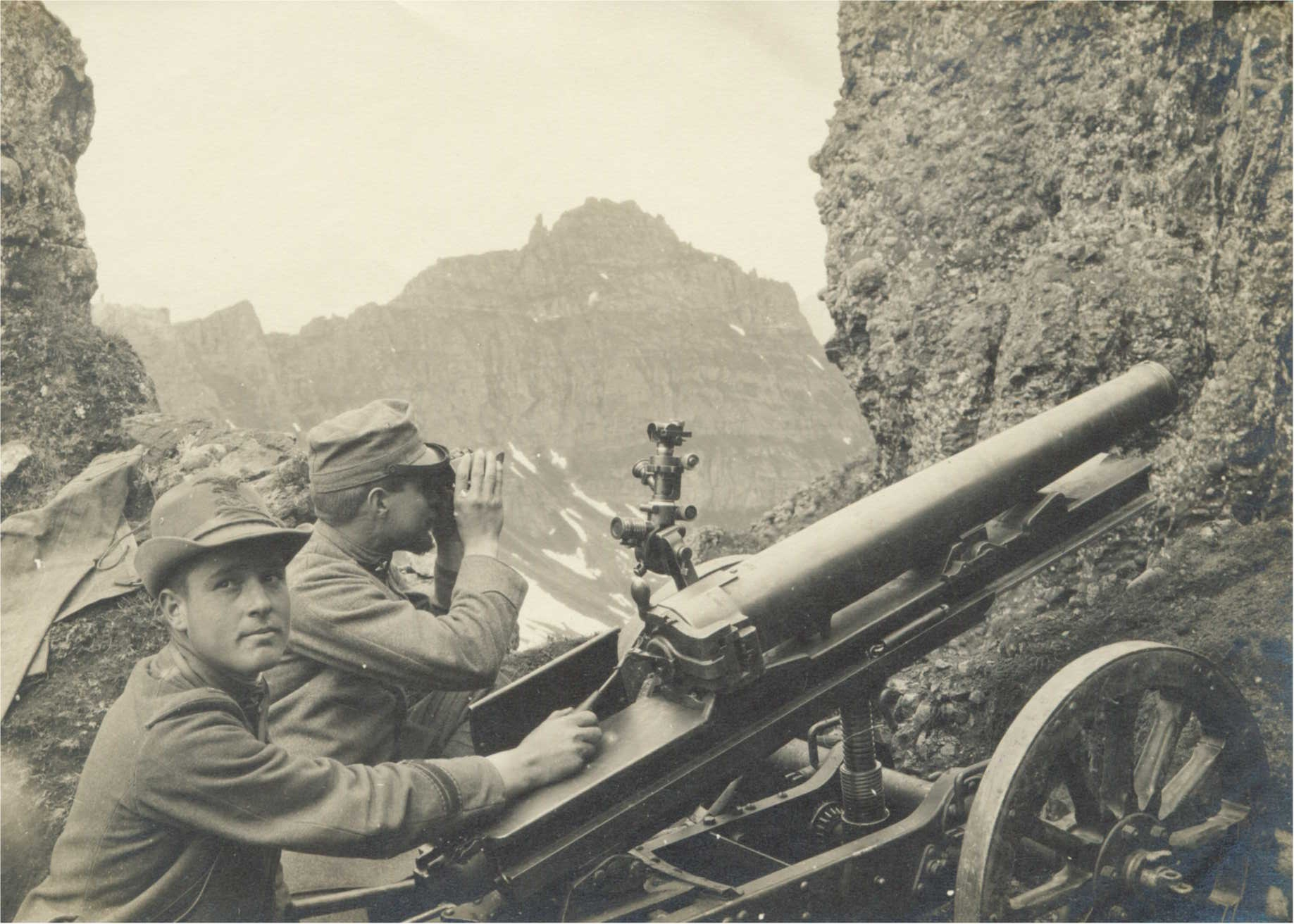
Italian mountain artillery troops firing with a 65/17 mod. 13 mountain gun from Monte Padon towards Austro-Hungarian positions on the Sass di Mezdi

During the war the regiment was broken up and its groups and batteries attached to different Alpini units. The Mountain Artillery Group "Genova" was deployed in 1915 on the Monte Altissimo and fought near Brentonico. In 1916 the group was on Monte Zugna and the nearby Buole Pass during the Battle of Asiago. In November 1916 the regiment formed the 60th Mountain Artillery Battery for the Group "Genova". In 1917 the group was on the Monte Cimone di Tonezza and then deployed in the Val d'Astico. In 1918 the group fought on Monte Pelle, before being deployed in the Val Lagarina. After the war the group was disbanded.

=== World War II ===
In 1939 the 2nd Alpine Artillery Regiment "Tridentina" mobilized the Alpine Artillery Group "Val Camonica" (28th, 29th, and 30th batteries) as support unit for the 5th Alpini Group, which was manned with reservists. The group was equipped with 75/13 mod. 15 mountain guns. In June 1940 the group participated in the invasion of France, during which the group advanced from the Varaita Valley into the Ubaye Valley. On 31 October 1940 the Group "Val Camonica" was disbanded. In spring 1942 the 2nd Alpine Division "Tridentina" was assigned, together with the 3rd Alpine Division "Julia" and 4th Alpine Division "Cuneense", to the Italian 8th Army, which was sent in summer 1942 to the Eastern Front. In preparation for the deployment to the Soviet Union the Alpine Artillery Group "Val Camonica", with the 28th and 29th batteries, was reformed in April 1942 and assigned to the regiment. The Group "Val Camonica" was equipped with 105/11 mod. 28 mountain guns. During its time in the Soviet Union the group consisted of the following units:

- Alpine Artillery Group "Val Camonica"
  - Command Unit
  - 28th Battery, with 4× 105/11 mod. 28 mountain guns
  - 29th Battery, with 4× 105/11 mod. 28 mountain guns
  - Ammunition and Supply Unit

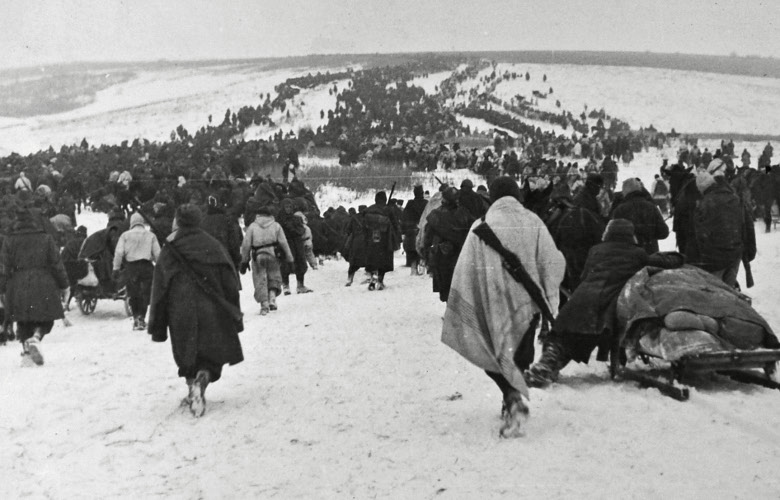
The retreat of the Italian 8th Army towards Nikolayevka

In July 1942 the three alpine division, grouped together in the Alpine Army Corps, arrived in Eastern Ukraine, from where they marched eastwards towards the Don river. The Italian 8th Army covered the left flank of the German 6th Army, which spearheaded the German summer offensive of 1942 towards Stalingrad. On 12 December 1942 the Red Army commenced Operation Little Saturn, which, in its first stage, attacked and encircled the Italian II Army Corps and XXXV Army Corps, to the southeast of the Alpine Army Corps. On 13 January 1943, the Red Army launched the second stage of Operation Little Saturn with the Voronezh Front encircling and destroying the Hungarian Second Army to the northwest of the Alpine Army Corps.

On the evening of 17 January 1943, the Alpine Army Corps commander, General Gabriele Nasci, ordered a full retreat. At this point only the 2nd Alpine Division "Tridentina" was still capable of conducting combat operations. The 40,000-strong mass of stragglers — Alpini and Italians from other commands, plus German and Hungarians — followed the Tridentina division, which led the way westwards to the Axis lines. As the Soviets had already occupied every village bitter battles had to be fought to clear the way. On the morning of 26 January, the spearheads of the Tridentina reached the hamlet of Nikolayevka, occupied by the Soviet 48th Guards Rifle Division. General Nasci ordered a frontal assault and at 9:30 am the Battle of Nikolayevka began with the 6th Alpini Regiment, the II Mixed Alpine Engineer Battalion, the Alpine Artillery Group "Bergamo", and three German Sturmgeschütz III leading the attack. By noon the Italian forces had reached the outskirts of the village and the Alpine Army Corps' Chief of Staff General Giulio Martinat brought up reinforcements: the 5th Alpini Regiment, and the remaining alpine artillery groups "Vicenza" and "Val Camonica", as well as the remnants of the Alpini Battalion "L'Aquila" of the "Julia" division. General Martinat fell during this assault.

By sunset the Alpini battalions were still struggling to break the reinforced Soviet lines and in a last effort to decide the battle before nightfall General Luigi Reverberi, commander of the Tridentina, ordered the remaining troops and stragglers, to assault the Soviet positions in a human wave attack. The assault managed to break open the Soviet lines and the Italian survivors managed to continue their retreat, which was no longer contested by Soviet forces. On 1 February 1943 the remnants of the Alpine Army Corps reached Axis lines. Only one third of the Tridentina had survived the battles on the Don river and the following retreat (approximately 4,250 survivors of 18,000 troops deployed).

For its bravery and sacrifice in the Soviet Union the 2nd Alpine Artillery Regiment "Tridentina" and its groups were awarded Italy's highest military the Gold Medal of Military Valor, which was affixed to the regiment's flag and is depicted on the regiment's coat of arms. The regiment was still in the process of being rebuilt, when the Armistice of Cassibile was announced on 8 September 1943. On 10 September the regiment and its groups were disbanded near Sterzing by invading German forces.

=== Cold War ===
On 1 May 1951 the 2nd Mountain Artillery Regiment was reformed in Brixen and assigned to the Alpine Brigade "Tridentina". On 1 July 1952 the regiment formed the Mountain Artillery Group "Asiago" in Toblach. Initially the Group "Asiago" consisted only of the 28th Battery, but on 10 November 1952 the 77th Battery was formed, which, like the 28th Battery, was equipped with M30 107mm mortars. The Group "Asiago" was named for the village of Asiago, which gave its name to the World War I Battle of Asiago, during which the Mountain Artillery Group "Genova", which consisted of the 28th, 29th, and 30th batteries, had fought. During World War II the 28th and 29th batteries had been assigned to the Alpine Artillery Group "Val Camonica", which served with the 2nd Alpine Artillery Regiment "Tridentina" on the Eastern Front.

In April 1956 the two batteries of the Group "Asiago" were equipped with Brandt AM-50 120mm mortars and on 25 February 1959 the regiment formed the 30th Battery for the Group "Asiago". In 1960 the regiment's groups were reorganized and the Brandt AM-50 120mm mortars of the Group "Asiago" were distributed among the regiment's three groups, with each group fielding after 1 June 1960 two batteries with 105/14 mod. 56 pack howitzers and one mortar battery with Brandt AM-50 120mm mortars. Afterwards the group consisted of the following units:

- Mountain Artillery Group "Asiago", in Toblach
  - Command Unit
  - 28th Battery, with 105/14 mod. 56 pack howitzers
  - 29th Battery, with 105/14 mod. 56 pack howitzers
  - 30th Battery, with Brandt AM-50 120mm mortars

On 1 April 1970 the group's mortar battery was equipped with 105/14 mod. 56 pack howitzers.

During the 1975 army reform the army disbanded the regimental level and newly independent battalions and groups were granted for the first time their own flags. On 30 September the 2nd Mountain Artillery Regiment was disbanded and the next day the Mountain Artillery Group "Asiago" became an autonomous unit and was assigned to the Alpine Brigade "Tridentina". The group consisted of a command, a command and services battery, and three batteries with 105/14 mod. 56 pack howitzers, with one of the batteries being mule-carried. At the time the group fielded 610 men (35 officers, 55 non-commissioned officers, and 520 soldiers).

On 12 November 1976 the President of the Italian Republic Giovanni Leone issued decree 846, which granted the Mountain Artillery Group "Asiago" a new flag. The Gold Medal of Military Valor, which had been awarded to the 2nd Alpine Artillery Regiment "Tridentina" for its service in World War II, was duplicated for the Group "Asiago" and affixed to the group's flag. The medal is also depicted on the group's coat of arms.

=== Recent times ===
After the end of the Cold War the Italian Army began to draw down its forces. On 8 June 1991 the Mountain Artillery Group "Asiago" was disbanded. On 19 June of the same year the flag of the Mountain Artillery Group "Asiago" was transferred to the Shrine of the Flags in the Vittoriano in Rome. Afterwards, the Heavy Field Artillery Group "Vicenza" renumbered its Light Anti-aircraft Battery as 28th Light Anti-aircraft Battery, which then carried on the traditions of the Group "Asiago".
