= List of World War II artillery =

This is a list of artillery of the Second World War ordered by name. Naval artillery is not included.

== A–I ==
- Army 20 cm rocket: Japanese 200 mm artillery rocket
- BL 4.5 inch: British 114 mm gun
- BL 5.5 inch: British 140 mm gun
- BL 7.2 inch: British 183 mm howitzer
- BL 60 pounder: British 127 mm gun
- Bofors 37 mm: Swedish 37 mm light antitank gun
- Bofors 40 mm gun: Swedish 40 mm antiaircraft gun
- Bofors Model 29: Swedish 75 mm antiaircraft gun
- Bofors Model 34: Swedish 75 mm mountain gun
- Brandt mle 27/31: French 81 mm mortar
- Brixia Model 35: 45 mm light mortar of Italy
- Canon Court de 105 M mle 1919 Schneider: French 105 mm mountain gun
- Canon Court de 105 M mle 1928 Schneider: French 105 mm mountain gun
- Canon de 25 mm SA mle 1934: French 25 mm light antitank gun
- Canon de 75 M mle 1919 Schneider: French 75 mm mountain gun
- Canon de 75 M mle 1928: French 75 mm mountain gun
- Canon de 105 court mle 1913: French 105 mm gun
- Canon de 105 court mle 1935 B: French 105 mm howitzer
- Canon de 105 court mle 1934 Schneider: French 105 mm gun
- Canon de 105 L mle 1936 Schneider: French 105 mm gun
- Canon de 155 mle 1917 CS: French 155 mm howitzer
- Canon de 155 GPF: French 155 mm gun
- Canon de 75 modele 1934: Belgian 75 mm mountain gun
- Canon d'Infanterie de 37 modèle 1916 TRP: French 37 mm infantry gun (fast-firing)
- FlaK 18: German 88 mm antiaircraft gun
- FlaK 30: German 20 mm antiaircraft gun
- FlaK 36: German 37 mm antiaircraft gun
- FlaK 37: German 37 mm antiaircraft gun
- FlaK 38 2 cm: German 20 mm antiaircraft gun
- FlaK 38 10.5 cm: German 105 mm antiaircraft gun
- FlaK 40 12.8 cm: German 128 mm antiaircraft gun
- FlaK 41 5 cm: German 50 mm antiaircraft gun
- FlaK 41 8.8 cm: German 88 mm antiaircraft/antitank gun
- FlaK 43: German 37 mm antiaircraft gun
- FlaK vierling 38: German quad 20 mm antiaircraft gun
- GebFlak 38: German 20 mm mountain antiaircraft gun
- Gustav: German 800 mm siege gun
- 7.5 cm IG 37: German 75 mm infantry gun
- Infantry Howitzer: British 94 mm howitzer

== K–N ==
- Katyusha: Soviet rocket artillery
- K 44: German 128 mm gun
- KwK 36: German 88 mm tank gun
- KwK 38(t): German designation of Skoda A7, used on the Panzer 38(t)
- KwK 42: German 75 mm tank gun
- KwK 43 L71: German long-barrel 88 mm tank gun
- Lance Grenades de 50 mm modèle 37
- Land Mattress: British 32 tube 76.2 mm rocket artillery
- leFH 18: German 105 mm howitzer
- leGebIG 18: German 75 mm mountain infantry gun
- leIG 18: German 75 mm infantry gun
- Little David: Aerial bomb firing siege mortar planned for combat service with the United States
- M1 57 mm Gun: American 57 mm antitank gun
- M1/M116 75 mm pack howitzer: American 75 mm mountain gun
- M1 90 mm gun: American 90 mm antiaircraft gun
- M1 120mm gun: American 120 mm antiaircraft gun
- 4.5-inch gun M1: American 4.5 Inch Gun
- M1 [M114] 155 mm Howitzer: American 155 mm howitzer
- M1 8-inch howitzer: American 203 mm howitzer
- M1 240 mm howitzer: American 240 mm howitzer
- M2 60 mm mortar: 60 mm light mortar of the US Army
- M2 90 mm gun: American 90 mm antiaircraft gun/Anti tank gun
- M2 105 mm howitzer: American 105 mm howitzer
- M2 155 mm gun: American 155 mm gun ("Long Tom")
- M2 4.2-inch mortar: American 107mm mortar
- M4 4.2-inch recoilless mortar: American 4.2 inch recoilless mortar
- M3 3-inch gun: American 76.2 mm antiaircraft gun
- M3 37 mm Gun: American 37 mm antitank gun
- M3 90 mm Gun: American 90 mm antiaircraft/antitank gun
- M5 3-inch gun: American 76.2 mm antitank gun
- M7 3-inch gun: American 76.2 mm antitank gun used in the M10 tank destroyer
- M8 4.5-inch rocket: American artillery rocket
- M18 recoilless rifle: Late-war American 57 mm recoilless rifle
- M20 recoilless rifle: Late-war American 75 mm recoilless rifle
- M1919 16 inch Coast Gun: American 16 inch coastal defense gun
- M1937 Howitzer: Soviet 152 mm howitzer
- M1938 Howitzer: Soviet 122 mm howitzer
- 76 mm divisional gun M1939 (USV): Soviet 76.2 mm gun
- M1942 Gun: Soviet 76.2 mm field gun and antitank gun
- M1943 Howitzer: Soviet 152 mm howitzer
- Morser Karl: 600mm German siege howitzer
- Mortaio da 81/14 Modello 35: standard Italian medium infantry mortar
- ML 3 Inch Mortar: British 76.2 mm mortar
- Nebelwerfer 41: German six tube 150 mm rocket launcher

== O–V ==
- Obice da 75/18 modello 34: Italian 75 mm mountain gun
- Obice da 210/22: Italian 210 mm howitzer
- PaK 35: German 37 mm light antitank gun
- PaK 36: German 37 mm light antitank gun
- PaK 38: German 50 mm antitank gun
- PaK 40: German 75 mm antitank gun
- PaK 41: German 75 mm antitank gun
- PaK 43: German 88 mm heavy antitank gun
- PaK 44: German 128 mm heavy antitank gun
- Panzerschreck: German antitank rocket launcher
- PIAT: British spring-launched antitank grenade launcher
- Polsten: Polish/British 20 mm anti-aircraft gun
- PzB 41: German 28 mm light antitank gun
- QF 2 Pounder: British 40 mm light tank gun and towed antitank gun
- QF 3 inch 20 cwt: British 76.2 mm antiaircraft gun
- QF 3.7 inch AA: British 94 mm antiaircraft gun
- QF 6 pounder: British 57 mm medium tank gun and towed antitank gun
- QF 17 pounder: British 76.2 mm tank gun and towed antitank gun
- QF 25 pounder: British 87.6 mm howitzer
- QF 3.7-inch mountain howitzer: British 94mm mountain gun
- QF 25 Pounder Short Mk 1: Australian derivation of the British 25 Pounder
- RCL 3.7 inch Gun: British 94 mm recoilless rifle
- sFH 18: German 150 mm howitzer
- sGrW 34: 81 mm medium mortar used by Germany during the war
- sIG 33: German 150 mm infantry gun
- Skoda A7: 37.2 mm L/47.8 tank gun used on the Panzer 38(t)/TNH P-S light tank
- Skoda K1: Czech 149 mm howitzer delivered to Turkey, Romania, and Yugoslavia
- Skoda K2: Czech 150 mm howitzer
- Skoda 47 mm Model 1936: Czech 47 mm antitank gun
- Skoda M1937: Czech 37 mm light antitank gun
- Type 01 Gun: Japanese 37 mm antitank gun
- Type 4 20 cm Rocket Launcher
- Type 11 Gun: Japanese 37 mm infantry gun
- Type 35 Gun: Japanese 75 mm infantry gun
- Type 88 Gun: Japanese 75 mm antiaircraft gun
- Type 89 grenade discharger: Japanese 50 mm light mortar, known by Americans as the Knee Mortar
- Type 92 battalion gun: Japanese 70 mm infantry and mountain gun
- Type 96 15 cm howitzer: Japanese 149 mm heavy artillery
- vz. 36 4.7 cm: Czech 47 mm antitank gun
- vz. 33 14.9 cm: Czech 149 mm howitzer delivered to Turkey, Romania, and Yugoslavia
- vz. 37 15 cm: Czech 150 mm howitzer
- wz. 1917 155 mm Polish howitzer
- wz. 02/26 75 mm Polish infantry gun
- wz. 1914/19P 100 mm Polish howitzer
- wz. 1929 105 mm Polish long range gun
- wz. 36 37 mm Polish anti-tank gun improved, manufactured in Poland under Swedish Bofors licence; some delivered to Spain
- wz. 31 81 mm Polish mortar developed from the French Stockes

== See also ==
- List of weapons
- List of artillery
- List of World War II weapons
