= 2nd Mountain Artillery Regiment (Italy) =

Inactive Italian Army mountain artillery unit

- 2° Reggimento Artiglieria da Montagna
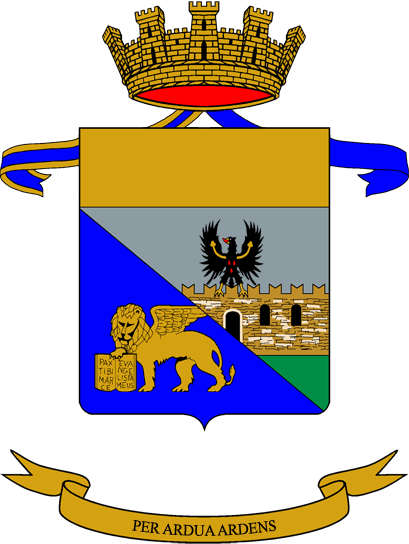
- Regimental coat of arms
- Active: 1 Feb. 1915 – 10 Sept. 1943; 1 May 1951 – 25 June 2015
- Country: Italy
- Branch: Italian Army
- Part of: Alpine Brigade "Tridentina"
- Garrison/HQ: Trento
- Motto: "Per ardua ardens"
- Anniversaries: 15 June 1918 – Second Battle of the Piave River
- Decorations: 1× Gold Medal of Military Valor; 1× Bronze Medal of Military Valor

Insignia
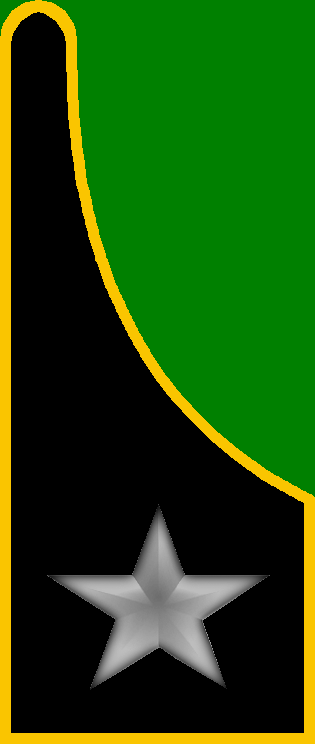
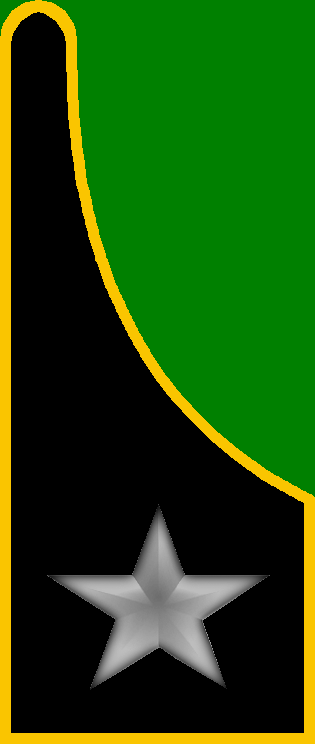
- Regimental gorget patches

The 2nd Mountain Artillery Regiment (Italian: 2° Reggimento Artiglieria da Montagna) is an inactive mountain artillery regiment of the Italian Army, which was based in Trento in Trentino. The regiment was formed in 1915 by the Royal Italian Army as 3rd Mountain Artillery Regiment. In World War I the regiment's groups and batteries served on the Italian front.

In 1926 the 3rd Mountain Artillery Regiment switched numbers with the then 2nd Mountain Artillery Regiment, but retained its flag, traditions, and place as the third oldest Italian mountain artillery regiment. In 1935 the regiment was assigned to the 2nd Alpine Division "Tridentina", with which it served during World War II in the invasion of France and the Greco-Italian War. In summer 1942 the division was transferred to the Soviet Union, where it was destroyed in winter 1942–43 during the Soviet Operation Little Saturn. The remnants of the division were repatriated in spring 1943 and invading German forces disbanded the division and its regiments after the announcement of the Armistice of Cassibile on 8 September 1943.

The regiment was reformed in 1951 and assigned to the Alpine Brigade "Tridentina". In 1975 the regiment was split into two mountain artillery groups and its flag and traditions were assigned to the Mountain Artillery Group "Vicenza". In 1991 the group was assigned to the 4th Alpine Army Corps and one year later the group entered the reformed regiment. In 1997 the regiment was assigned to the army's Artillery Grouping. The regiment was disbanded in 2015. The Italian mountain artillery has served since its inception alongside the infantry's Alpini speciality, with whom the mountain artillery shares the distinctive Cappello Alpino. The regimental anniversary falls, as for all Italian Army artillery regiments, on June 15, the beginning of the Second Battle of the Piave River in 1918.

== History ==
=== World War I ===
On 1 February 1915 the 3rd Mountain Artillery Regiment was formed in the city of Bergamo. The new regiment consisted of the Mountain Artillery Group "Oneglia" in Oneglia, which had been ceded by the 1st Mountain Artillery Regiment, the Mountain Artillery Group "Genova" in Genoa, which had been formed in December 1914 by the 2nd Mountain Artillery Regiment, the Mountain Artillery Group "Bergamo" in Bergamo, which had been ceded by the 2nd Mountain Artillery Regiment, and the Mountain Artillery Group "Como" in Como, which had been formed in December 1911 by the 1st Mountain Artillery Regiment. All four groups were equipped with 65/17 mod. 13 mountain guns. At the outbreak of World War I the regiment formed the 59th and 61st batteries and entered the war with the organization depicted in the following table:

3rd Mountain Artillery Regiment, in Bergamo
Depot in Oneglia	Depot in Genoa	Depot in Bergamo	Depot in Como
(IX) Mountain Artillery Group "Oneglia": 25th Mountain Artillery Battery; 26th Mountain Artillery Battery; 27th Mountain Artillery Battery; 59th Mountain Artillery Battery	(X) Mountain Artillery Group "Genova": 28th Mountain Artillery Battery; 29th Mountain Artillery Battery; 30th Mountain Artillery Battery; ^{Note 3}	(XI) Mountain Artillery Group "Bergamo": 31st Mountain Artillery Battery; 32nd Mountain Artillery Battery; 33rd Mountain Artillery Battery; 61st Mountain Artillery Battery	(XII) Mountain Artillery Group "Como": 34th Mountain Artillery Battery; 35th Mountain Artillery Battery; 36th Mountain Artillery Battery; ^{Note 3}

Note 3: The "Genova" group's 60th Mountain Artillery Battery and the "Como" group's 62nd Mountain Artillery Battery were not raised until November 1916 for lack of available 65/17 mod. 13 cannons.

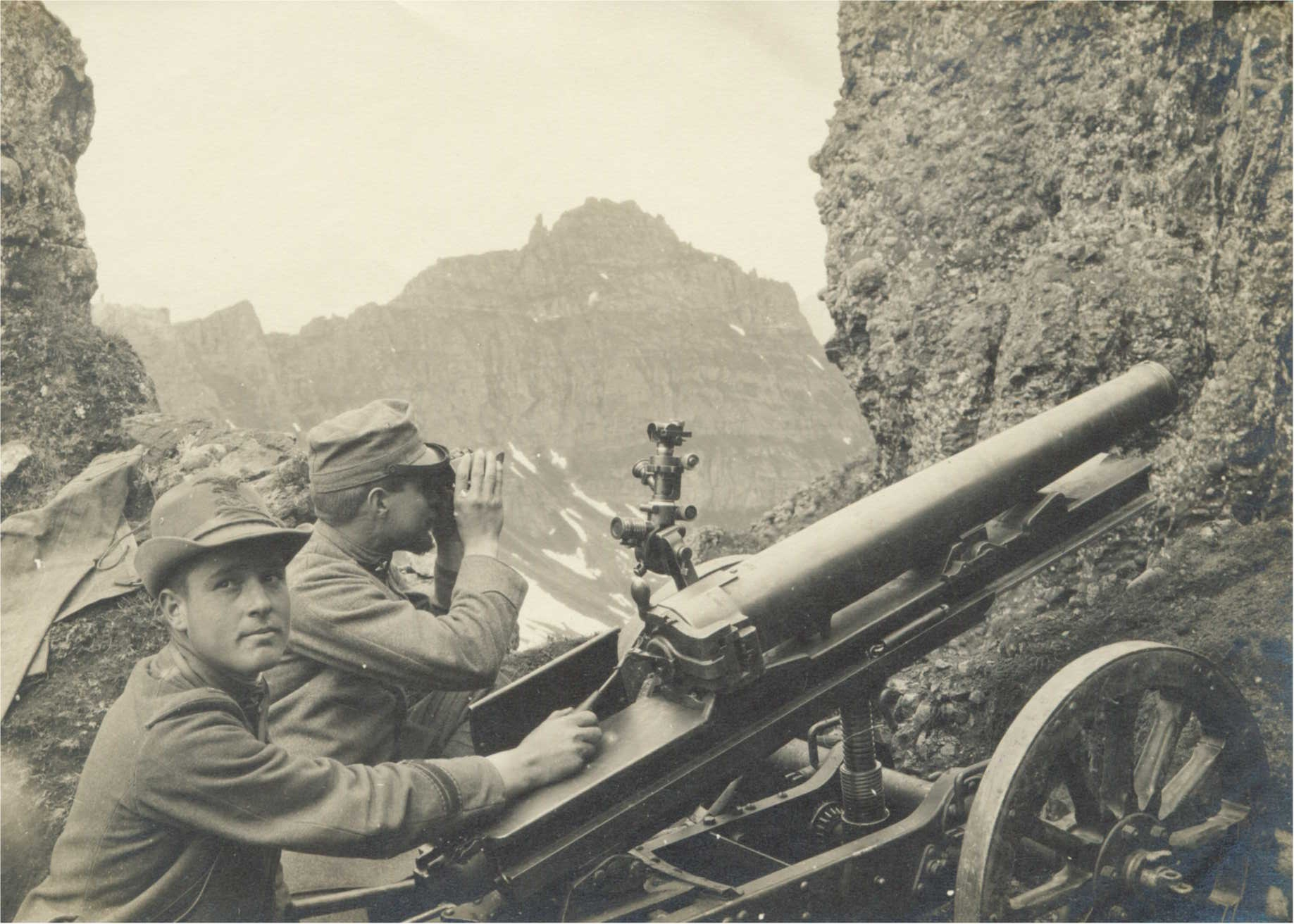
Italian mountain artillery troops firing with a 65/17 mod. 13 mountain gun from Monte Padon towards Austro-Hungarian positions on the Sass di Mezdi

During the war the regiment's depots formed the commands of the 7th Mountain Artillery Grouping and the commands of 17 mountain artillery groups: XVII (72nd, 73rd, 74th batteries), XVIII (75th, 76th, 77th batteries), XXIV (56th, 60th, 62nd batteries), XXVII (88th, 89th, 90th batteries), XXXI (97th, 98th, 99th batteries), XXXII, XL, XLV, XLVI, XLVII, XLVIII, LV, LVI, LVII, LIX, LX, and LXVI. The regiment's depots also formed 44 mountain artillery batteries, two commands of siege groups and 19 siege batteries.

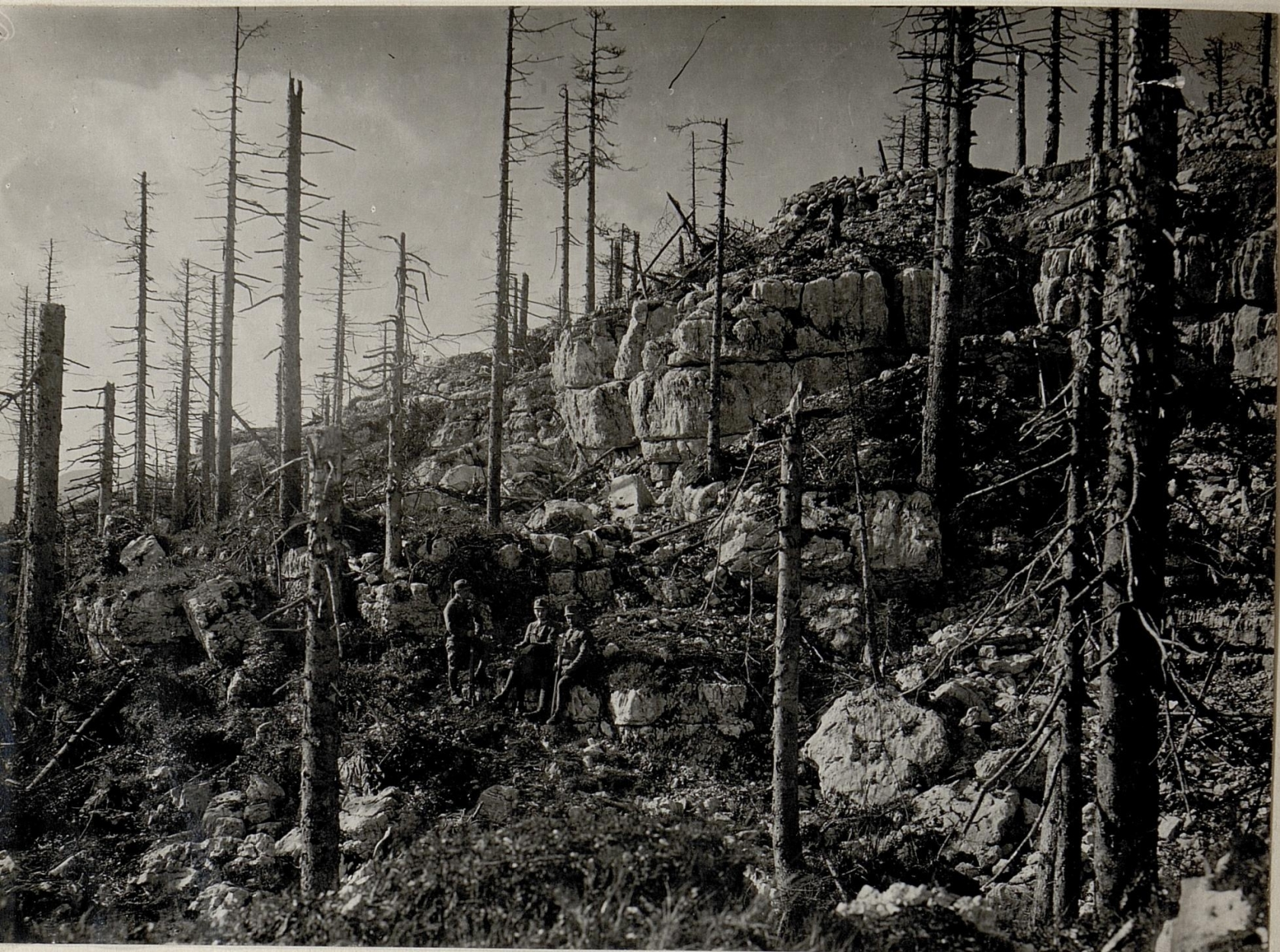
Austro-Hungarian troops on Monte Zebio 1916–17

During the war the regiment was broken up and its groups and batteries attached to different Alpini units. The Mountain Artillery Group "Oneglia" fought in 1915 in the Val d'Assa and then on Monte Coston. In 1916 the group was deployed on the Melette, where it fought on the slopes of Monte Fior during the Battle of Asiago. In 1917 the group remained initially on the Asiago plateau, where it fought for control of Monte Zebio. After the Battle of Caporetto the group was transferred to the Monte Grappa massif, where it fought on Monte Tomba and Monfenera during the Battle of Monte Grappa. In 1918 the group fought at Fagarè during the Second Battle of the Piave River and in October participated in the Battle of Vittorio Veneto. In 1919 the group was deployed to Italian Libya to help subdue the local population.

The Mountain Artillery Group "Genova" was deployed in 1915 on the Monte Altissimo and fought near Brentonico. In 1916 the group was on Monte Zugna and the nearby Buole Pass during the Battle of Asiago. In 1917 the group was on the Monte Cimone di Tonezza and then deployed in the Val d'Astico. In 1918 the group fought on Monte Pelle, before being deployed in the Val Lagarina.

The Mountain Artillery Group "Bergamo" was from 1915 to 1917 on the Krn and only after the Battle of Caporetto in October and November 1917 the group moved left the area of the Krn. In 1918 the group was on the Cima Presanella, fought on the Monticello Pass and on the Cavento Pass below the Corno di Cavento.

The Mountain Artillery Group "Como" was deployed in 1915 on the Sass de Stria and then the Monte Piana. In 1916 the group was in the Tofane group. In 1917 the group fought on the Piccolo Lagazuoi and then on the Monte Grappa massif during the Battle of Monte Grappa. In 1918 the group was at Roncade, then on the Monte Coston, again on Monte Grappa, and then deployed on the Montello. In October 1918 the group participated in the Battle of Vittorio Veneto.

=== Interwar years ===
In 1919 the regiment was reduced to the groups "Oneglia", "Bergamo" and XXIX, each with three batteries with 75/13 mod. 15 mountain guns. On 21 February 1921 the mountain groups lost their names and the regiment consisted of the I, II, and III groups. On 1 July 1923 the regiment formed the IV Group with 100/17 mod. 14 howitzers.

On 11 March 1926 the Royal Italian Army reorganized its artillery. As Alpini units were traditionally numbered from West to East the army decided that the 2nd Mountain Artillery Regiment and 3rd Mountain Artillery Regiment should swap numbers. Furthermore, the army decided that mountain artillery groups should again be named and not numbered and that the groups with 100/17 mod. 14 howitzers should be transferred to the field artillery. The mountain artillery regiments also redistributed their groups and so the new 2nd Mountain Artillery Regiment consisted after the swap of the groups "Bergamo" and "Vicenza", and received from the new 3rd Mountain Artillery Regiment that regiment's III Group, which was redesignated Mountain Artillery Group "Belluno". At the same time the new 2nd Mountain Artillery Regiment transferred its own I Group to the 1st Mountain Artillery Regiment, which upon entering the 1st Mountain Artillery Regiment was redesignated Mountain Artillery Group "Aosta", and transferred its IV Group with 100/17 mod. 14 howitzers to the 9th Field Artillery Regiment. On 1 December 1929 the regiment received the Group "Aosta" from the 1st Mountain Artillery Regiment and transferred its Group "Belluno" to the 3rd Mountain Artillery Regiment. Afterwards the 2nd Mountain Artillery Regiment consisted of the Group "Aosta", with the 4th, 5th, and 6th batteries, the Group "Vicenza", with the 19th and 20th batteries, and the Group "Bergamo", with the 31st, 32nd, and 33rd batteries. The regiment was assigned to the II Alpine Brigade, which also included the 5th Alpini Regiment and 6th Alpini Regiment.

On 1 January 1934 the Group "Aosta" returned to the 1st Mountain Artillery Regiment and in the course of the year the 2nd Mountain Artillery Regiment formed the 21st Battery for the Group "Vicenza". On 27 October 1934 the II Alpine Brigade changed its name to II Superior Alpine Command and the regiment was renamed 2nd Alpine Artillery Regiment. In December of the same year the command was given the name "Tridentina". On 10 September 1935 the II Superior Alpine Command "Tridentina" was renamed 2nd Alpine Division "Tridentina" and consequently the regiment was renamed 2nd Alpine Artillery Regiment "Tridentina".

On 31 December 1935 the depot of the regiment in Bergamo formed the 5th Alpine Artillery Regiment "Pusteria". To ready the new regiment quickly for the Second Italo-Ethiopian War the other alpine artillery regiments transferred existing batteries temporarily to the new regiment. In case of the 2nd Alpine Artillery Regiment "Tridentina" the 21st Battery of the Group "Vicenza" was transferred to the newly formed Alpine Artillery Group "Lanzo", but returned to the regiment, when the Group "Lanzo" was disbanded after the war on 12 April 1937. In 1936 the regiment moved from Bergamo to Meran. On 25 September 1937 the regiment's Group "Vicenza" ceded its 21st Battery permanently to the reformed the Group "Lanzo".

On 20 March 1939, the 19th Battery of the Group "Vincenza" was mobilized and the personnel, dressed in civilian clothes, embarked in the port of La Spezia for Spain. After arriving on 25 March in Cádiz the Italian "volunteers" joined the Corpo Truppe Volontarie, which fought on the Nationalist side in the Spanish Civil War. However the end of hostilities on 1 April meant that the battery did not see any combat.

=== World War II ===
In 1939 the regiment mobilized the Alpine Artillery Group "Val Camonica" (28th, 29th, and 30th batteries) and the Alpine Artillery Group "Val d'Adige" (45th, 75th, 76th, and 77th batteries). The two groups supported the Alpini groups, which were manned with reservists. On 10 June 1940, the day Italy entered World War II, the regiment consisted of a command, command unit, the Group "Vicenza" (19th and 20th batteries), and the Group "Bergamo" (31st, 32nd, and 33rd batteries). Both groups were equipped with 75/13 mod. 15 mountain guns. The regiment was assigned, together with the 5th Alpini Regiment and 6th Alpini Regiment, to the 2nd Alpine Division "Tridentina". In June 1940 the division participated in the invasion of France in the Little St Bernard Pass sector.

On 31 October 1940 the Group "Val Camonica" was disbanded and the following month the 2nd Alpine Division "Tridentina" was transferred to Albania to shore up the crumbling Italian front during the Greco-Italian War. In Albania the Group "Vicenza" was reinforced with the 50th Battery of the Group "Val Chisone" of the 1st Alpine Artillery Regiment "Taurinense". On 23 November the division entered the front in the upper Devoll valley, but in December the Greek counter-offensive forced the division to retreat. On 15 March 1941 the Group "Vicenza" was reinforced with the 45th Battery of the Group "Val d’Adige". In April 1941, during the Battle of Greece, the division pursued the retreating Greek forces to Leskovik and Ersekë. In July 1941 the division was repatriated.

For its conduct and service on the Greek front the 2nd Alpine Artillery Regiment "Tridentina" was awarded a Bronze Medal of Military Valor, which was affixed to the regiment's flag and is depicted on the regiment's coat of arms.

On 15 November 1941 the depot of the 1st Alpine Artillery Regiment "Taurinense" formed the 6th Alpine Artillery Regiment, which received the Alpine Artillery Group "Val d'Adige" from the 2nd Alpine Artillery Regiment "Tridentina". In spring 1942 the 2nd Alpine Division "Tridentina" was assigned, together with the 3rd Alpine Division "Julia" and 4th Alpine Division "Cuneense", to the Italian 8th Army, which was sent in summer 1942 to the Eastern Front. In preparation for the deployment to the Soviet Union the Alpine Artillery Group "Val Camonica", with the 28th and 29th batteries, was reformed in April 1942 and assigned to the regiment. The Group "Val Camonica" was equipped with 105/11 mod. 28 mountain guns. The regiment also received the 56th and 59th anti-aircraft batteries with 20/65 mod. 35 anti-aircraft guns, and after arriving in the Soviet Union the regiment received in September 1942 the 76th Anti-tank Battery with Pak 97/38 anti-tank guns. During its time in the Soviet Union the regiment consisted of the following units:

- 2nd Alpine Artillery Regiment "Tridentina"
  - Command Unit
  - Alpine Artillery Group "Vicenza"
    - Command Unit
    - 19th Battery, with 4× 75/13 mod. 15 mountain guns
    - 20th Battery, with 4× 75/13 mod. 15 mountain guns
    - 45th Battery, with 4× 75/13 mod. 15 mountain guns
    - Ammunition and Supply Unit
  - Alpine Artillery Group "Bergamo"
    - Command Unit
    - 35th Battery, with 4× 75/13 mod. 15 mountain guns
    - 36th Battery, with 4× 75/13 mod. 15 mountain guns
    - 39th Battery, with 4× 75/13 mod. 15 mountain guns
    - Ammunition and Supply Unit
  - Alpine Artillery Group "Val Camonica"
    - Command Unit
    - 28th Battery, with 4× 105/11 mod. 28 mountain guns
    - 29th Battery, with 4× 105/11 mod. 28 mountain guns
    - Ammunition and Supply Unit
  - 56th Anti-aircraft Battery, with 8× 20/65 mod. 35 anti-aircraft guns
  - 59th Battery, with 8× 20/65 mod. 35 anti-aircraft guns
  - 76th Anti-tank Battery, with 6× Pak 97/38 anti-tank guns

The groups "Bergamo" and "Vicenza" fielded 1,296 men (32 officers, 32 non-commissioned officers, and 1,232 soldiers), which operated twelve 75/13 mod. 15 mountain guns. Being an alpine unit the group's main mode of transport were mules, of which the group had 720.

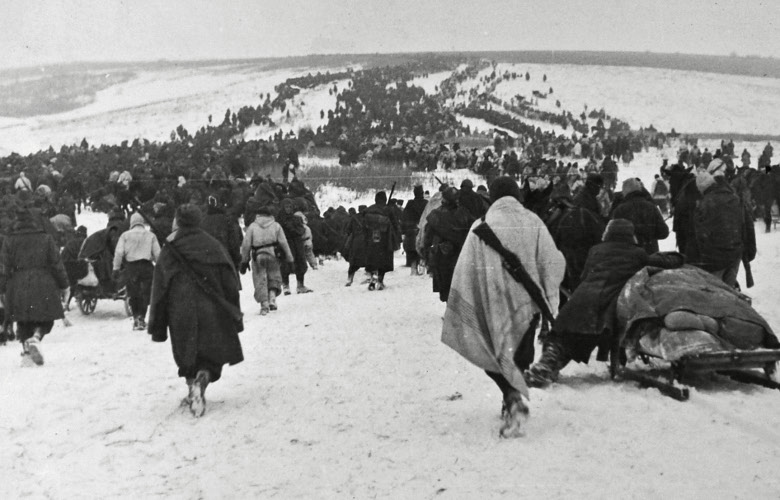
The retreat of the Italian 8th Army towards Nikolayevka

In July 1942 the three alpine division, grouped together in the Alpine Army Corps, arrived in Eastern Ukraine, from where they marched eastwards towards the Don river. The Italian 8th Army covered the left flank of the German 6th Army, which spearheaded the German summer offensive of 1942 towards Stalingrad. On 12 December 1942 the Red Army commenced Operation Little Saturn, which, in its first stage, attacked and encircled the Italian II Army Corps and XXXV Army Corps, to the southeast of the Alpine Army Corps. On 13 January 1943, the Red Army launched the second stage of Operation Little Saturn with the Voronezh Front encircling and destroying the Hungarian Second Army to the northwest of the Alpine Army Corps.

On the evening of 17 January 1943, the Alpine Army Corps commander, General Gabriele Nasci, ordered a full retreat. At this point only the 2nd Alpine Division "Tridentina" was still capable of conducting combat operations. The 40,000-strong mass of stragglers — Alpini and Italians from other commands, plus German and Hungarians — followed the Tridentina division, which led the way westwards to the Axis lines. As the Soviets had already occupied every village bitter battles had to be fought to clear the way. On the morning of 26 January, the spearheads of the Tridentina reached the hamlet of Nikolayevka, occupied by the Soviet 48th Guards Rifle Division. General Nasci ordered a frontal assault and at 9:30 am the Battle of Nikolayevka began with the 6th Alpini Regiment, the II Mixed Alpine Engineer Battalion, the Alpine Artillery Group "Bergamo", and three German Sturmgeschütz III leading the attack. By noon the Italian forces had reached the outskirts of the village and the Alpine Army Corps' Chief of Staff General Giulio Martinat brought up reinforcements: the 5th Alpini Regiment, and the remaining alpine artillery groups "Vicenza" and "Val Camonica", as well as the remnants of the Alpini Battalion "L'Aquila" of the "Julia" division. General Martinat fell during this assault.

By sunset the Alpini battalions were still struggling to break the reinforced Soviet lines and in a last effort to decide the battle before nightfall General Luigi Reverberi, commander of the Tridentina, ordered the remaining troops and stragglers, to assault the Soviet positions in a human wave attack. The assault managed to break open the Soviet lines and the Italian survivors managed to continue their retreat, which was no longer contested by Soviet forces. On 1 February 1943 the remnants of the Alpine Army Corps reached Axis lines. Only one third of the Tridentina had survived the battles on the Don river and the following retreat (approximately 4,250 survivors of 18,000 troops deployed).

For its bravery and sacrifice in the Soviet Union the 2nd Alpine Artillery Regiment "Tridentina" was awarded Italy's highest military the Gold Medal of Military Valor, which was affixed to the regiment's flag and is depicted on the regiment's coat of arms. The regiment was still in the process of being rebuilt, when the Armistice of Cassibile was announced on 8 September 1943. On 10 September the regiment was disbanded near Sterzing by invading German forces.

=== Cold War ===
On 1 April 1948 the Mountain Artillery Group "Bergamo" was reformed in Bolzano and assigned to the IV Territorial Military Command. The group was equipped with 75/13 mod. 15 mountain guns and consisted of the 31st, 32nd, and 33rd batteries. On 1 May 1951 the 2nd Mountain Artillery Regiment was reformed in Brixen and assigned to the Alpine Brigade "Tridentina", which had been formed the same day. The Mountain Artillery Group "Bergamo" entered the reformed regiment, which consisted of a command, a command unit, the Group "Bergamo", the Anti-tank Group "Tridentina" with QF 6-pounder anti-tank guns, and a Light Anti-aircraft Group with 40/56 anti-aircraft autocannons. After its formation the regiment's command moved from Brixen to Bolzano. In June of the same year the regiment formed a maneuver group with 100/17 mod. 14 howitzers in Meran and on 13 August the regiment formed the 35th Battery for the Group "Bergamo".

On 1 July 1952 the Mountain Artillery Group "Asiago" was formed in Toblach. Initially the group "Asiago" consisted only of the 28th Battery, but on 10 November 1952 the 77th Battery was formed, which, like the 28th Battery, was equipped with M30 107mm mortars. The Group "Asiago" was named for the village of Asiago, which gave its name to the World War I Battle of Asiago, during which the Mountain Artillery Group "Genova", which consisted of the 28th, 29th, and 30th batteries, had fought. During World War II the 28th and 29th batteries had been assigned to the Alpine Artillery Group "Val Camonica", which served with the 2nd Alpine Artillery Regiment "Tridentina" on the Eastern Front.

On 14 December 1952 the Anti-tank Group "Tridentina" was disbanded and its personnel used to from a recruits training group. In the course of the year 1952 the Group "Bergamo" moved from Bolzano to Bruneck, while the maneuver group with 100/17 mod. 14 howitzers moved from Meran to Brixen, where the group was renamed Mountain Artillery Group "Verona" on 26 December 1952. Five day later, on 31 December 1952, the Group "Bergamo" was renamed Mountain Artillery Group "Vicenza". The next day, on 1 January 1953, batteries of the disbanded Group "Bergamo" were renumbered 19th, 20th, and 21st, while the 32nd Battery retained its number.

On 1 July 1953 the 5th Mountain Artillery Regiment was reformed in Meran and on 13 August 1953 the 2nd Mountain Artillery Regiment ceded the 32nd Battery, which had been part of the Group "Bergamo", to the 5th Mountain Artillery Regiment to help reform the Group "Bergamo", which was reformed on 10 September 1953. On 1 September of the same year the 2nd Mountain Artillery Regiment transferred its recruits training group to the 5th Mountain Artillery Regiment. Initially only the Group "Bergamo" consisted of batteries with traditional mountain battery numbers, but on 15 March 1955 the army's General Staff ordered that also the groups with 100/17 mod. 14 howitzers and M30 107mm mortars should receive traditional mountain battery numbers. Consequently, all the batteries of the regiment were renumbered and afterwards the regiment consisted of the following groups and batteries:

- 2nd Mountain Artillery Regiment, in Bolzano
  - Command Unit
  - Mountain Artillery Group "Vicenza", in Bruneck
    - Command Unit
    - 19th, 20th, and 21st batteries with 75/13 mod. 15 mountain guns
  - Mountain Artillery Group "Asiago", in Toblach
    - Command Unit
    - 28th and 29th batteries with M30 107mm mortars
  - Mountain Artillery Group "Verona", in Brixen
    - Command Unit
    - 75th and 76th batteries with 100/17 mod. 14 howitzers
  - Light Anti-aircraft Group, in Bolzano
    - Command Unit
    - 1st, 2nd, and 3rd batteries with 40/56 anti-aircraft autocannons

On 1 January 1956 the Light Anti-aircraft Group was transferred to the 4th Heavy Anti-aircraft Artillery Regiment and in April of the same year the two batteries of the Group "Asiago" were equipped with Brandt AM-50 120mm mortars. On 1 July 1956 the regiment formed a Light Aircraft Section with L-21B artillery observation planes, which in 1958 was transferred to the brigade command. On 25 February 1959 the regiment formed the 30th Battery for the Group "Asiago" and on 1 April of the same year the Group "Vicenza" was equipped with 105/14 mod. 56 pack howitzers. Also during the same year the Group "Verona" moved from Brixen to Bolzano.

In 1960 the regiment's groups were reorganized and the Brandt AM-50 120mm mortars of the Group "Asiago" were distributed among the regiment's three groups, with each group fielding after 1 June 1960 two batteries with 105/14 mod. 56 pack howitzers and one mortar battery with Brandt AM-50 120mm mortars. Afterwards the regiment consisted of the following units:

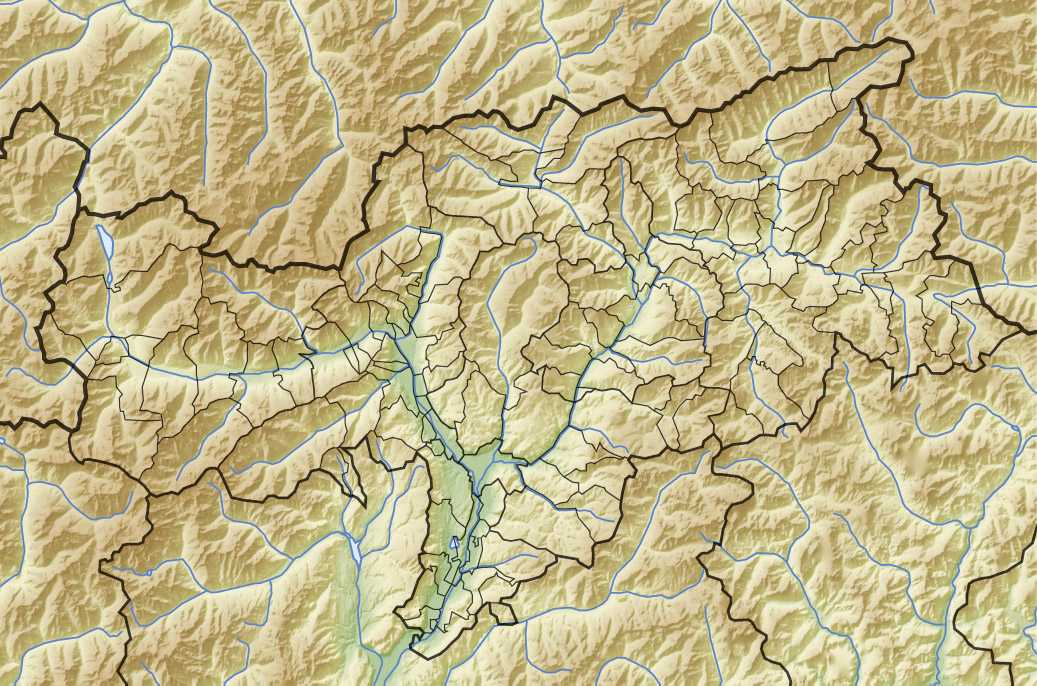
Location of the regiment and its groups in South Tyrol at the end of 1961
- 2nd Mountain Artillery Regiment, in Bolzano
  - Command Unit
  - Mountain Artillery Group "Vicenza", in Bruneck
    - Command Unit
    - 19th Battery, with 105/14 mod. 56 pack howitzers
    - 20th Battery, with 105/14 mod. 56 pack howitzers
    - 21st Battery, with Brandt AM-50 120mm mortars
  - Mountain Artillery Group "Asiago", in Toblach
    - Command Unit
    - 28th Battery, with 105/14 mod. 56 pack howitzers
    - 29th Battery, with 105/14 mod. 56 pack howitzers
    - 30th Battery, with Brandt AM-50 120mm mortars
  - Mountain Artillery Group "Verona", in Bolzano
    - Command Unit
    - 75th Battery, with 105/14 mod. 56 pack howitzers
    - 76th Battery, with 105/14 mod. 56 pack howitzers
    - 77th Battery, with Brandt AM-50 120mm mortars

On 1 April 1970 all the mountain groups' mortar batteries were equipped with 105/14 mod. 56 pack howitzers.

During the 1975 army reform the army disbanded the regimental level and newly independent battalions and groups were granted for the first time their own flags. On 15 September 1975 the Group "Verona" was disbanded. On 30 September 1975 the 2nd Mountain Artillery Regiment was disbanded and the next day its remaining two groups became autonomous units and were assigned to the Alpine Brigade "Tridentina". The groups consisted of a command, a command and services battery, and three batteries with 105/14 mod. 56 pack howitzers, with one of the batteries being mule-carried. At the time each of the two groups fielded 610 men (35 officers, 55 non-commissioned officers, and 520 soldiers).

On 12 November 1976 the President of the Italian Republic Giovanni Leone issued decree 846, which assigned the flag and traditions of the 2nd Mountain Artillery Regiment to the Mountain Artillery Group "Vicenza", and granted the Mountain Artillery Group "Asiago" a new flag. On 28 September 1982 the Group "Vicenza" was equipped with M114 155mm howitzers and in 1983 the group moved from Bruneck to Elvas in the base, which had been vacated by the disbanding of the 1st Heavy Artillery Group "Adige". The same year the Group "Vicenza" formed a light anti-aircraft battery, which was equipped with M55 Quadmounts.

=== Recent times ===
On 2 April 1991 the batteries of the Mountain Artillery Group "Vicenza" in Elvas were disbanded and the flag of the 2nd Mountain Artillery Regiment was transferred to Trento, where it supplanted the flag of the 184th Heavy Self-propelled Field Artillery Group "Filottrano", which one week later, on 9 April 1991, arrived in Gradisca d'Isonzo, where it supplanted the next day the flag of the 46th Self-propelled Field Artillery Group "Trento", whose flag was subsequently transferred on 5 June of the same year to the Shrine of the Flags in the Vittoriano in Rome. Through the move the Group "Vicenza", which was now equipped with FH-70 155mm howitzers, became a support unit of the 4th Alpine Army Corps and was renamed Heavy Field Artillery Group "Vicenza". The same year, on 8 June, the Group "Asiago" was disbanded, followed on 27 July the Alpine Brigade "Orobica". Three days later, on 30 July 1991, the disbanded brigade's artillery group, the Mountain Artillery Group "Bergamo", joined the Alpine Brigade "Tridentina". After the Group "Asiago" had been disbanded, the Group "Vicenza", to carry on the traditions of the Mountain Artillery Group "Asiago", gave the number 28th to its Light Anti-aircraft Battery.

On 3 September 1992 the Heavy Field Artillery Group "Vicenza" lost its autonomy and the next day the group entered the reformed 2nd Heavy Field Artillery Regiment "Vicenza". On 1 January 1996 the regiment was renamed 2nd Alpine Artillery Regiment. The regiment consisted now of the following units:

- 2nd Alpine Artillery Regiment, in Trento
  - Command and Services Battery
  - 28th Light Anti-aircraft Battery, with Stinger man-portable air-defense systems
  - Group "Vicenza"
    - 19th Battery, with FH-70 155mm howitzers
    - 20th Battery, with FH-70 155mm howitzers
    - 21st Battery, with FH-70 mod. 56 155mm howitzers
    - 45th Fire and Technical Support Battery

On 1 January 1997 the regiment was assigned to the army's Artillery Grouping. On 1 January 2002 the regiment was renamed 2nd Field Artillery Regiment "Vicenza" and the same year the regiment disbanded the 28th Light Anti-aircraft Battery, while the 21st Battery was reorganized as 21st Surveillance, Target Acquisition and Tactical Liaison Battery. The regiment consisted now of the following units:

- 2nd Field Artillery Regiment "Vicenza", in Trento
  - Command and Services Battery
  - 21st Surveillance, Target Acquisition and Tactical Liaison Battery
  - 1st Group
    - 19th Battery, with FH-70 155mm howitzers
    - 20th Battery, with FH-70 155mm howitzers
    - 45th Fire and Technical Support Battery

The regiment was disbanded on 25 June 2015 and the flag of the 2nd Mountain Artillery Regiment was transferred to the shrine of the Flags in the Vittoriano in Rome.
