= 2nd Alpine Division "Tridentina" =

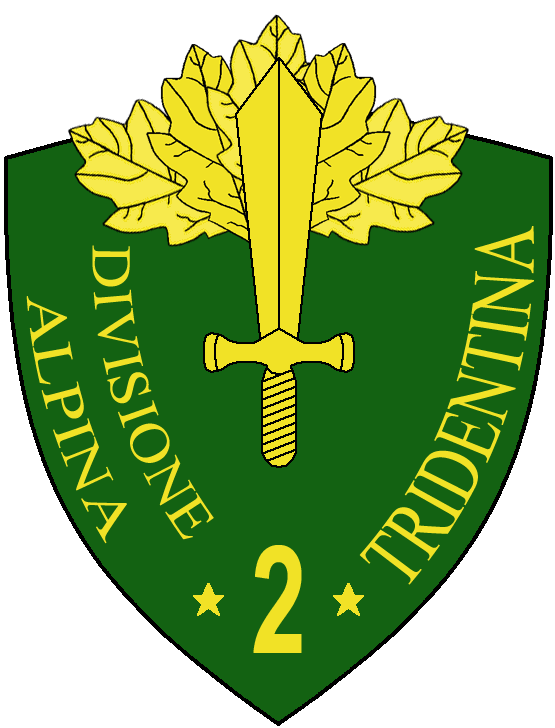
- 2nd Alpine Division "Tridentina" insignia
- Active: 10 September 1935 – 28 January 1943
- Country: Kingdom of Italy
- Branch: Royal Italian Army
- Type: Alpini
- Role: Mountain Infantry
- Size: 17,460 men
- Part of: Alpine Army Corps; 1942-1943
- Garrison/HQ: Meran
- Engagements: World War II; Italian participation in the Eastern Front

Commanders
- Notable commanders: General Luigi Reverberi

Insignia
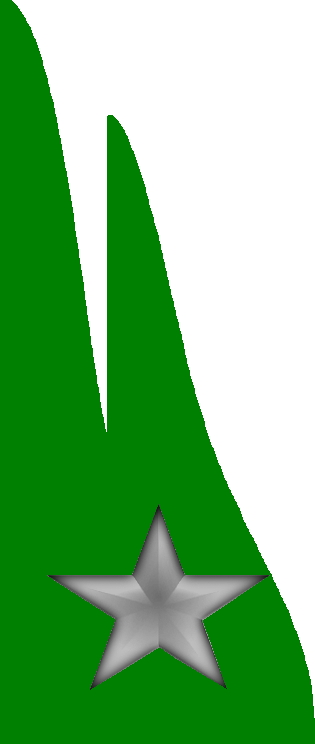
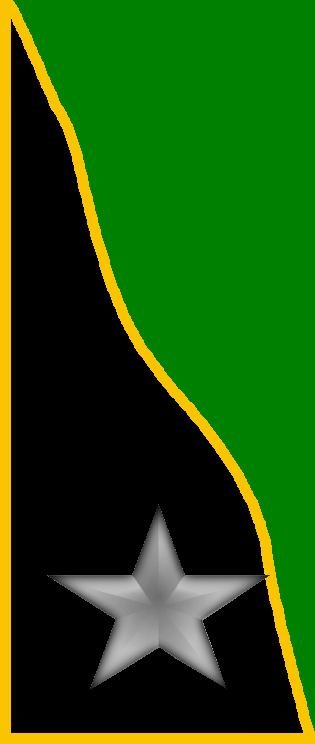
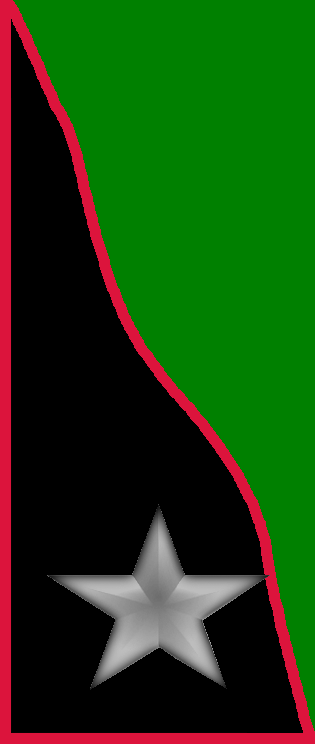
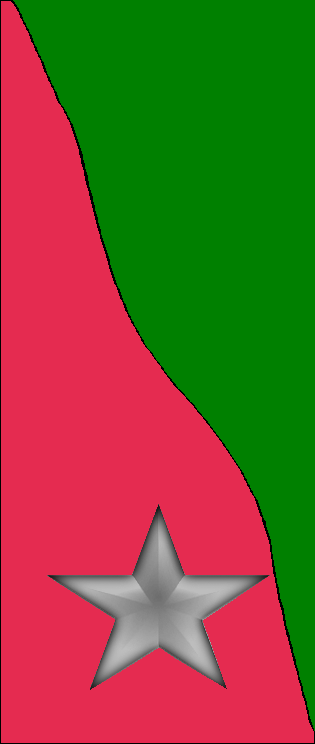
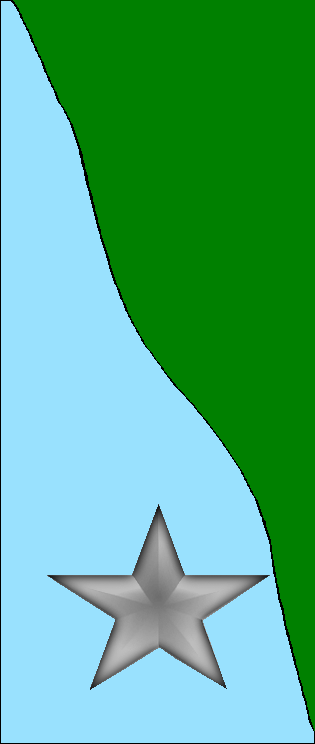
- Identification symbol: Tridentina Division gorget patches

The 2nd Alpine Division "Tridentina" (Italian: 2ª Divisione alpina "Tridentina") was a division of the Royal Italian Army during World War II, which specialized in mountain warfare. The Alpini that formed the divisions are a highly decorated and elite mountain corps of the Italian Army comprising both infantry and artillery units. The name Tridentina was chosen as the division was based in the Trentino-South Tyrol region, for which the fascist regime of Benito Mussolini had created the neologism Venezia Tridentina. After World War II, the traditions and name of the 2nd Alpine Division "Tridentina" were carried on by the Alpine Brigade "Tridentina".

== History ==
The division's lineage begins with the II Alpine Brigade formed on 11 March 1926 in Verona with the 5th Alpini Regiment in Milan, 6th Alpini Regiment in Brixen, and 7th Alpini Regiment in Belluno and the 2nd Mountain Artillery Regiment in Bergamo. On 27 October 1934 the brigade changed its name to II Superior Alpine Command, which received the name Tridentino in December of the same year (Italian: II Comando Superiore Alpino "Tridentino").

On 10 September 1935 the II Superior Alpine Command "Tridentino" was reformed as 2nd Alpine Division "Tridentina" with the 5th and 6th Alpini regiments and the 2nd Alpine Artillery Regiment, while the 7th Alpini Regiment was transferred to the 3rd Alpine Division "Julia". On 25 December 1935 the Tridentina temporarily transferred its Alpini Battalion "Trento" and one battery from its alpine artillery regiment to the 5th Alpine Division "Pusteria" for the Second Italo-Ethiopian War.

=== World War II ===
==== Invasion of France ====
The division participated in the Italian invasion of France in June 1940. On 21-23 June it participated in the attack on the Little St Bernard Pass.

==== Greco-Italian War ====
In November 1940 the division was transferred to Albania for the Greco-Italian War. By 23 November the division had entered the front in the upper Devoll valley, but by December it was in retreat during the Greek counter-offensive. During the Battle of Greece the division pursued the retreating Greek forces to Leskovik and Ersekë. After the war's conclusion the division returned to Italy.

==== Soviet Union ====
The Tridentina was one of the ten Italian divisions of the Italian Army in Russia, which fought on the Eastern Front. In July 1942 the division, together with the 3rd Alpine Division "Julia" and the 4th Alpine Division "Cuneense" formed the Alpine Army Corps, which was transferred to Eastern Ukraine. From there the Tridentina marched to Millerovo and then onward to the Don river, where it took up positions near Podgornoye by October 1942.

On 12 December 1942 the Red Army's Operation Little Saturn commenced, which in its first stage attacked and encircled the Italian Army in Russia's II Army Corps and XXXV Army Corps. On 13 January 1943, the Red Army launched the second stage of Operation Little Saturn: four armies of General Filipp Golikov's Voronezh Front attacked, encircled, and destroyed the Hungarian Second Army near Svoboda on the Don to the northwest of the Alpine Army Corps and pushed back the remaining units of the German XXIV Army Corps on the Alpine Army Corps' left flank, thus encircling the Alpine Army Corps.

On the evening of 17 January, the Alpine Army Corps commander, General Gabriele Nasci, ordered a full retreat. At this point only the Tridentina division was still capable of conducting effective combat operations. The 40,000-strong mass of stragglers — Alpini and Italians from other commands, plus German and Hungarian Hussars — formed two columns that followed the Tridentina division which, supported by a handful of German armored vehicles, led the way westwards to the Axis lines.

On the morning of 26 January, the spearheads of the Tridentina reached the hamlet of Nikolayevka, occupied by the 48th Guards Rifle Division. The Soviets had fortified the railway embankment on both sides of the village. General Nasci ordered a frontal assault and at 9:30 am the Battle of Nikolayevka began with the 6th Alpini Regiment with the battalions "Verona", "Val Chiese", and "Vestone", the Tridentina division's II Mixed Alpine Engineer Battalion, the Alpine Artillery Group "Bergamo" of the 2nd Alpine Artillery Regiment, and three German Sturmgeschütz III leading the attack. By noon the Italian forces had reached the outskirts of the village and the Alpine Army Corps' Chief of Staff General Giulio Martinat brought up reinforcements: the 5th Alpini Regiment with the battalions "Edolo", "Morbegno" and "Tirano", and the remaining alpine artillery groups "Vicenza" and "Val Camonica" of the 2nd Alpine Artillery Regiment, as well as the remnants of the Alpini Battalion "L’Aquila" of the "Julia" division. General Martinat fell during this assault.

By sunset the Alpini battalions were still struggling to break the reinforced Soviet lines and in a last effort to decide the battle before nightfall General Luigi Reverberi, commander of the Tridentina, ordered the remaining troops and stragglers, which had arrived over the course of the afternoon, to assault the Soviet positions in a human wave attack. The assault managed to break open the Soviet lines and the Italian survivors managed to continue their retreat, which was no longer contested by Soviet forces. On 1 February 1943 the remnants of the Alpine Army Corps reached Axis lines. Only one third of the Tridentina had survived the battle on the Don and the retreat (approximately 4,250 survivors of 18,000 troops deployed).

==== Return to Italy ====
The remnants of the division were repatriated in April 1943 and the division was reformed on 1 May 1943 with the 102nd Marching Alpini Regiment of the 8th Marching Division. After the announcement of the Armistice of Cassibile on 8 September 1943 the invading German forces disbanded the division.

== Organization ==
2nd Alpine Division "Tridentina" organization during the campaign on the Eastern Front

When the division was deployed to the Soviet Union it consisted of the following units:

- 2nd Alpine Division "Tridentina", in Merano
  - Headquarters
    - Command Company
    - 402nd Carabinieri Section
    - 417th Carabinieri Section
    - 201st Field Post Office
    - 2nd Alpine Division Command Transport Squad
  - 5th Alpini Regiment, in Merano
    - Command Company
    - Alpini Battalion "Morbegno"
      - Command Company
      - 44th, 45th, and 47th Alpini companies
      - 107th Support Weapons Company (Breda M37 machine guns, 45mm mod. 35 and 81mm mod. 35 mortars)
    - Alpini Battalion "Tirano"
      - Command Company
      - 46th, 48th, and 49th Alpini companies
      - 109th Support Weapons Company (Breda M37 machine guns, 45mm mod. 35 and 81mm mod. 35 mortars)
    - Alpini Battalion "Edolo"
      - Command Company
      - 50th, 51st, and 52nd Alpini companies
      - 110th Support Weapons Company (Breda M37 machine guns, 45mm mod. 35 and 81mm mod. 35 mortars)
    - 82nd Cannons Company (47/32 mod. 35 anti-tank guns; formed by the regiment for the campaign in the Soviet Union)
    - 5th Supply Section
    - 25th Train Section (equipped with mules)
    - 5th Medical Section (includes the 618th Field Hospital)
  - 6th Alpini Regiment, in Sterzing
    - Command Company
    - Alpini Battalion "Vestone"
      - Command Company
      - 53rd, 54th, and 55th Alpini companies
      - 111th Support Weapons Company (Breda M37 machine guns, 45mm mod. 35 and 81mm mod. 35 mortars)
    - Alpini Battalion "Verona"
      - Command Company
      - 56th, 57th, and 58th Alpini companies
      - 113th Support Weapons Company (Breda M37 machine guns, 45mm mod. 35 and 81mm mod. 35 mortars)
    - Alpini Battalion "Val Chiese"
      - Command Company
      - 253rd, 254th, and 255th Alpini companies
      - 112th Support Weapons Company (Breda M37 machine guns, 45mm mod. 35 and 81mm mod. 35 mortars)
    - 216th Cannons Company (47/32 mod. 35 anti-tank guns; formed by the regiment for the campaign in the Soviet Union)
    - 6th Supply Section
    - 26th Train Section (equipped with mules)
    - 6th Medical Section (includes the 621st Field Hospital)
  - 2nd Alpine Artillery Regiment, in Merano
    - Command Unit
    - Alpine Artillery Group "Vicenza" (75/13 mod. 15 mountain guns)
      - 19th Battery
      - 20th Battery
      - 45th Battery
      - Ammunition and Supply Unit
    - Alpine Artillery Group "Bergamo" (75/13 mod. 15 mountain guns)
      - 31st Battery
      - 32nd Battery
      - 33rd Battery
      - Ammunition and Supply Unit
    - Alpine Artillery Group "Val Camonica" (assigned in April 1942 for the campaign in the Soviet Union; 105/11 mod. 28 mountain guns)
      - 28th Battery
      - 29th Battery
      - Ammunition and Supply Unit
    - 56th Anti-aircraft Battery (20/65 mod. 35 anti-aircraft guns; assigned for the campaign in the Soviet Union)
    - 59th Anti-aircraft Battery (20/65 mod. 35 anti-aircraft guns; assigned for the campaign in the Soviet Union)
    - 76th Anti-tank Battery (75/39 anti-tank guns; assigned for the campaign in the Soviet Union)
  - II Mixed Alpine Engineer Battalion
    - Command Platoon
    - 102nd Searchlight Section
    - 112th Telegraph and Radio Operators Company
    - 122nd Engineer Company
  - 5th Train Column (expanded to 5th Train Unit for the campaign in the Soviet Union; both units equipped with mules)
  - 110th Supply Section
  - 206th Mixed Transport Unit
    - 126th Mixed Transport Platoon
    - 721st Heavy Transport Platoon
    - 722nd Heavy Transport Platoon
    - 946th Heavy Transport Platoon
  - 302nd Medical Section
    - 619th Field Hospital
    - 620th Field Hospital
    - 622nd Field Hospital
    - 623rd Field Hospital

The division strength was 573 officers and 16,887 NCOs and soldiers for a total strength of 17,460 men. The division also had 176 horses, 4,698 mules and 584 transport vehicles at its disposal.

== Military honors ==
For their conduct during the Italian campaign in the Soviet Union the President of Italy awarded on 31 December 1947 to the three regiments of the 2nd Alpine Division "Tridentina" Italy's highest military honor, the Gold Medal of Military Valor. The 5th Alpini Regiment was also decorated for its conduct during the Greco-Italian War.

- 5th Alpini Regiment on 9 June 1948
- 5th Alpini Regiment on 31 December 1947
- 6th Alpini Regiment on 31 December 1947
- 2nd Alpine Artillery Regiment on 31 December 1947

== Commanding officers ==
The division's commanding officers were:

- Generale di Divisione Gabriele Nasci (31 October 1935 - 31 August 1938)
- Generale di Divisione Ugo Santovito (1 September 1938 - 1 April 1941)
- Generale di Brigata Luigi Reverberi (acting, 2-13 April 1941)
- Generale di Divisione Ugo Santovito (14 April 1941 - 2 August 1941)
- Generale di Divisione Luigi Reverberi (3 August 1941 - 8 September 1943)

== Today ==
In 2002 the Italian Army decided to raise three division commands, with one of the three always readily deployable for NATO missions. The army decided that each of the three should carry on the traditions of one of the divisions that served with distinction in World War II. Therefore, on 1 January 2003 the Division Command "Tridentina" was activated in Bolzano which carries on the traditions of the 2nd Alpine Division "Tridentina" and the Alpine Brigade "Tridentina".

== See also ==
- Italian Army in Russia
