= Ugo Santovito =

Italian general

- Born: 11 March 1882; Manfredonia, Kingdom of Italy
- Died: 22 January 1943 (aged 60); Meran, Kingdom of Italy
- Military career
- Allegiance: Kingdom of Italy
- Branch: Royal Italian Army
- Service years: 1899–1943
- Rank: Lieutenant general
- Commands: 2nd Mountain Artillery Regiment; 2nd Alpine Division Tridentina; XIX Army Corps; XXVI Army Corps; VI Army Corps
- Conflicts: Italo-Turkish War; World War I; Battle of Asiago; Battles of the Isonzo; Battle of Monte Grappa; Battle of Vittorio Veneto; Second Italo-Ethiopian War; World War II; Battle of the Western Alps; Greco-Italian War
- Awards: Silver Medal of Military Valor (three times); Bronze Medal of Military Valor (three times); War Cross for Military Valor

Ugo Santovito (Manfredonia, 11 March 1882 – Meran, 22 January 1943) was an Italian general during World War II.

== Biography ==
He entered the Military Academy of Modena on 30 October 1899, and graduated as second lieutenant of artillery on 2 August 1902. On 22 August 1904 was promoted to the rank of lieutenant and was assigned to the Coastal Artillery Brigade of Sardinia. In 1911–1912 he participated in the Italo-Turkish War, initially in the 9th Fortress Artillery Regiment and later in the 36th Field Artillery Regiment, earning a Silver Medal of Military Valor. He remained in Libya after the end of the war, countering local insurgency, and returned to Italy on November 17, 1913.

Following the outbreak of the First World War he fought on the Asiago plateau with the rank of captain, initially in the 2nd Mountain Artillery Regiment and then in the 1st Mountain Artillery Regiment, earning a Bronze Medal of Military Valor. His artillery group was later transferred to the Dolomites, in the Col di Lana and Val Vanoi sector, where he was awarded another bronze medal for military valor. In early 1917 his group was transferred to the Isonzo front and Santovito was promoted to major on January 4, 1917, later earning a War Cross for Military Valor. After Caporetto, his group was redeployed on Monte Grappa, where Santovito earned two silver medals for military valor.

After the end of the war, he attended the staff officer course at the Italian Army War School from 15 November 1920 to 27 August 1922, at the end of which he assigned to the Cavalry Division Command of Udine, where he remained until 30 April 1923. He was promoted to colonel on May 16, 1930, after which on 16 September 1930 he became commander of the 2nd Mountain Artillery Regiment until 23 April 1934, after which he was given command of the 2nd Artillery Regiment of the Alpine Brigade Tridentina, until 20 September 1934.

He then became Head of Office at the Artillery Command of the Milan Army Corps, and in May 1935 he was transferred to the command of the Naples Army Corps. He left for Eritrea on 7 January 1936, participating in the Second Italo-Ethiopian War as chief of staff of the IV Army Corps. He returned to Italy on November 19, 1936, and was promoted to brigadier general on January 1, 1937, being then assigned to the Army Corps of Naples as commander of the Artillery until May 25, when he was transferred to the Army Corps of Bolzano, where he held the same position. On 1 September 1938 he was given command of the 2nd Alpine Division Tridentina, and on 19 July 1939 he was promoted to major general.

After Italy's entry into the Second World War he commanded the Tridentina Division during the brief offensive against France (21-24 June 1940), earning a bronze medal of military valor. After the outbreak of the Greco-Italian War, Santovito led his division on the Albanian front from November 16, 1940, to April 23, 1941; he returned to Italy in the following July and was promoted to lieutenant general on the 5th of that month. He left the command of Tridentina to General Luigi Reverberi on 3 August 1941.

On 10 June 1942 he assumed command of the XIX Army Corps in Bolzano, leaving it on 4 September and assuming command of the VI Corps in Croatia from 23 September 1942 to 4 January 1943, after short period at the command of the XXVI Corps in Greece.

He died suddenly in the reserve territorial military hospital of Merano due to a severe form of sepsis on January 22, 1943, aged sixty.
