= Canon de 75 M(montagne) modele 1928 =

Cannon de 75M(montagne) modele 1928
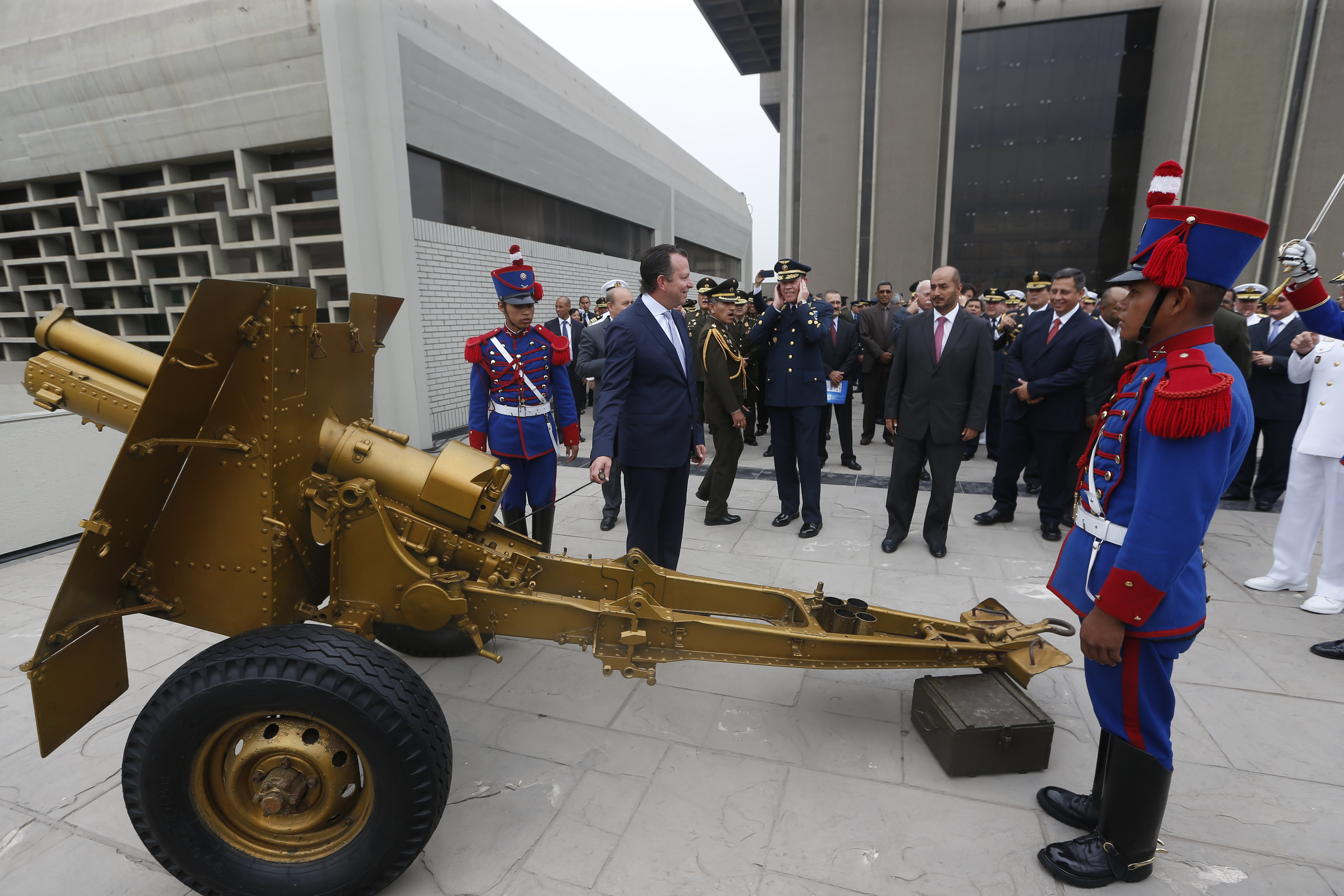
- A modernized modele 1928 used as a saluting gun in Peru.
- Type: mountain gun
- Place of origin: France

Service history
- Used by: France; Nazi Germany; Poland; North Vietnam
- Wars: Colombia–Peru War; World War II; First Indochina War

Production history
- Designer: Schneider
- Manufacturer: Schneider et Cie
- Produced: 1928

Specifications
- Mass: 660 kg (1,455 lbs)
- Barrel length: 1.39 m (4 ft 7 in) L/18.6
- Shell: 75 x 350 mmR; 7.25 kg (16 lbs)
- Caliber: 75 mm (2.95 in)
- Carriage: Box trail
- Elevation: -10° to +40°
- Traverse: 10°
- Muzzle velocity: 375 m/s (1,230 ft/s)
- Effective firing range: 9 km (5.5 mi)

The Canon de 75 Montagne modèle 1928 (75 mm M mle.28) was a French mountain gun, used by France, Poland and Nazi Germany during World War II.

== History ==
It is a derivative of the Canon de 75 M(montagne) modele 1919 Schneider, upgraded based on feedback from the Rif War. According to Peter Chamberlain, the design of the mle 1928 "owed little to that of the mle 1919" while the French Army manuals insisted on it being "slightly modified" (légèrement modifié). The mle 1928 featured a simpler shield.

The mle 1928 fired the same ammunitions than the Canon de 75 modèle 1897 and the mle. 1919. It could be carried on seven mules or towed by three mules.

The guns were also sold to Poland. After 1940, these weapons were used by the Germans as 7.5 cm GebK 283(f). The French used this weapon to equip the artillery batteries of the 4th Moroccan Mountain Division during 1944 and 1945. Some were later sent to alpine units but the gun was considered obsolete by that date.

== See also ==
- List of mountain artillery

== Notes ==
- Bresse (1936). "Matériel de 75 M. Mle 1919 ou 1928". École d'application d'artillerie. Organisation des matériels (in French). Vol. Tome V. Matériels usuels. Lithographie de l’École d'application d'artillerie. pp. 52–58.
