= Podgornoye, Podgorensky District, Voronezh Oblast =

Podgornoye Подгорное
- Sloboda
- Location within Voronezh Oblast Location within Russia
- Coordinates: 50°25′N 39°38′E
- Country: Russia
- Region: Voronezh Oblast
- District: Podgorensky District
- Time zone: UTC+3:00

Podgornoye (Russian: Подго́рное) is a rural locality (a sloboda) in Podgorenskoye Urban Settlement, Podgorensky District, Voronezh Oblast, Russia. The population was 3,483 (2021 census); 3,785 as of 2010. There are 33 streets.
