= Coni Zugna =

Mountain in Italy

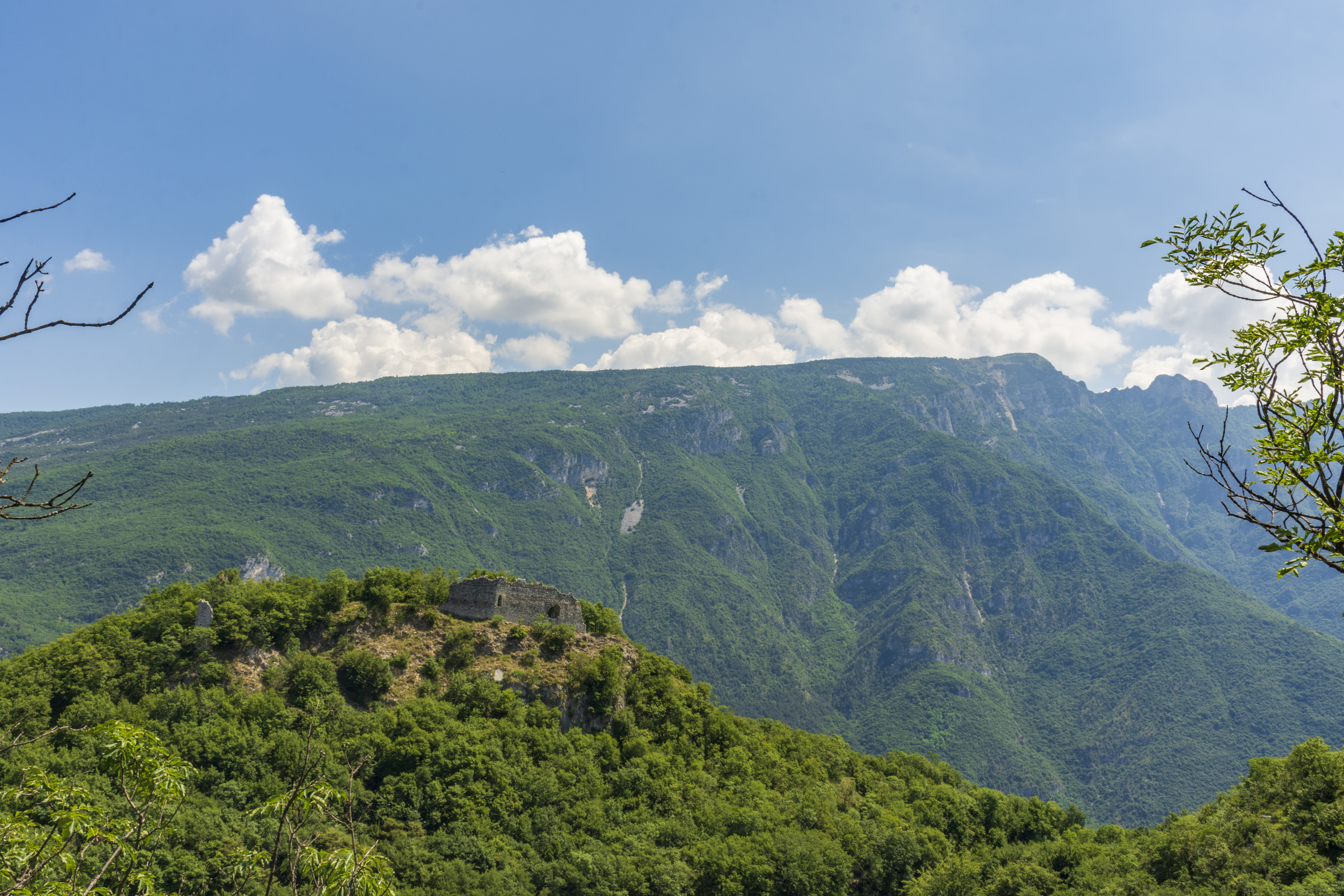
- Coni Zugna seen from Castel Sajori, near Ala

Highest point
- Elevation: 1,865 m (6,119 ft)
- Prominence: 404 m (1,325 ft)
- Coordinates: 45°47′58″N 11°04′08″E

Geography
- Location: Trentino, Italy
- Parent range: Vicentine Alps

Coni Zugna, also known as Monte Zugna, is a mountain in the Vicentine Alps, in northeastern Italy. It has an elevation of 1,865 metres and is located near the southern border of the province of Trento, close to the province of Vicenza, just north of the Gruppo della Carega. It is part of the mountain range that divides the Vallarsa from the Lagarina Valley.

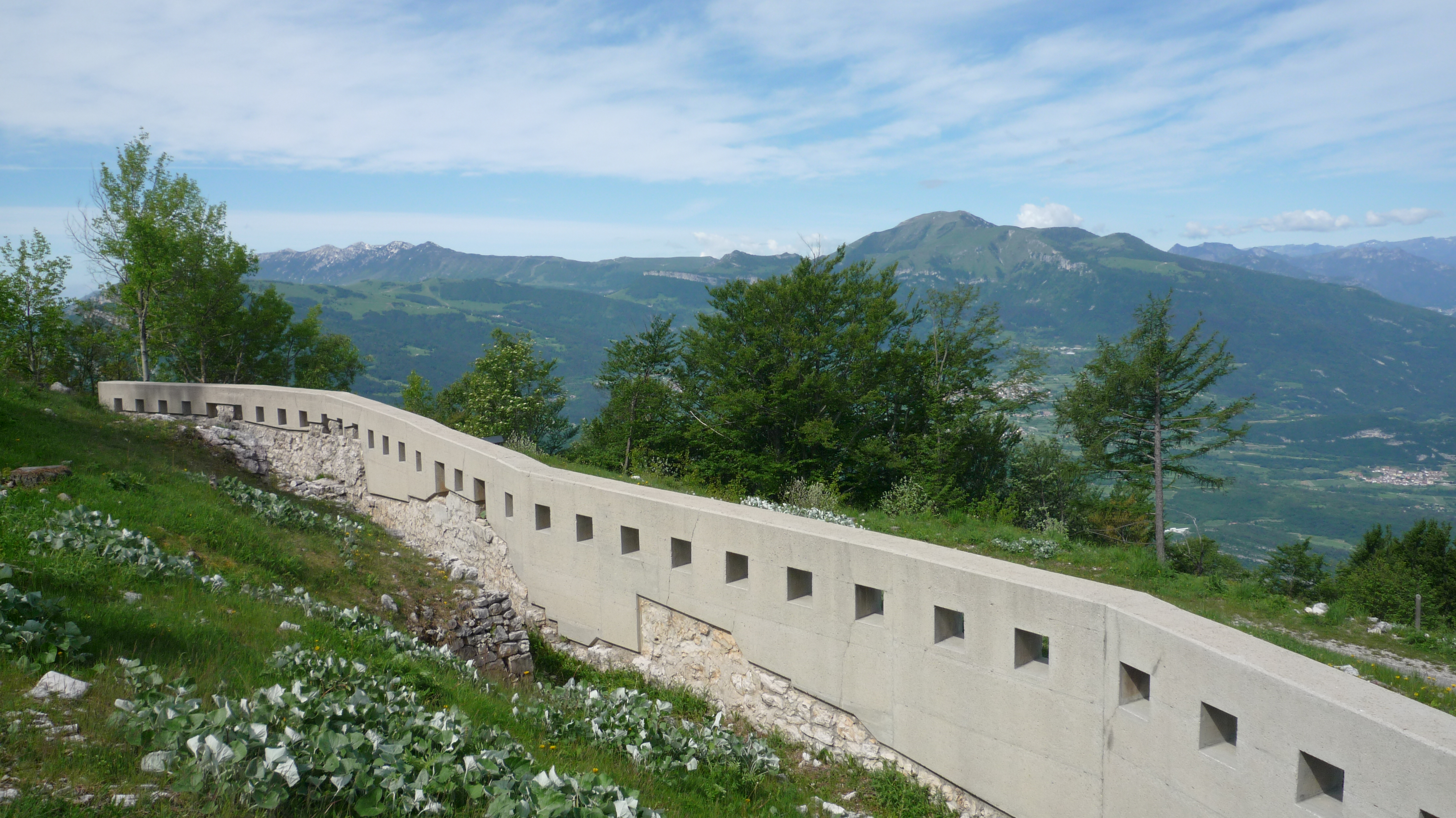
Fortified Italian trench in the Parco della Pace

Before the First World War the mountain was located in Austro-Hungarian territory, and the Austro-Hungarian authorities planned to build a fort on it, but work never started due to the outbreak of the war. During the war, the mountain was bitterly contested between Italy and Austria-Hungary, especially during the battle of Asiago in May and June 1916. Remains from the war are now part of the Parco della Pace (Peace Park), an open-air museum. In commemoration of the fighting during World War I, streets in many Italian cities bear the name of Coni Zugna, as does one of the stations of the Milan Metro Line 4.

An astronomical observatory, managed by the Civic Museum of Rovereto, is located on the mountain at a height of 1,620 meters. A mountain hut, also called Coni Zugna, is located at 1,610 meters.
