= Canon de 75 M(montagne) modele 1919 Schneider =

Cannon de 75M modele 1919 Schneider
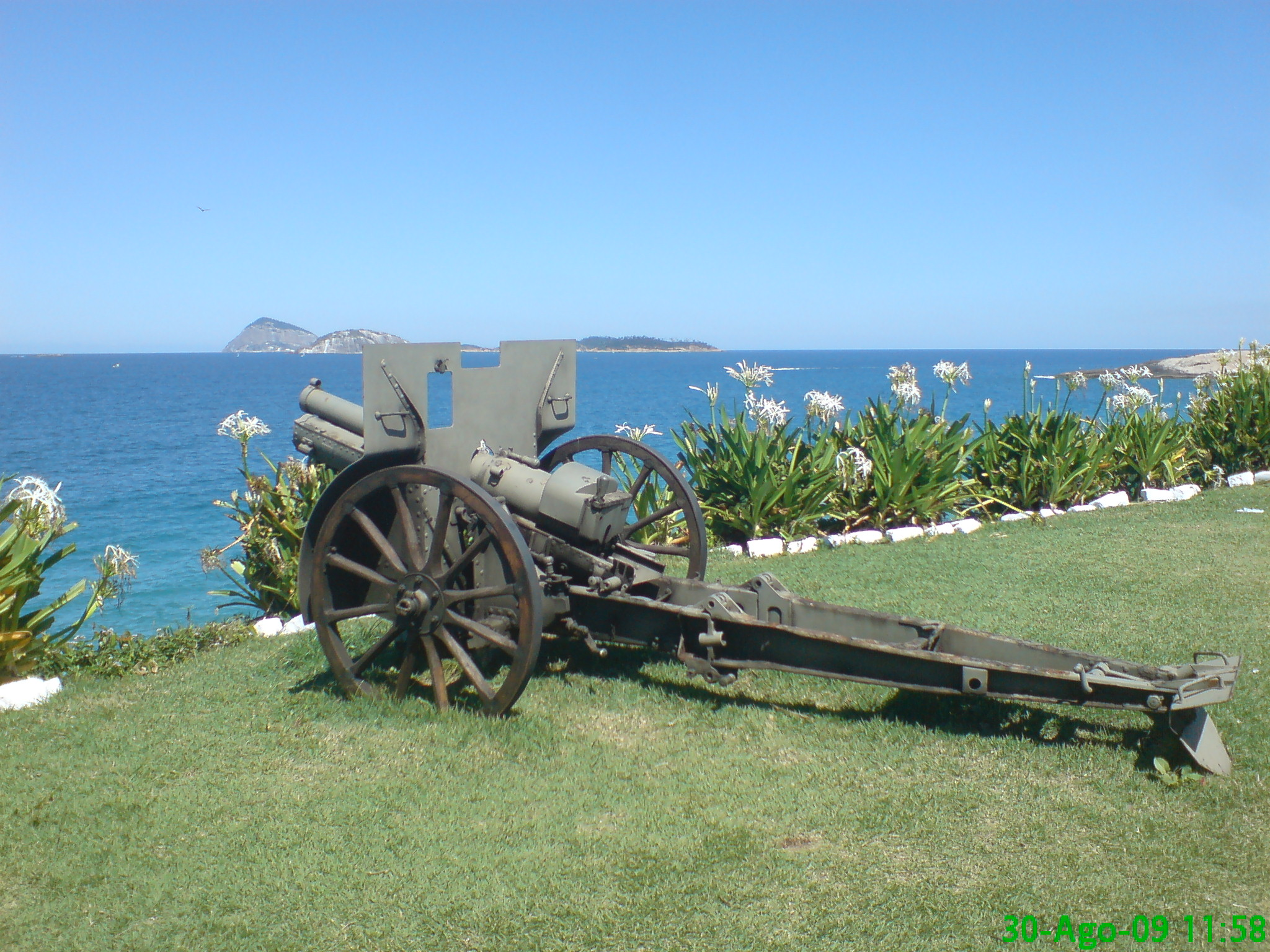
- A Brazilian Model 1919 gun on display at the Fort Copacabana Museum.
- Type: mountain gun
- Place of origin: France

Service history
- Used by: Brazil; Nazi Germany; Kingdom of Greece; Paraguay; Peru; Kingdom of Yugoslavia
- Wars: Chaco War; World War II

Production history
- Designer: Schneider
- Manufacturer: Schneider et Cie
- Produced: 1919

Specifications
- Mass: 721 kg (1,589 lbs) Travel; 660 kg (1,455 lbs) Combat
- Barrel length: 1.39 m (4 ft 7 in) L/18.6
- Shell: Fixed QF 75 x 350 mm R
- Shell weight: 6.33 kg (14 lbs)
- Caliber: 75 mm (2.95 in)
- Carriage: Box trail
- Elevation: -10° to +40°
- Traverse: 10°
- Muzzle velocity: 400 m/s (1,312 ft/s)
- Maximum firing range: 9,025 m (9,869 yds)

The Canon de 75 M (montagne) modèle 1919 Schneider (75 mm mle.1919) was a French mountain gun designed as a replacement of the 65 mm mle 1906. The mle 1919 was manufactured by Schneider et Cie and used during World War II. For transport, the gun could be broken down into seven sections. This weapon was used by Brazil, Paraguay, Yugoslavia and Greece. When captured by the Germans in World War II, the French guns were designated 7.5 cm GebK 237(f); the Yugoslav guns were designated 7.5 cm GebK 283(j). The gun crew was protected by an armoured shield.

== Greek service ==
This gun was used by the Greek Army in the Greek–Italian War from October 1940 to April 1941. It was used in divisional service in conjunction with the Schneider 105 mountain gun. Each Greek division had an artillery regiment with 16 mountain 75 mm and 8 mountain 105 mm guns. A total of 192 Mle 1919 75mm were procured by Greece, that equipped 12 (of 15) divisional artillery regiments.

== Survivors ==
- In 1923 the Brazilian Army ordered several Schneider Model 1919 75mm Mountain guns. At least 3 of them are now on display at the Fort Copacabana Museum in Rio de Janeiro, and 4 more still in use by the Brazilian Army as ceremonial guns in Curitiba, Paraná, Brazil.
- Several of the original 24 purchased are still used as gate guardians or exposed at Paraguayan museums, as they served during Chaco War.
- At least one example is exhibited in Hellenic War Museum in Athens, Greece.
- A gun from Nexter collection in St. Chamond is now exhibited in the Musée des Blindés in Saumur.
- A World War I monument near Coligny Caserne in Orléans features this artillery piece.
- Mle 1919/28 is exhibited in the Amis du Musée de l'Artillerie in Draguignan.

== Photo Gallery ==
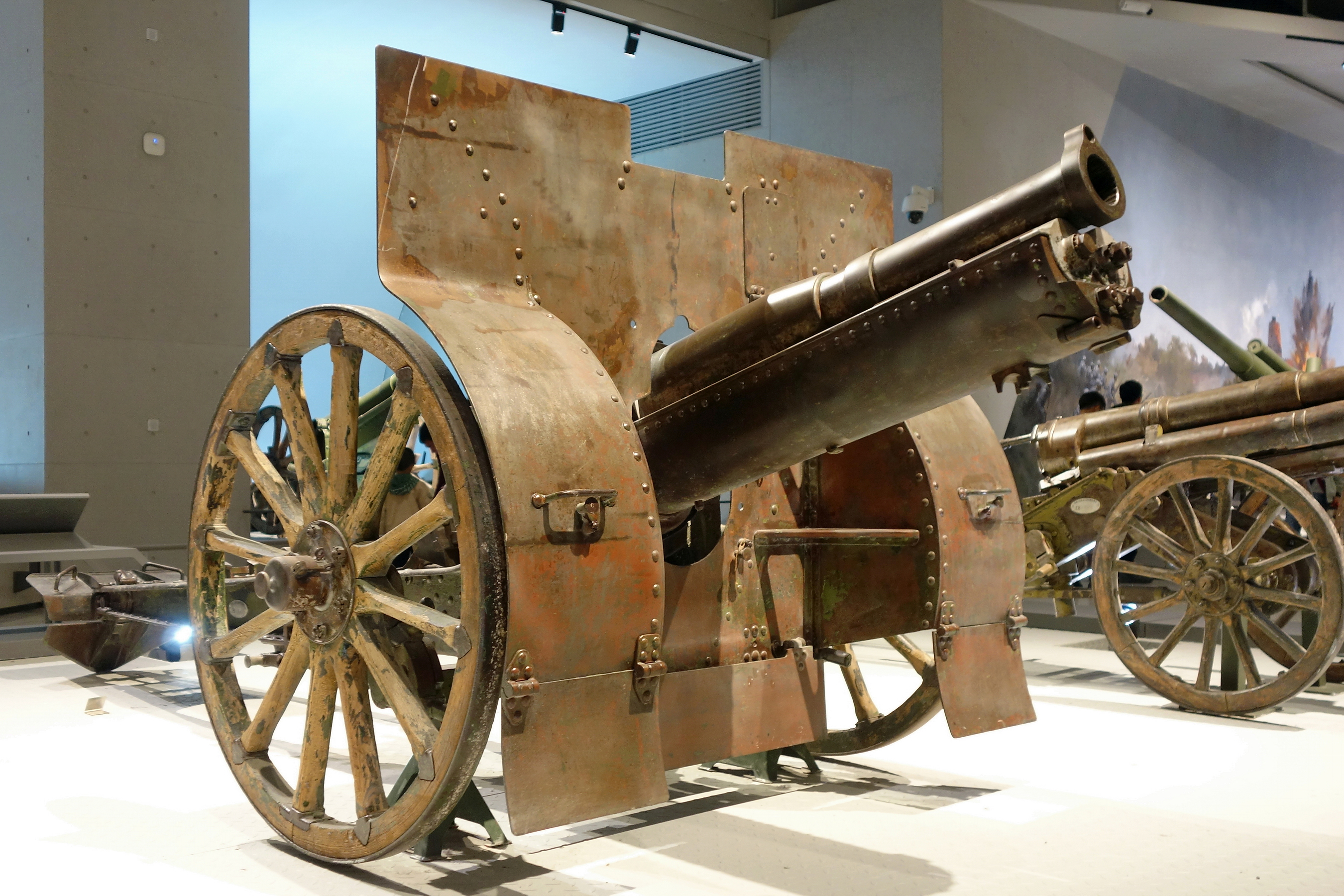
Schneider 75mm Mountain Gun M1919 at the Military Museum of the Chinese People's Revolution

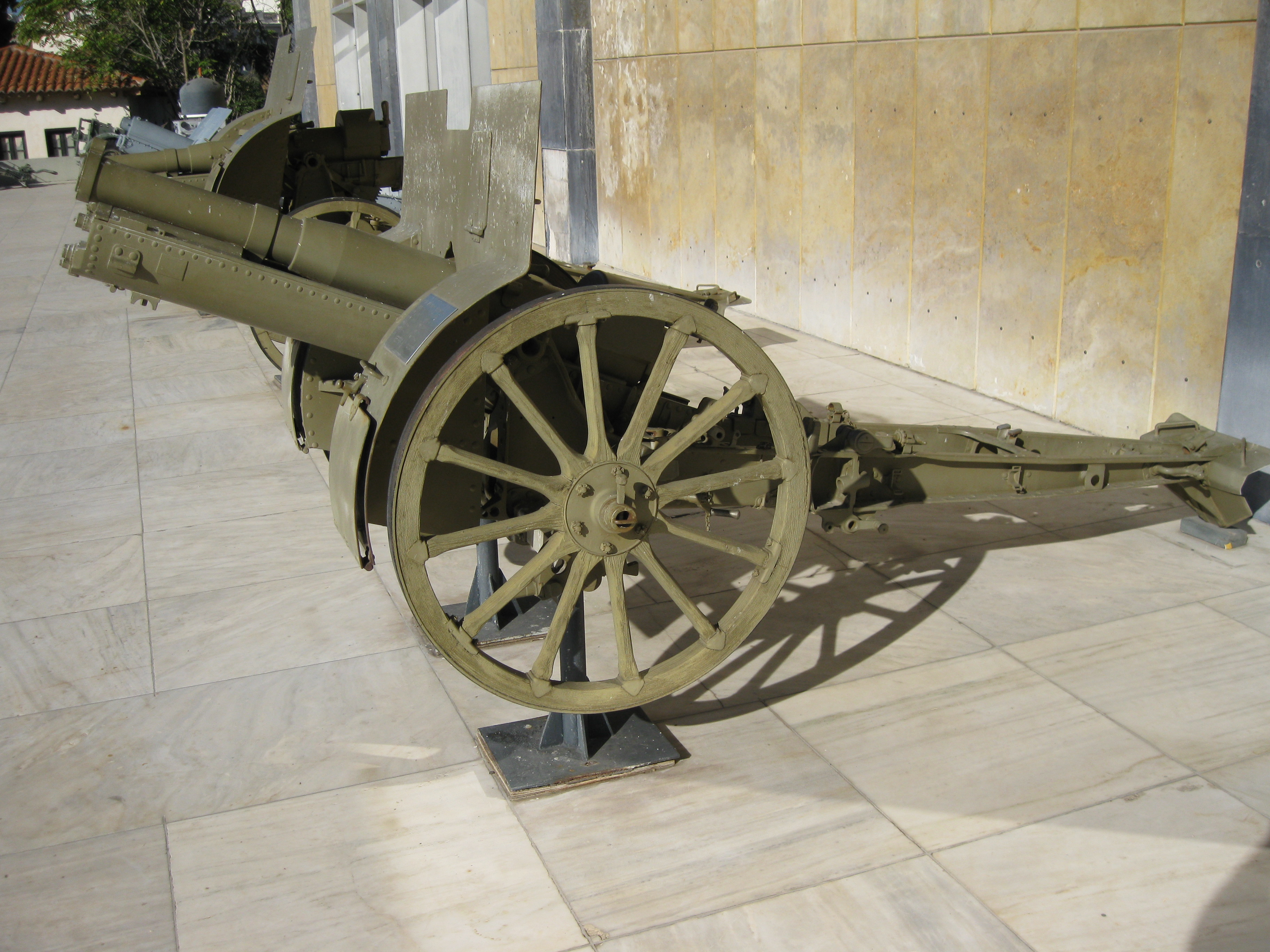
Schneider 75mm Mountain Gun at the Athens War Museum, Greece

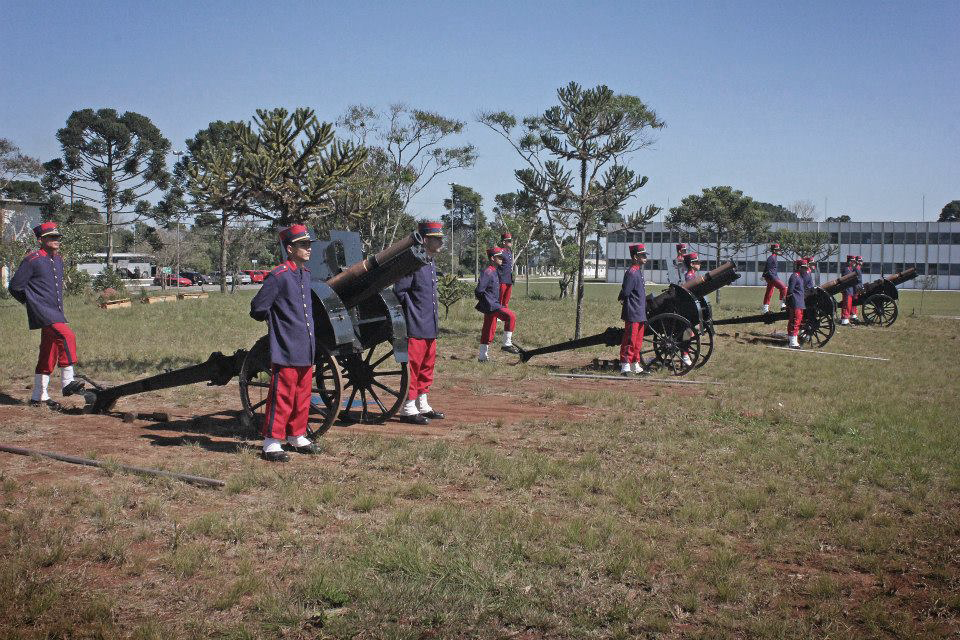
Ceremonial battery of the Brazilian Army composed by four Schneider canons during a gun salute

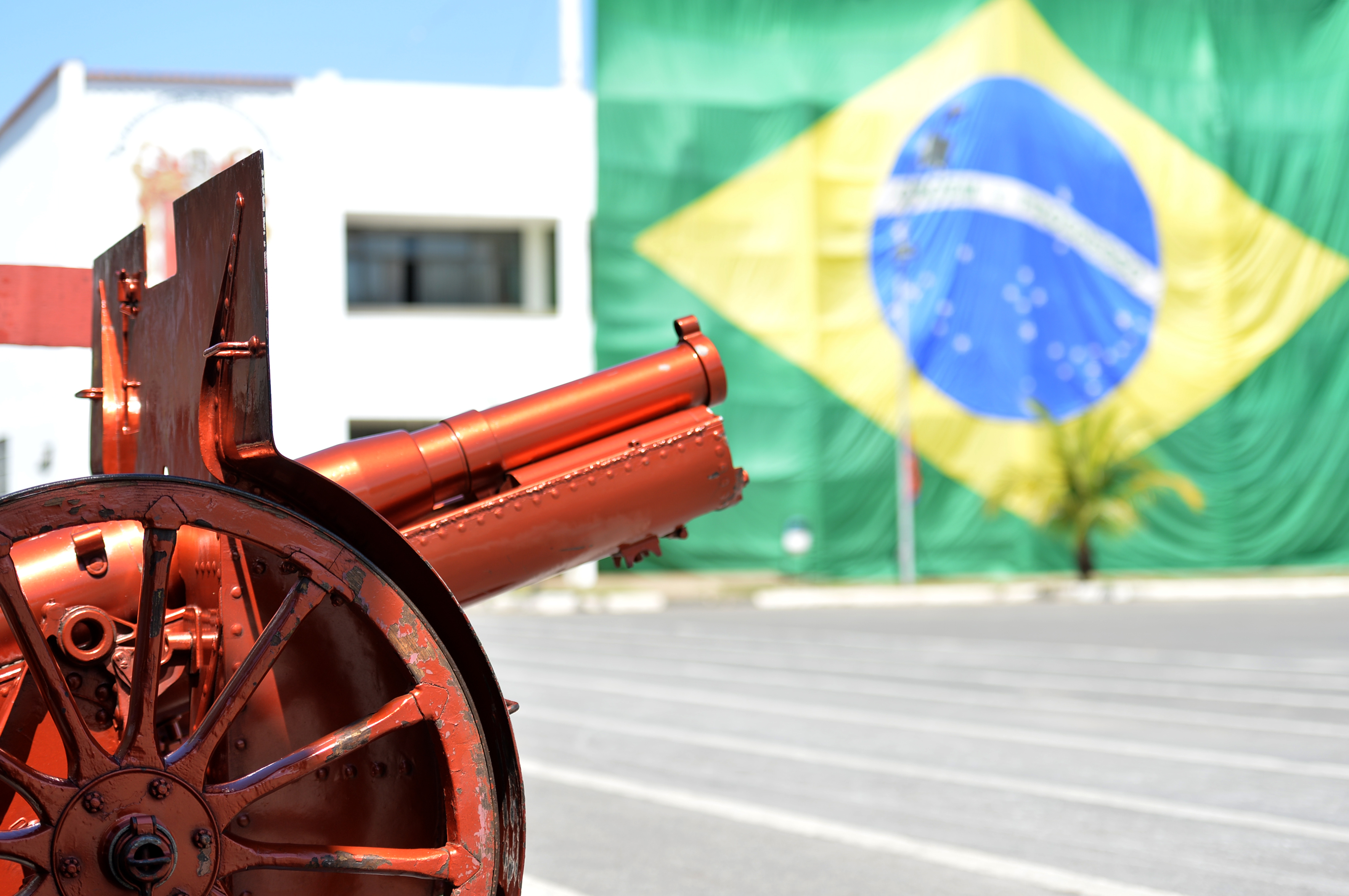
A Brazilian ceremonial cannon

== See also ==
Media related to Canon de 75 M(montagne) modèle 1919 Schneider at Wikimedia Commons

- 75 mm Schneider-Danglis 06/09
- List of mountain artillery
