= Luigi Reverberi =

Italian general

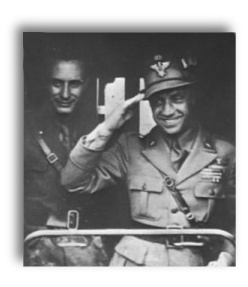
- General Reveberi leaving for the Eastern Front in 1942 with military chaplain Carlo Gnocchi
- Born: 12 September 1892; Cavriago, Kingdom of Italy
- Died: 22 June 1954 (aged 61); Milan, Italy
- Military career
- Allegiance: Kingdom of Italy
- Branch: Royal Italian Army
- Service years: 1913–1946
- Rank: Lieutenant General
- Commands: 67th Infantry Regiment; 2nd Alpine Division "Tridentina"
- Conflicts: World War I; White War; Battles of the Isonzo; Battle of Monte Grappa; Battle of Vittorio Veneto; World War II; Greco-Italian War; Battle of Nikolayevka
- Awards: Gold Medal of Military Valour; Silver Medal of Military Valour (three times); War Cross for Military Valor (twice); Military Order of Savoy; Colonial Order of the Star of Italy; Medal for Bravery (Serbia)

Luigi Reverberi (Cavriago, 12 September 1892 – Milan, 22 June 1954) was an Italian general during World War II.

== Biography ==
Reverberi attended the Military Academy of Modena and graduated as second lieutenant; with this rank he fought in Libya in 1913. During the First World War he fought with the 7th Alpini Regiment on the Tofane, the Banjšice Plateau, Škabrijel, Monte Solarolo, and on the mountains near Fiera di Primiero, and was awarded three Silver Medals for Military Valor, two War Crosses for Military Valor and the Military Order of Savoy.

After the war he served in the II Alpine Brigade and in 1926 he became lieutenant colonel; in 1935 he was promoted to colonel and given command of the 67th Infantry Regiment. In 1939 he was Chief of Staff of the Truckborne Army Corps (Corpo d'Armata Autotrasportabile), and in July of the same year he was promoted to brigadier general. In 1941 he was assigned to the command of the XXVI Army Corps in Albania.

In 1942 he was given command of the 2nd Alpine Division "Tridentina" and sent to the Eastern Front, deployed on the Don river. Following the Soviet success in Operation Little Saturn, in January 1943 the Alpine Corps of which the "Tridentina" was part was forced to retreat through the steppe in order to avoid being encircled and destroyed. Reverberi led his men during the battle of Nikolayevka, in which they managed to break out of the Soviet encirclement and reach Axis lines; one-third of the "Tridentina" was thus saved, along with the remnants of other units that had joined it, altogether some 18,000 men. Other columns, including the majority of the 3rd Alpine Division "Julia" and 4th Alpine Division "Cuneense", were unable to break out and were annihilated. For his behaviour at Nikolayevka, Reverberi was awarded the Gold Medal of Military Valour.

After his return to Italy, Reverberi was captured by German troops in Brixen on 8 September 1943, following the Armistice of Cassibile, and interned in a POW camp in Posen. By declaring that he wanted to join the Italian Social Republic, he obtained to be released and sent to Vittel, France, for training; once there, however, he soon made contact with the French Resistance. When the Germans found out, he was sent to a punishment camp in Wietzendorf and then back to Posen, where he was briefly held by the Soviets following the arrival of the Red Army.

In September 1945 he was finally allowed to return to Italy, and in 1947 he was promoted to lieutenant general. In 1946 he was denounced by Communist senator Edoardo D'Onofrio for collaboration with the Fascist regime and forced to retire.

After leaving the Army, Reverberi became managing director of a soap and cosmetics company, and a leading figure of the National Alpini Association. He was the author of several memoirs on the Italian campaign in Russia.

He died on 22 June 1954, following a heart attack, in his home in Milan, and was buried in his family tomb in Montecchio Emilia.
