= Canon Court de 105 M(montagne) modèle 1919 Schneider =

Canon Court de 105M (montagne) modèle 1919 Schneider
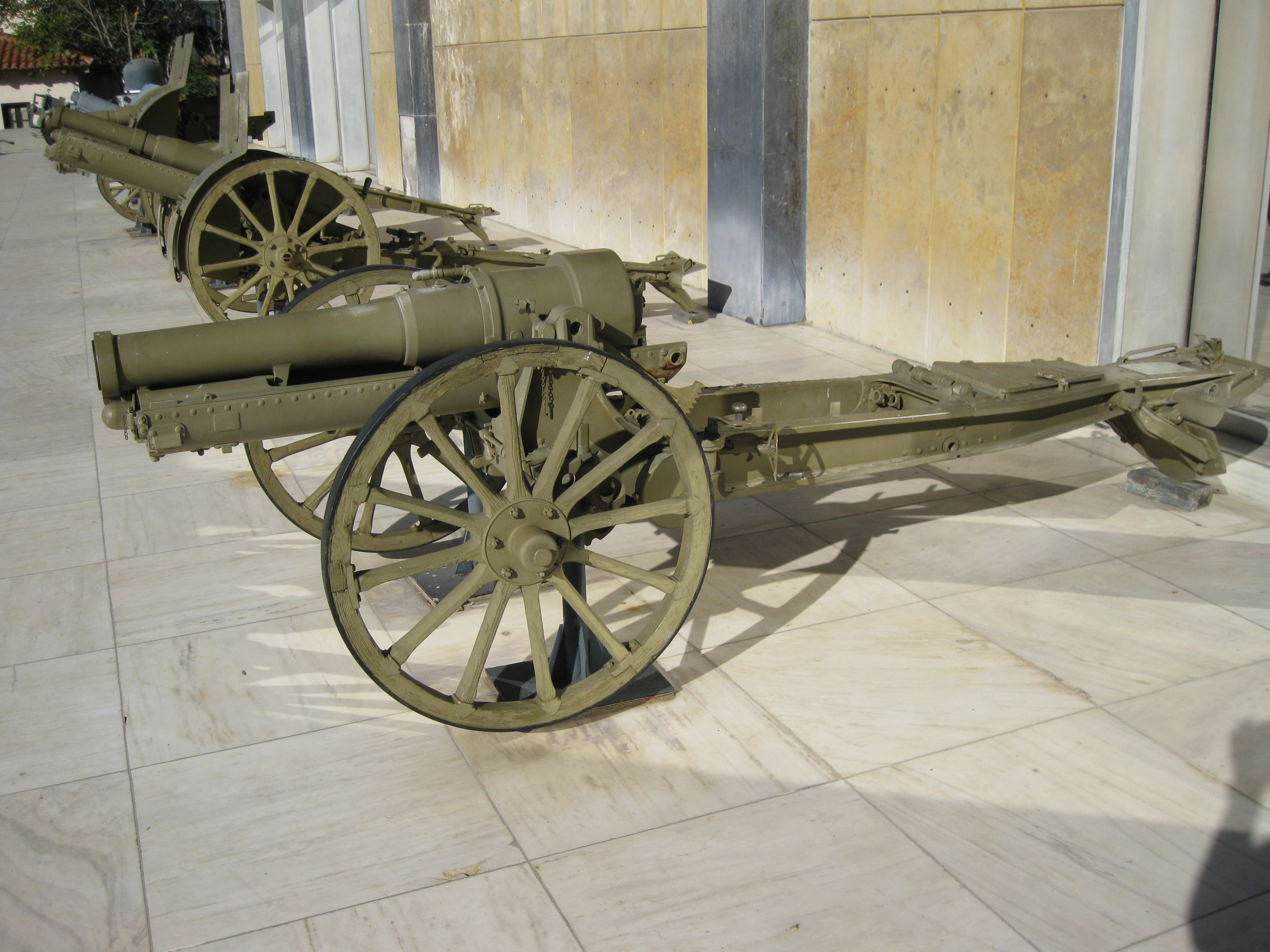
- Schneider 105, 1919/24 mountain gun at the Athens War Museum, Greece
- Type: Mountain gun
- Place of origin: France

Service history
- Used by: See users
- Wars: 2nd Sino-Japanese War; Spanish Civil War; World War II

Production history
- Manufacturer: Schneider et Cie
- Produced: 1919
- Variants: Canon Court de 105 M modèle 1928 Schneider; Obús Schneider 105/11 Modelo 1919; Type 99 10 cm Mountain Gun

Specifications
- Mass: 750 kg (1,653 lb)
- Length: 1.3 m (4 ft 3 in) L/12.4
- Barrel length: 98 cm (3 ft 3 in)
- Shell: 105 mm × 390 mm (4.13 in × 15.35 in) R
- Shell weight: 12 kg (26 lb 7 oz)
- Caliber: 105 mm (4.1 in)
- Breech: Interrupted screw
- Recoil: Hydro-pneumatic
- Carriage: Box trail
- Elevation: 0° to 40°
- Traverse: 9°
- Muzzle velocity: 350 m/s (1,148 ft/s)
- Maximum firing range: 7,850 m (8,585 yd)

The Canon Court de 105 M(montagne) modèle 1919 Schneider (105 mm mle.19) was a French mountain gun produced by Schneider and intended to be used in conjunction with the 75 mm mle.19 that was used by a number of countries during World War II.

== Design ==
The modèle 1919 was built from steel and had two spoked wheels, interrupted screw breech, hydro-pneumatic recoil system, box trail carriage and a rounded gun shield to protect the crew. For transport, this gun could be broken down into 8 sections, the barrel could be dismantled into 2 sections. A latter variant called the Canon Court de 105 M(montagne) modèle 1928 Schneider was produced in 1928. The modèle 1928 can be identified by its squared off gun shield and may have had a sprung axle and pneumatic tires for motor traction.

== Users ==
- Republic of China
- France
- Nazi Germany - Captured French guns were given the designations 10.5 cm le.GebH 322(f) for modèle 1919 guns and 10.5 cm le.GebH 323(f) for modèle 1928 guns in German service.
- Greece
- Kingdom of Italy
- Empire of Japan - Japan produced a copy of captured Chinese modèle 1928 guns designated the Type 99 10 cm mountain gun. Performance and dimensions of the Japanese gun were very similar.
- Spain - Licensed production began in 1924 at Trubia and was designated Obús Schneider 105/11 Modelo 1919.
- Kingdom of Yugoslavia - Captured Yugoslav guns were given the designation 10.5 cm le.GebH 329(j) in German service.

== Gallery ==
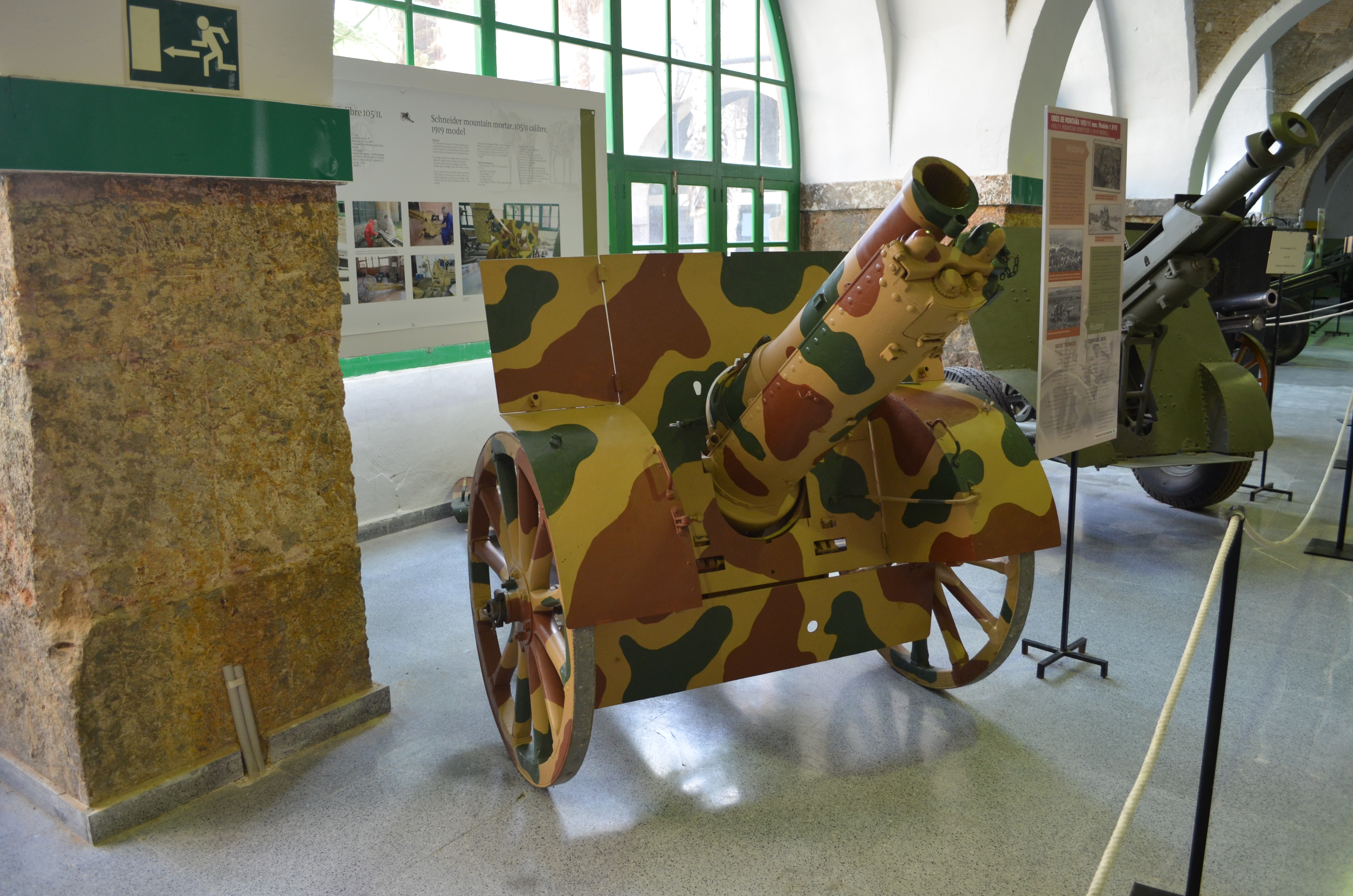
A Spanish Obús Schneider 105/11 Modelo 1919.

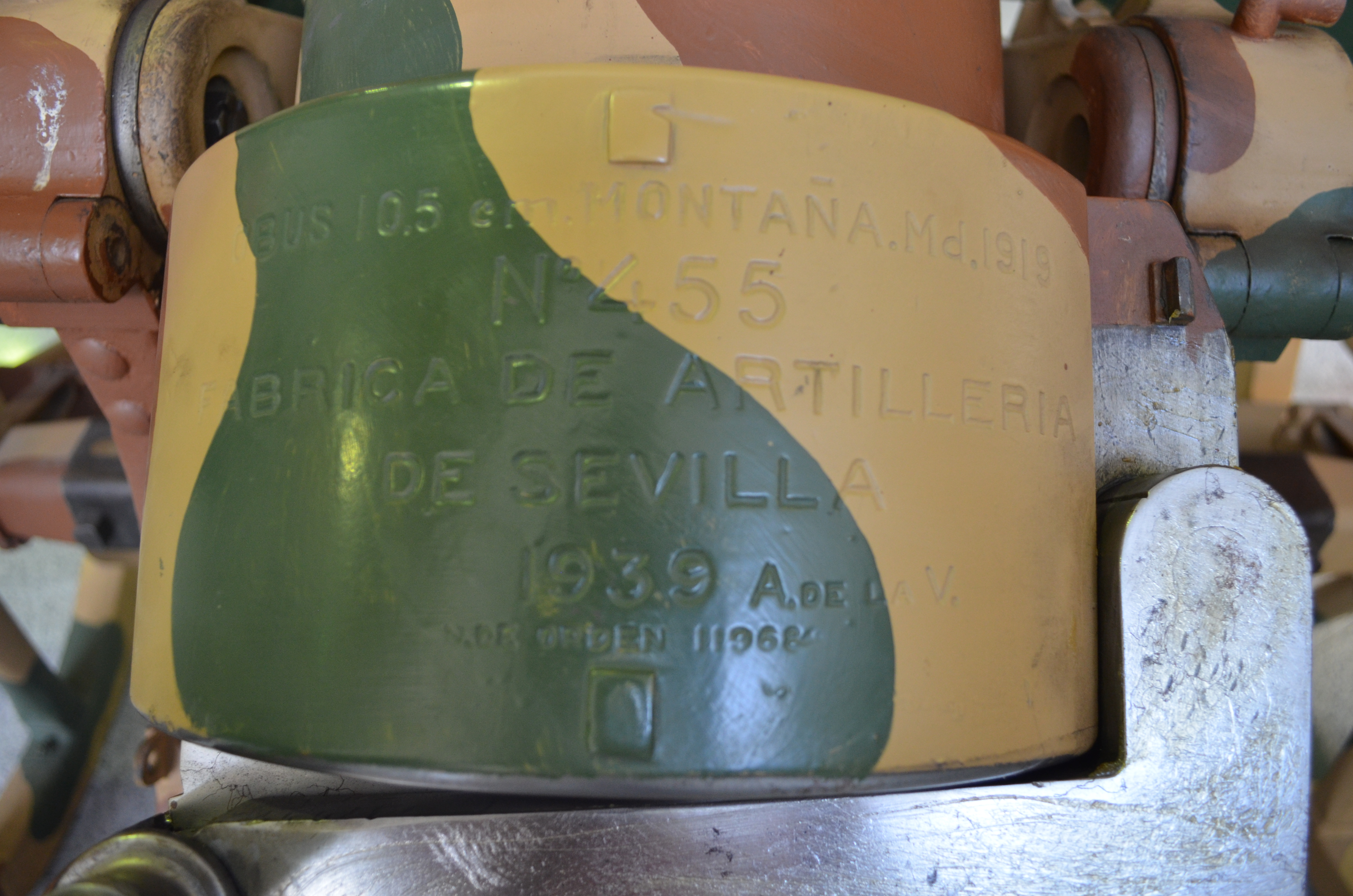
The Spanish guns manufacturers mark.

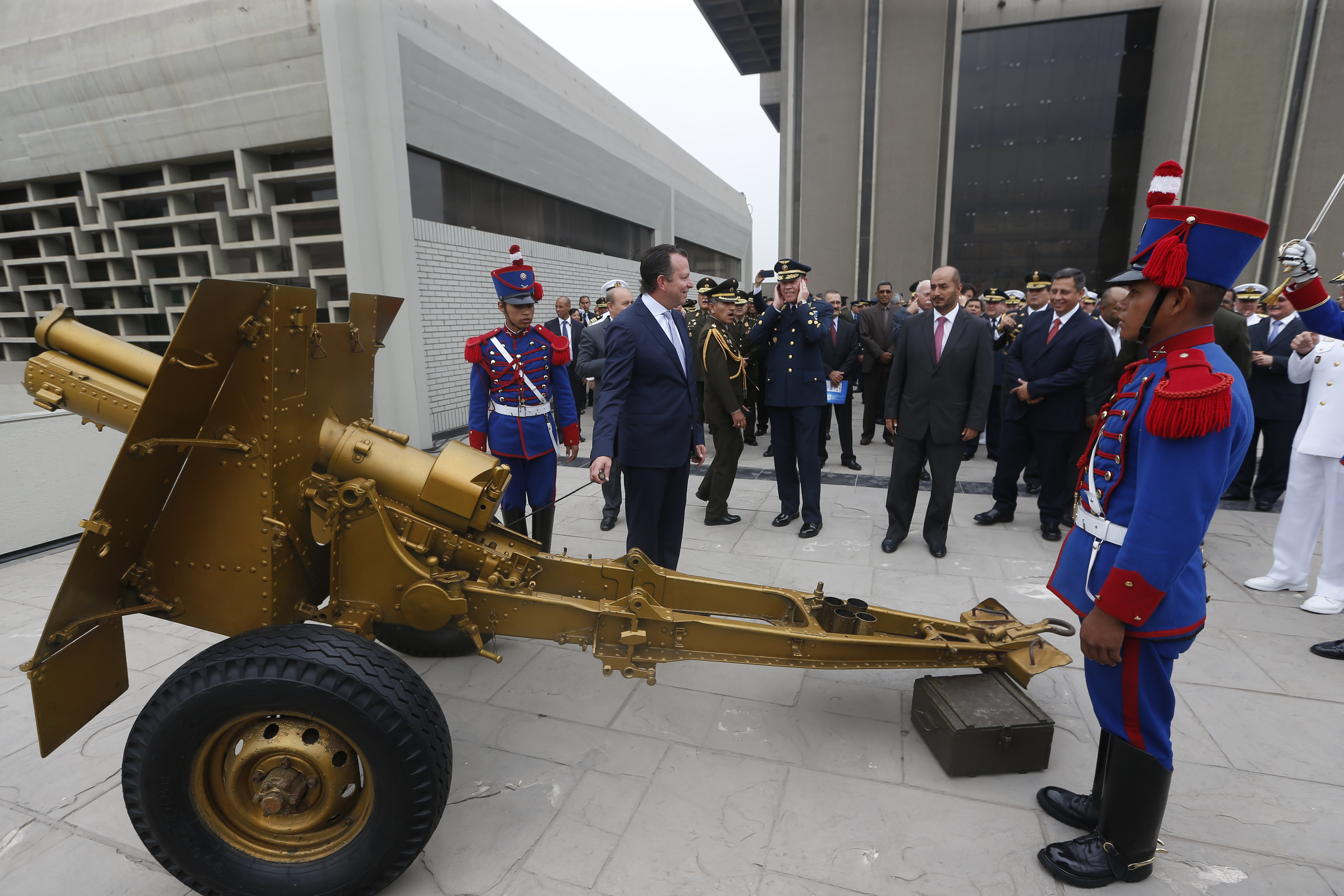
A Peruvian Canon de 75 M modèle 1928 with squared off shield as used on the Canon Court de 105 M modèle 1928.

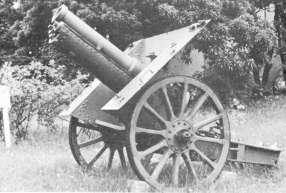
A Japanese Type 99 10 cm mountain gun displaying its similarity to the Canon Court de 105 M modèle 1928.
