= Ferrante Gonzaga (disambiguation) =

Ferrante Gonzaga (1507–1557) was an Italian condottiero and Count of Guastalla.

Ferrante Gonzaga may also refer to:

- Ferrante Gonzaga, Marquess of Castiglione (1544–1586), Italian nobleman and condottiero
- Ferrante II Gonzaga (1563–1630), Italian nobleman, Duke of Guastalla, grandson of the condottiero
- Ferrante III Gonzaga (1618–1678), Italian nobleman, Duke of Guastalla, grandson of the above
- Antonio Ferrante Gonzaga (1687–1729), Italian nobleman, Duke of Guastalla, great-grandson of Ferrante II
- Maurizio Ferrante Gonzaga (1861–1938), Italian general
- Ferrante Vincenzo Gonzaga (1889–1943), Italian general, son of the above
