= XIX Army Corps (Italy) =

The XIX Army Corps (Italian: XIX Corpo d'Armata) was a corps of the Royal Italian Army between 1942 and 1943.

== History ==
The XIX Army Corps was created on 3 March 1942 in Bolzano. On 1 May 1943 it was transferred to Campania where it was tasked with coastal defense.
When the Armistice of Cassibile was signed, the Corps commander Riccardo Pentimalli took no action to prevent the German takeover of the area under his control, and even fled in civilian clothes together with Ettore Deltetto, leaving his subordinates without orders. As a consequence, the XIX Corps was disarmed by the Germans and dissolved on 11 September 1943 at Santa Maria Capua Vetere.

== Composition (1943) ==
- 9th Infantry Division "Pasubio" (Carlo Biglino)
- 222nd Coastal Division (Ferrante Vincenzo Gonzaga - KIA)
- XXXII Coastal Brigade (Carlo Fantoni).
- Territorial Defense of Naples (Ettore Deltetto)

== Commanders ==
- Gen. D. Arturo Taranto (interim) (1942.03.03 – 1942.03.08)
- Gen. C.A. Gastone Gambara (1942.03.08 – 1942.06.10)
- Gen. C.A. Ugo Santovito (1942.06.10 – 1942.09.05)
- Gen. C.A. Benvenuto Gioda (1942.09.05 – 1943.02.25)
- Gen. C.A. Arturo Taranto (1943.02.25 - 1943.03.15)
- Gen. C.A. Enea Navarini (1943.03.15 – 1943.08.15)
- Gen. C.A. Riccardo Pentimalli (1943.08.15 – 1943.09.11)
