= 32nd Infantry Division "Marche" =

Infantry division of the Italian Army during World War II

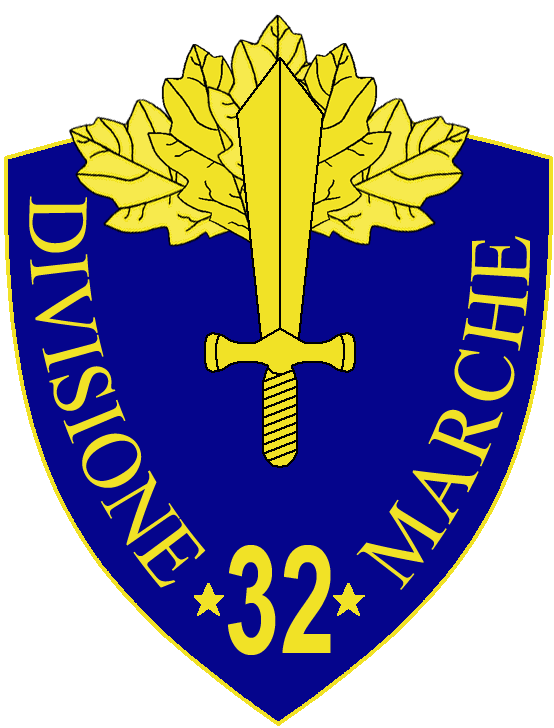
- 32nd Infantry Division "Marche" insignia
- Active: 1939–1943
- Country: Kingdom of Italy
- Branch: Royal Italian Army
- Type: Infantry
- Size: Division
- Garrison/HQ: Mestre
- Engagements: World War II

Commanders
- Notable commanders: General Riccardo Pentimalli; General Giuseppe Amico

Insignia
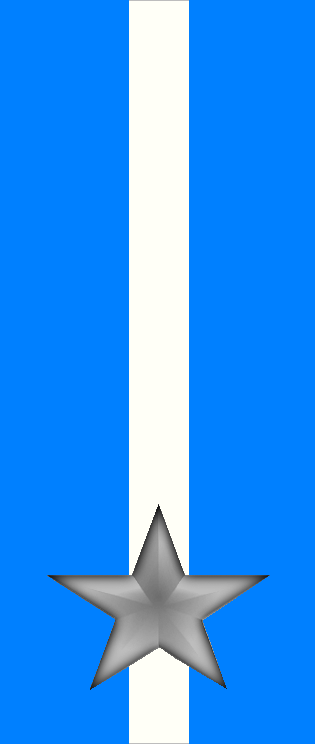
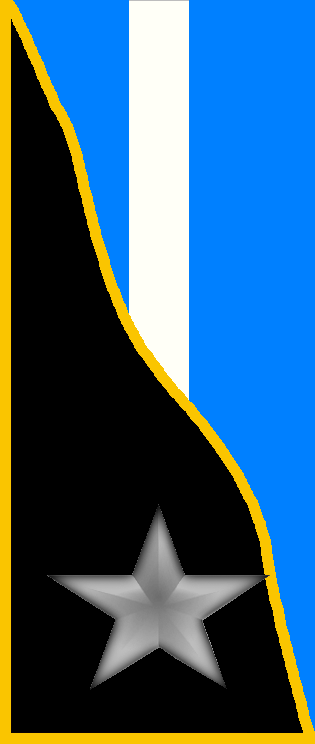
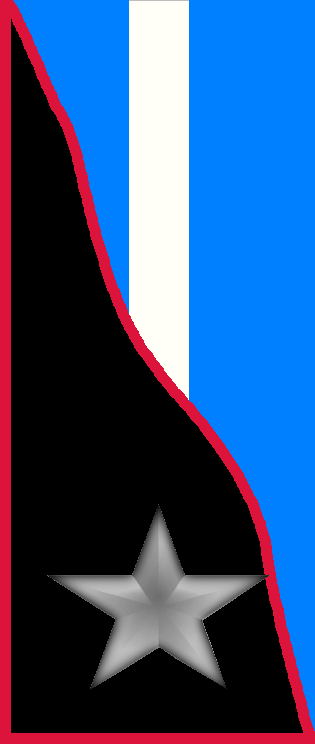
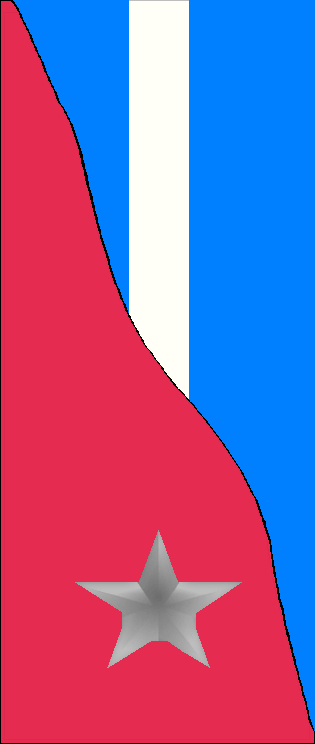
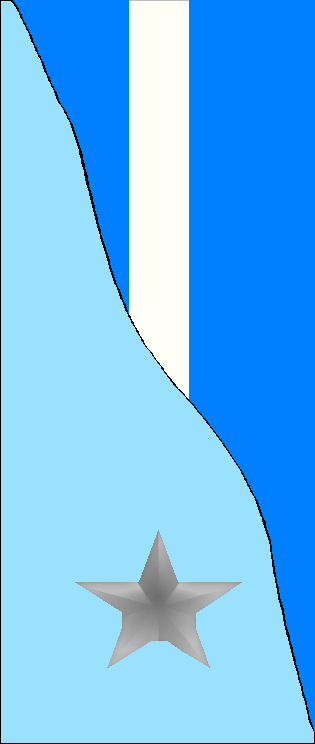
- Identification symbol: Marche Division gorget patches

The 32nd Infantry Division "Marche" (Italian: 32ª Divisione di fanteria "Marche") was a infantry division of the Royal Italian Army during World War II. The Marche was a mountain-type infantry division, which meant that the division's artillery and logistics were moved by pack mules, while in standard infantry divisions artillery and logistics were moved by horse-drawn limbers and carriages. Italy's real mountain warfare divisions were the six alpine divisions manned by Alpini troops. The division was formed on 22 February 1939 in Conegliano and named for the central Italian region of Marche.

== History ==
The division's lineage begins with the Brigade "Marche" established in Pesaro on 16 April 1861 with the 55th and 56th infantry regiments.

=== World War I ===
The brigade fought on the Italian front in World War I. On 31 December 1926 the brigade command was disbanded and the brigade's two regiments were transferred to other brigades: the 55th Infantry Regiment "Marche" to the X Infantry Brigade and the 56th Infantry Regiment "Marche" to the XIII Infantry Brigade. On 1 January 1928 the X and XIII infantry brigades switched the two infantry regiments.

On 22 February 1939 the 32nd Infantry Division "Marche" was formed in Conegliano and received on the same date its two namesake infantry regiments. On the same day the 32nd Artillery Regiment "Marche" was reformed in Treviso and assigned to the division. The same year the division's headquarter moved from Conegliano to Mestre, where it was joined by the 56th Infantry Regiment "Marche", which had moved from Cividale del Friuli.

=== World War II ===
In the March 1941 the Marche was assigned to the XVII Army Corps and ordered to move to the Potenza-Eboli-Padula area in the south of Italy. Before the move was completed the Marche was rerouted to Albania for the invasion of Yugoslavia. The division arrived in the Shkodër-Lezhë-Koplik area while the Yugoslav offensive against Albania was underway. However the Marche did not see combat and crossed the border on 20 April 1941 - two days after Yugoslavia had surrendered. The division took control of Dubrovnik, Trebinje, Bileća, Metković, Mostar, and islands of Mljet and Korčula. Afterward, the division was tasked with coastal defence and anti-partisan actions.

The first skirmishes with Yugoslav Partisans occurred in July 1941 near Gacko. On 6 July 1941 Giuseppe Amico assumed command of the division. On 30 July 1941 the Marche, 22nd Infantry Division "Cacciatori delle Alpi" and 48th Infantry Division "Taro" initiated a joint anti-partisan operation between Dragalj and Grahovo in the mountains border region between Montenegro and Herzegovina. In September 1941 the partisan raids on Gacko became so severe that the Marche garrisoned the town permanently. Between 9 October and 9 November 1941 units of the Marche participated in a major anti-partisan operation along the Serbia-Croatia border. Partisans interrupted the Trebinje-Bileća road between 5 and 20 December 1941 and the Marche had to engage in heavy combat to regain control of the route. In the same period, the division repulsed partisan attacks on the city of Dubrovnik and the Gabela-Dubrovnik-Kotor railroad.

From January 1942 to May 1942, the intensity of skirmishes with Yugoslav Partisans in the Bileća-Gacko-Trebinje region increased gradually. In June, 1942, a major mopping-up operation started in the Dobromani-Lastva-Plana, Bileća area. Especially heavy fighting happened at Plana, Bileća, which was initially firmly under Yugoslav Partisan control. Later, the focus of fighting shifted back to the Gabela-Dubrovnik-Kotor railroad.

The Marche participated in the Battle of the Neretva between 20 January and 17 February 1943 and in the Battle of the Sutjeska between May and June 1943. Following the announcement of the armistice of Cassibile on 8 September 1943 General Amico ordered his troops to block the 7th SS Volunteer Mountain Division Prinz Eugen from occupying Dubrovnik. Arrested during a parley with the Germans Amico was released on the condition that he would order his men to surrender, but instead he ordered them to attack the Germans. Recaptured by the Germans Amico was summarily shot on 13 September 1943, while many of his men joined the Yugoslav partisans to continue the fight against the Germans.

== Organization ==
32nd Infantry Division "Marche" organization in 1940

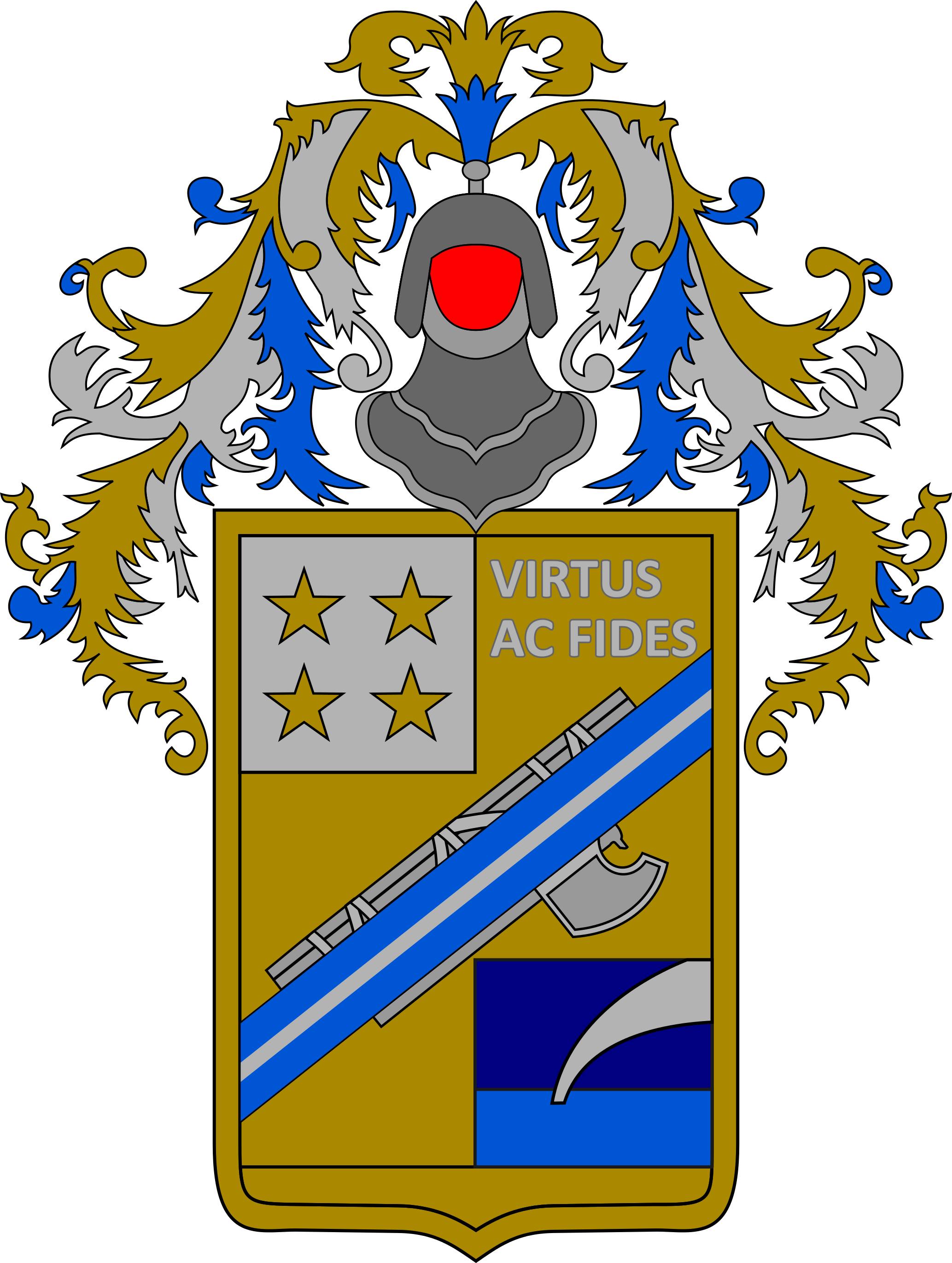
Coat of Arms of the 55th Infantry Regiment "Marche", 1939

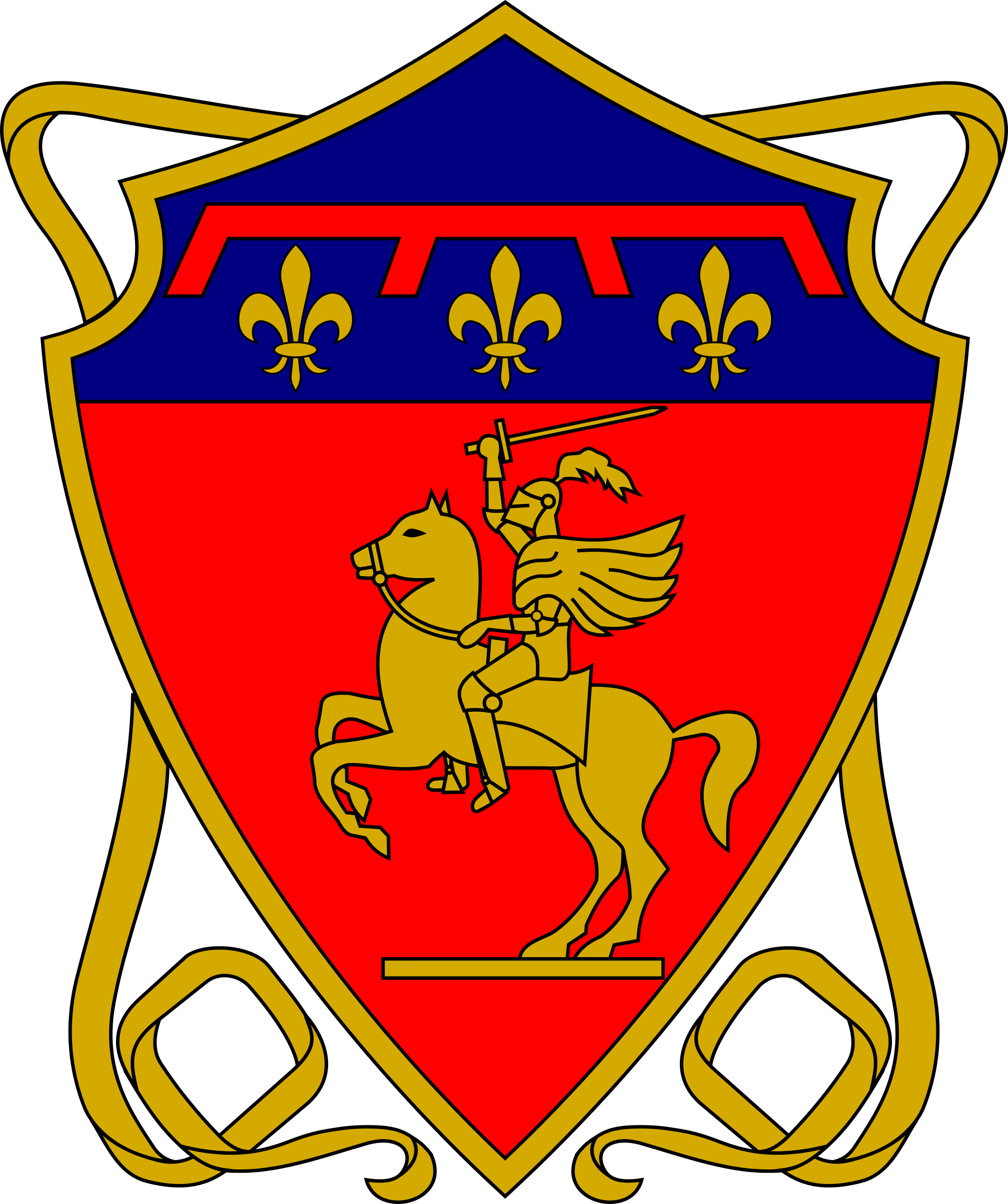
Coat of Arms of the 56th Infantry Regiment "Marche", 1939

- 32nd Infantry Division "Marche", in Mestre
  - Headquarters
    - Command Company
    - 33rd Carabinieri Section
    - 36th Carabinieri Section
    - 32nd Field Post Office
    - 32nd Infantry Division Command Transport Squad
  - 55th Infantry Regiment "Marche", in Treviso
    - Command Company
    - 3 × Fusilier battalions
    - Support Weapons Battery (65/17 mod. 13 infantry support guns)
    - Mortar Company (81mm mod. 35 mortars)
  - 56th Infantry Regiment "Marche", in Mestre
    - Command Company
    - 3 × Fusilier battalions
    - Support Weapons Battery (65/17 mod. 13 infantry support guns)
    - Mortar Company (81mm mod. 35 mortars)
  - 32nd Artillery Regiment "Marche", in Treviso
    - Command Unit
    - I Group (100/17 mod. 14 howitzers)
    - II Group (75/27 mod. 06 field guns)
    - III Group (75/13 mod. 15 mountain guns; transferred in December 1940 to the 18th Artillery Regiment "Pinerolo")
    - III Group (75/27 mod. 06 field guns; transferred in December 1940 from the 18th Artillery Regiment "Pinerolo")
    - 1 × Anti-aircraft battery (20/65 mod. 35 anti-aircraft guns)
    - Ammunition and Supply Unit
  - XXXII Mortar Battalion (81mm mod. 35 mortars)
  - 32nd Anti-tank Company (47/32 mod. 35 anti-tank guns)
  - 32nd Telegraph and Radio Operators Company
  - 39th Engineer Company
  - 2nd Medical Section
    - 3 × Field hospitals
    - 1 × Surgical unit
  - 4th Supply Section
  - 32nd Autocarrette Section
  - 142nd Transport Section

Attached:

- 49th CC.NN. Legion "San Marco"
  - XL CC.NN. Battalion
  - XLIX CC.NN. Battalion
  - 49th CC.NN. Machine Gun Company

== CROWCASS ==
The names of 29 men attached to the division can be found in the Central Registry of War Criminals and Security Suspects (CROWCASS) set up by the Anglo-American Supreme Headquarters Allied Expeditionary Force in 1945. The names can be found at: Central Registry of War Criminals and Security Suspects from the Kingdom of Italy.

== Commanding officers ==
The division's commanding officers were:

- Generale di Brigata Quirino Armellini (11 November 1938 – 5 January 1939)
- Generale di Brigata Fernando Gelich (22 February 1939 - 31 January 1940)
- Generale di Brigata Riccardo Pentimalli (1 February 1940 - 5 July 1941)
- Generale di Divisione Giuseppe Amico (6 July 1941 - 13 September 1943, executed by the Germans)
