= XXI Army Corps (Italy) =

Formation of the Italian army in World War II

The Italian XXI Army Corps was a formation of the Italian army in World War II.

== History ==
The Corps fought in Northern Africa and took part in the Western Desert Campaign and Tunisian campaign between 1940 and 1943.
It surrendered to the allies in Tunisia in May 1943, with the rest of Army Group Africa.

== Composition ==
=== In 1940 ===
- 61st Infantry Division Sirte
- 64th Infantry Division Catanzaro
- 2nd CC.NN. Division "28 Ottobre"

=== In July 1941 ===
- 27th Infantry Division Brescia
- 17th Infantry Division Pavia
- 102nd Motorised Division Trento

=== In November 1941 ===
- 55th Infantry Division Savona
- 27th Infantry Division Brescia
- 17th Infantry Division Pavia
- 102nd Motorised Division Trento
- 25th Infantry Division Bologna

=== In May 1942 ===
- 102nd Motorized Division "Trento"
- 60th Infantry Division "Sabratha"

=== In October 1942 ===
- 25th Infantry Division Bologna
- 102nd Motorised Division Trento

=== In 1943 ===
- 80th Infantry Division La Spezia
- 16th Infantry Division Pistoia

== Commanders ==
- Gen. C.A. Mario Caracciolo di Feroleto (1 October 1937 – 1 December 1939)
- Gen. C.A. Lorenzo Dalmazzo (1 December 1939 – 26 September 1940)
- Gen. D. Carlo Spatocco (26 September – 20 December 1940)
- Gen. D. Enea Navarini (1 August 1941 – 14 October 1942)
- Gen. D. Alessandro Gloria (interim : 14–26 October 1942)
- Gen. C.A. Enea Navarini (26 October 1942 – 21 February 1943)
- Gen. C.A. Paolo Berardi (21 February – 12 May 1943)

== Sources ==
- Pitt, Barrie (1980) The Crucible of War: Western Desert 1941 Jonathan Cape, London ISBN 0-224-01827-2
- Pitt, Barrie (1982) The Crucible of War: Year of Alamein 1942 Jonathan Cape, London ISBN 0-224-01771-3
- Regio Esercito
