= Four Day War =

The Four Day War may refer to:

- The Egyptian–Libyan War in 1977
- The 2016 Nagorno-Karabakh conflict
- The 2025 India–Pakistan conflict

== See also ==
- Four Days' Battle
- Four Days of Naples
- 100 Hour War, also known as the Football War
