= Four Days of Naples =

Uprising against German forces in 1943

Coordinates: 40.8333°N 14.25°E

Four Days of Naples Quattro giornate di Napoli
- Part of the Italian campaign of World War II
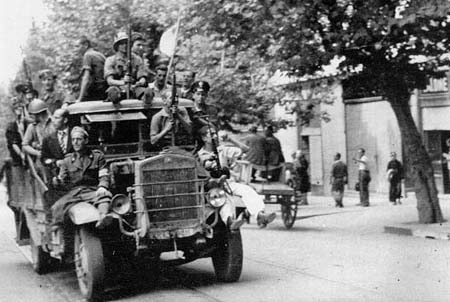
- Italian partisans celebrating the liberation of Naples
Date	27–30 September 1943
Location	Naples, Italy
Result	Resistance victory: Liberation of Naples from German occupation

Belligerents
Neapolitan Rebels	(Nazi Germany) Germany; Italian Social Republic

Commanders and leaders
• Antonio Tarsia in Curia (Vomero) • Giovanni Abbate (Vomero) • Ermete Bonomi (Materdei) • Carmine Musella (Avvocata) • Carlo Bianco • Aurelio Spoto (Capodimonte) • Stefano Fadda (Chiaia) • Francesco Cibarelli • Amedeo Manzo • Francesco Bilardo (Via Duomo) • Gennaro Zengo (Corso Giuseppe Garibaldi) • Francesco Amicarelli (Piazza Mazzini) • Mario Orbitello (Montecalvario) • Salvatore Amato (Museo) • Alberto Agresti (Via Caracciolo, Posillipo) • Raffaele Viglione (Piazza Carlo III) • Tito Murolo (Vasto)	(Nazi Germany) Walter Schöll (Commander of the Military Area of Naples) (Italian Social Republic) Domenico Tilena (Provincial Federal fascist leader of Naples)

Strength
1,589	20,000

Casualties and losses
168 killed 162 wounded	54–96 killed
- 159 unarmed civilians Total: 562 killed

The Four Days of Naples (Italian: Quattro giornate di Napoli) was an uprising in Naples, Italy, against Nazi German occupation forces from 27 September to 30 September 1943, immediately prior to the arrival of Allied forces in Naples on 1 October during World War II.

The spontaneous uprising of Neapolitan and Italian Resistance against German occupying forces, despite their limited armament, and without proper organization or planning, successfully disrupted German plans to deport Neapolitans en masse, destroy the city, and prevent Allied forces from gaining a strategic foothold.

The city was subsequently awarded the Gold Medal of Military Valor. The four days are celebrated annually and were the subject of the 1962 film The Four Days of Naples.

== Prelude ==
=== Historical background ===
From 1940 to 1943, Naples suffered heavy Allied bombing raids, causing severe damage and heavy civilian population loss. It has been calculated that 20,000 civilians died in the attacks. Over 3,000 died in the raid of 4 August 1943 alone, and around 600 were killed and 3,000 injured by the explosion of the ship Caterina Costa in port on 28 March. The city's artistic and cultural heritage also suffered damage, including the partial destruction of the Chiesa di Santa Chiara on 4 December 1942. With the Allied advance in southern Italy, antifascists in the Naples area, including Fausto Nicolini, Claudio Ferri and Adolfo Omodeo, began establishing closer contacts with the Allied commanders and requested the liberation of Naples.

From 8 September 1943, the day on which the armistice between Italy and Allied armed forces came into force, the Italian Army forces in the area drifted toward Naples, without orders, as did most of the units at the time. There, the situation was already difficult due to the unceasing bombing raids and the imbalance in forces, with 20,000 Germans opposed to 5,000 Italians in the whole of Campania. The situation in Naples soon devolved into chaos, with many higher officials, either unable to take the initiative or even directly collaborating with the Nazis, deserting the city, followed by the Italian troops. Those escaping included Riccardo Pentimalli and Ettore Del Tetto, the generals entrusted with military responsibility for Naples, who fled in civilian clothes. Del Tetto's last actions before he fled had been to hand the city over to the German army and to publish a decree banning assemblies and authorising the military to fire on those disregarding the ban. Even so, sporadic but bloody attempts at resistance arose throughout the Zanzur Barracks, to as far as the Carabinieri barracks at Pastrengo and at the 21st "Centro di Avvistamento" (Early Detection Post) of Castel dell'Ovo.

=== Turmoil ===
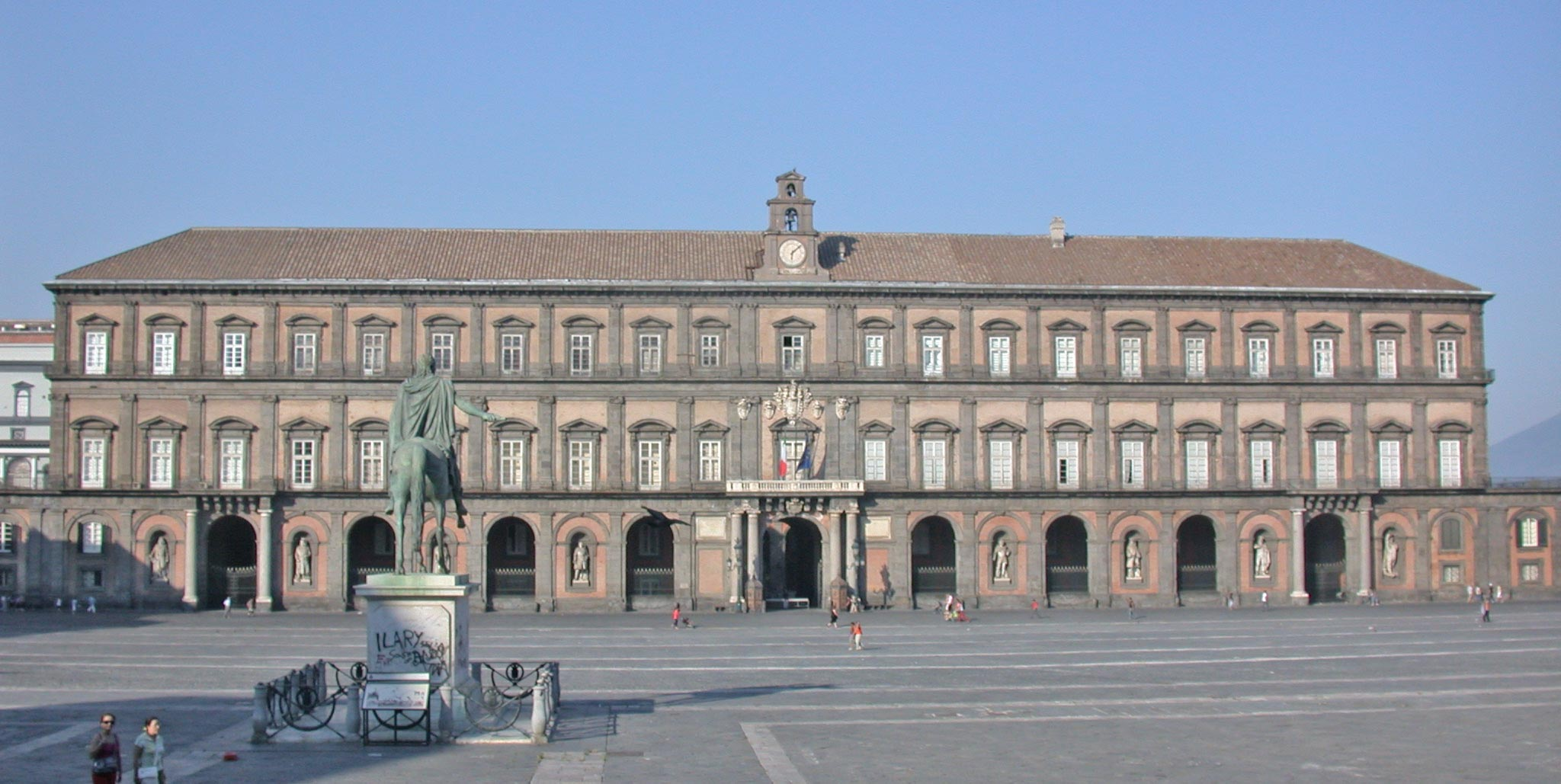
The Biblioteca Nazionale Vittorio Emanuele III in Naples where clashes took place

In the days following the armistice, episodes of intolerance and armed resistance against Naples' German occupiers intensified and were more organized, including on 1 September when a student demonstration in Piazza del Plebiscito, and the first meeting of the Liceo Sannazaro in Vomero occurred.

On 9 September, a group of citizens encountered German troops at Palazzo dei Telefoni and managed to escape to Via Santa Brigida. The latter episode involved a member of the Carabiniere, who opened fire to defend a shop from German soldiers attempting to loot it.

On 10 September, between Piazza del Plebiscito and the gardens below, the first bloody clash occurred, with the Neapolitans successfully blocking several German motor vehicles. In the fights, three German sailors and three German soldiers died. The occupiers managed to free some of those imprisoned by the rioters thanks to an injunction by an Italian official, who summoned his countrymen to surrender some of their hostages and all of their weapons. Retaliation for the Piazza del Plebiscito clashes came quickly, and the Germans set fire to the National Library and opened fire on the crowd that had gathered there.

On 12 September, numerous soldiers were killed on the streets of Naples, and about 4,000 Italian soldiers and civilians were deported for forced labor. An announcement on 22 September decreed compulsory labor for all men from 18 to 33, who were to be deported to work camps in northern Italy and Germany. Neapolitans refused, and, as men were rounded up and brought to the stadium in the Vomero, a civilian uprising broke out.

=== State of siege ===
The same day, Colonel Walter Schöll assumed command of the military occupiers in the city and declared a curfew and a state of siege, with orders to execute all those responsible for hostile actions against German troops, and up to 100 Neapolitans for every German killed.

The following proclamations appeared on the walls of the city on 13 September:

With immediate action from today, I assume the absolute control with full powers of the city of Naples and the surrounding areas.

1. Every single citizen who behaves calmly will enjoy my protection. On the other hand, anyone who openly or surreptitiously acts against the German armed forces will be executed. Moreover, the home of the miscreant and its immediate surroundings will be destroyed and reduced to ruins. Every German soldier wounded or murdered will be avenged a hundred times.
2. I order a curfew from 8 pm to 6 am. Only in case of alarm will it be allowed to use the road in order to reach the nearest shelter.
3. A state of siege is proclaimed.
4. Within 24 hours all weapons and ammunition of any kind, including shotguns, hand grenades, etc., must be surrendered. Anyone who, after that period, is found in possession of a weapon will be immediately executed. The delivery of weapons and ammunition shall be made to the German military patrols.
5. People must keep calm and act reasonably.

The orders were followed by the shooting of eight prisoners of war in via Cesario Console, and a tank opened fire upon students who were beginning to gather in the nearby university and several Italian sailors in front of the stock market.

A young sailor was executed on the stairs of the headquarters, and thousands of people were forced to attend by German troops. On the same day, 500 people were also forcibly deported to Teverola, near Caserta, and forced to watch the execution of 14 policemen, who had offered armed resistance to the occupying forces.

== Events immediately before the Four Days ==
Together, the war's indiscriminate executions, looting, control of the civilian population, increasing poverty and destruction, spurred a completely spontaneous rebellion in the city, without external organization.

On 22 September, inhabitants of the Vomero quarter were able to steal ammunition from an Italian artillery battery. On 25 September 250 rifles were stolen from a school.

Colonel Schöll on 23 September ordered additional measures to suppress the population, including the evacuation (within 20 hours that same day) of the entire coastal area up 300 meters (328 yd) from the waterfront. Approximately 240,000 people would be forced to abandon their homes to allow the creation of a "military security zone", potentially a prelude to the port's destruction. Almost simultaneously, a manifesto from the city's prefect called for compulsory work for all males between the ages of 18 and 30, in effect a forced deportation to labour camps in Germany. Only 150 Neapolitans out of the planned 30,000 responded to the call, which led Schöll to send soldiers into Naples to round up and immediately execute resisters.

In response, on 26 September, an unarmed crowd poured into the streets, opposed the Nazi roundups and freed the resisters from deportation. The rioters were joined by former Italian soldiers who had thus far remained hidden.

== Four days ==
=== 27 September ===
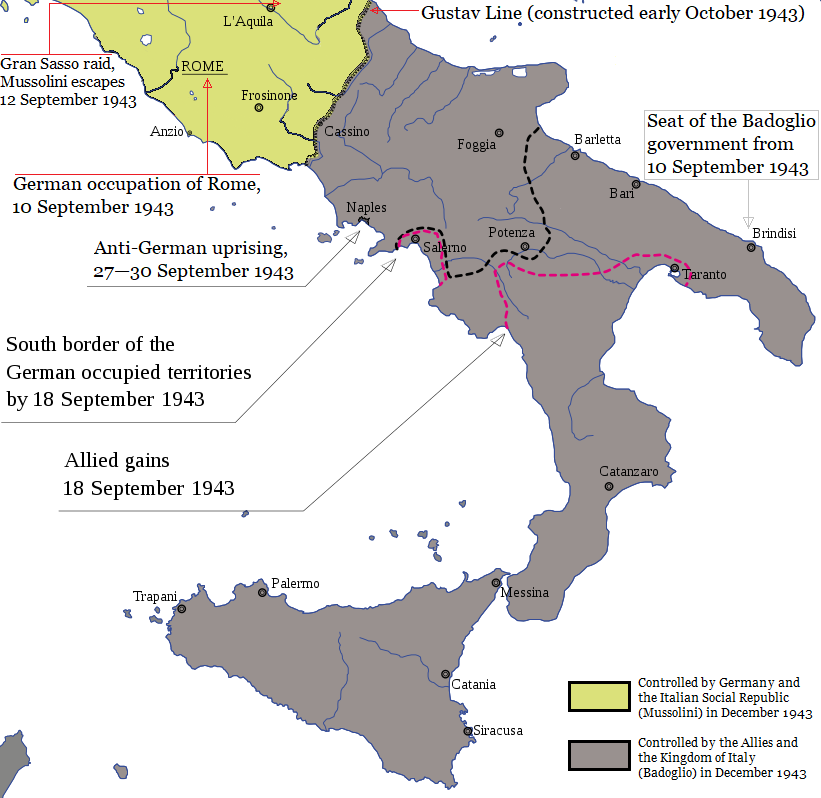
Italian military situation in September 1943

On 27 September, large numbers of German troops captured about 8,000 Neapolitans, and 400-500 armed rioters responded in attack.

One of the first outbreaks of fighting occurred in Vomero, where a group of armed men stopped a German car and killed the German driver. The same day, fierce fighting followed in different areas of the city between the insurgents and German soldiers. The Germans began evacuating, spurred by news, later proved to be false, of an imminent Allied landing at Bagnoli.

An Italian lieutenant, Enzo Stimolo, led a group of 200 insurgents against a weapons depot at Castel Sant'Elmo, which was captured that evening although German reinforcements arrived from the Villa Floridiana and the Campo Sportivo del Littorio areas.

Meanwhile, a group of citizens moved on the Parco di Capodimonte (the Capodimonte Park) in response to rumours that Germans were executing prisoners there. An insurgent plan to prevent German engineers from destroying the Ponte della Sanità (the Maddalena Cerasuolo bridge) and thereby isolating the city center was devised and carried out the following day.

That evening, insurgents attacked and plundered weapons armories in the barracks at Via Foria and Via San Giovanni a Carbonara.

=== 28 September ===
On 28 September, fighting increased with further Neapolitan citizens joining the riot. In Materdei, a German patrol that had taken shelter in a civil building was surrounded and besieged for hours, until the arrival of reinforcements. Three Neapolitans died in the battle.

At Porta Capuana, a group of 40 men, armed with rifles and machine guns, set up a roadblock, killing six enemy soldiers and capturing four. Fighting also broke out in Maschio Angioino, Vasto and Monteoliveto.

Germans launched raids in Vomero and took prisoners inside the Campo Sportivo del Littorio, which prompted an assault on the sports field by a party led by Enzo Stimolo, which liberated prisoners the following day.

=== 29 September ===
On the third day of the riot, the streets of Naples witnessed fierce clashes. As no connection could be established with national antifascist organizations such as the Fronte Nazionale (an offshoot of the Comitato di Liberazione Nazionale), the insurrection was still without central direction, and operations were in the hands of local leaders.

In Giuseppe Mazzini Square, a substantial German party, reinforced by tanks, attacked 50 rebels, killing 12 and injuring more than 15. The workers' quarter of Ponticelli suffered a heavy artillery bombardment, after which, German units committed several indiscriminate massacres among the population. Other fighting took place near the Capodichino Airport and Piazza Ottocalli, in which three Italian airmen were killed.

In the same hours, at the German headquarters at Corso Vittorio Emanuele, which was under repeated attack by insurgents, negotiations were started between Schöll and Stimolo for the return of the Campo Sportivo prisoners in exchange for the free retreat of the Germans from Naples.

=== 30 September ===
While the German troops had already begun the evacuation of the city before the arrival of Anglo-American forces from Nocera Inferiore, Antonio Tarsia in Curia, a high school teacher, proclaimed himself as head of the rebels and assumed full civil and military powers. Among other things, he issued provisions regarding the precise opening hours for shops and citizens' discipline.

The fighting did not cease, and the German guns in the Capodimonte Heights shelled the area between Port'Alba and Piazza Mazzini for the whole day. Other fighting occurred in the area of Porta Capuana.

The fleeing Germans left behind them fires and massacres, including the burning of the State Archives of Naples, which caused a great loss of historical information and documents. A few days later, an explosion occurred at the Palazzo delle Poste, Naples, which was attributed to German explosives.

== Liberation of Naples ==
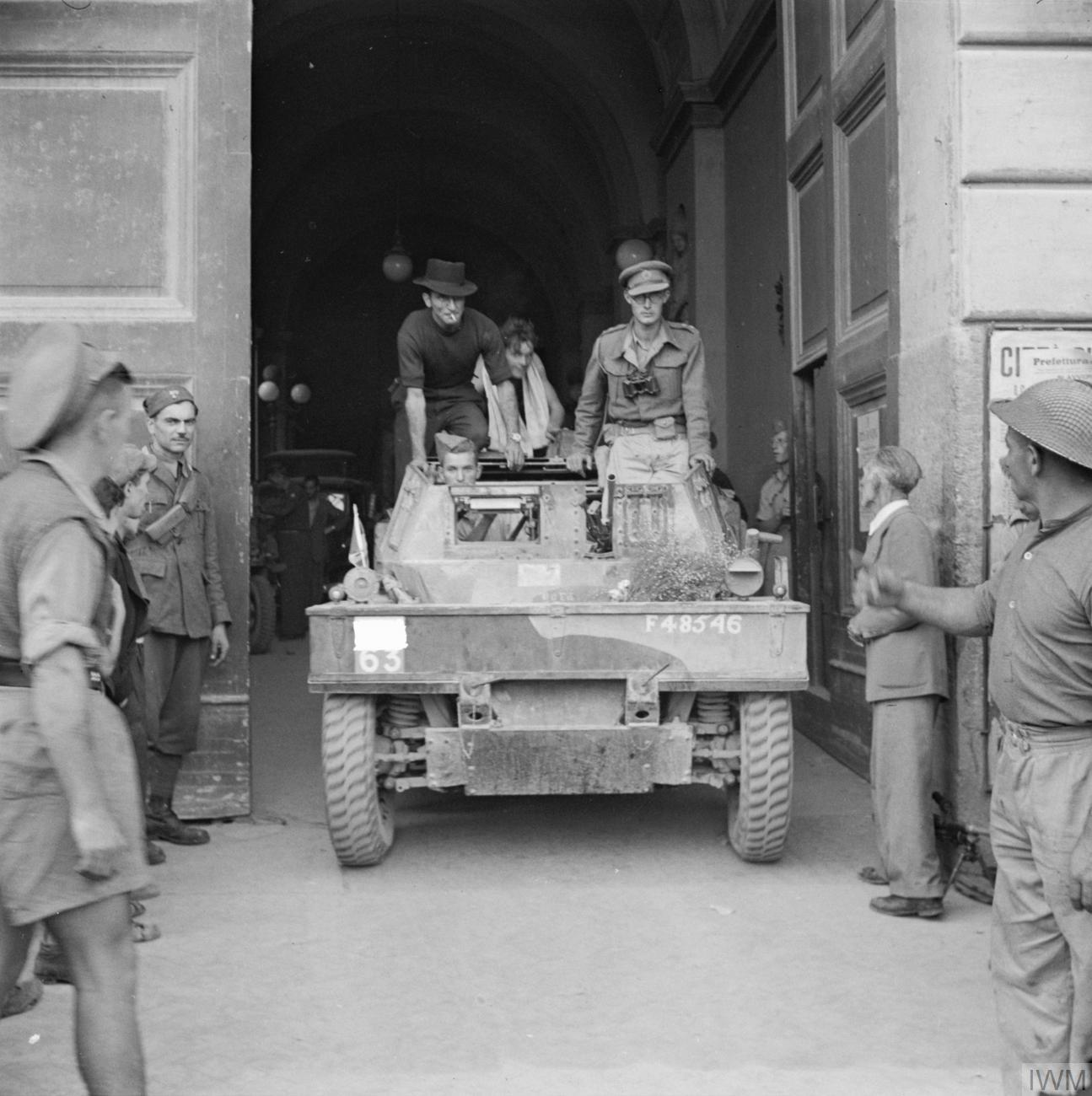
Daimler scout car of 1st King's Dragoon Guards at the town hall in Naples, 1 October 1943

At 09:30 on 1 October, armored patrols of the King's Dragoon Guards were the first Allied forces to reach Naples, followed by the Royal Scots Greys reinforced by troops of the 82nd Airborne Division. At the end of the day, the German commander-in-chief in Italy—Generalfeldmarschall Albert Kesselring—considered the retreat successfully concluded.

Statistics for the Four Days of Naples vary; according to some authors, 168 rioters and 159 unarmed citizens were killed. According to the postwar Ministerial Commission for the Recognition of Partisan Victims, 155 were killed, but the registers of the Poggioreale cemetery listed 562 deaths.

In contrast to other resistance episodes in Italy after the armistice of 8 September, which also involved Italian fascists, most of the fighting was between Italians and Germans. The revolt prevented Germans from organizing resistance in Naples against an Allied offensive or destroying the city before a German retreat, as Adolf Hitler had ordered.

On 22 December, Generals Riccardo Pentimalli and Ettore Deltetto, who had abandoned Naples to the Germans after 8 September, were sentenced by the High Court of Justice to 20 years in military prison, for active collaboration with Germans. Domenico Tilena, the head of the fascist provincial section during the riots, was sentenced to six years and eight months.

== In popular culture ==
The historical episode of the Naples rebellion was recalled in Nanni Loy's 1962 film The Four Days of Naples, which was nominated for Oscars for Best Foreign Film and Best Screenplay. The final scenes of the film Tutti a casa starring Alberto Sordi (1960) also depicted the events, specifically those of 28 September.

== Sources ==
- Aversa, Nino (1943). Napoli sotto il terrore tedesco. Naples.
- Barbagallo, Corrado. Napoli contro il terrore nazista. Naples: Maone.
- Barbagallo, Corrado (1954). Napoli contro il terrore nazista. Naples: Maone.
- Battaglia, Roberto. Storia della Resistenza italiana: (8 settembre 1943 – 25 aprile 1945).
- Caserta, Renato. Ai due lati della Barricata. La Resistenza a Napoli e le Quattro Giornate. Arte Tipografica, 2003.
- De Jaco, Aldo (1946). La città insorge: le quattro giornate di Napoli. Rome: Editori Riuniti.
- Longo, Luigi (1947). Un popolo alla macchia. Milan: Arnoldo Mondadori Editore.
- Tarsia In Curia, Antonino (1950). La verità sulle quattro giornate di Napoli. Naples: Genovese. ISBN 88-7104-735-4.
- Tarsia In Curia, Antonino (1954). Napoli negli anni di guerra. Turin: Einaudi.
- Giovanni Artieri, ed. (1963). Le Quattro giornate. Scritti e testimonianze. Naples: Marotta.
- Grassi, Franco (14 January 1973); Il Mattino
- "Napoli: 4 giorni sulle barricate". Storia Illustrata (311). 4 October 1983.
- Gleijeses, Vittorio (1987). La Storia di Napoli. Naples: Edizioni del Giglio.
- Bocca, Giorgio (1993). Il Provinciale. Milan: Mondadori. ISBN 88-04-37419-5.
- Erra, Enzo (1993). Napoli 1943. Le Quattro Giornate che non ci furono. Milan: Longanesi. ISBN 88-304-1163-9.
- Ferraro, Ermes (1993). "La resistenza napoletana e le 'quattro giornate'". In Antonino Drago and Gino Stefani (ed.). Una strategia di pace: la Difesa Popolare Nonviolenta. Bologna: fuoriTHEMA. pp. 89–95.
- Ferraro, Ermes. "Le trenta giornate di Napoli". La lotta non-armata nella resistenza (atti del convegno tenuto a Roma il 25.10.1993). Rome: Centro Studi Difesa Civile (quaderno n.1). pp. 52–57.
- Bocca, Giorgio (1995). Storia dell'Italia partigiana. Settembre 1943–Maggio 1945. Milan: Mondadori. ISBN 88-420-0142-2.
- Petacco, Arrigo (1996). La nostra guerra. Milan: Mondadori. ISBN 88-04-41325-5.
- Montanelli, Indro; Mario Cervi (1996). L'Italia della disfatta. Rizzoli.
- De Jaco, Aldo (1998). Napoli, settembre 1943. Dal fascismo alla Repubblica. Naples: Vittorio Pironti Editore.
- Parisi, Giovanni (2017). Il Muro di Napoli. Naples: Homo Scrivens.
- Chiapponi, Anna (2003). Le quattro giornate di Napoli. Castel San Giovanni: Pontegobbo. ISBN 88-86754-58-2.
- Schettini, G. G. (1943). Le barricate di Napoli. Naples: Tipografia Artigianelli.
- Secchia, Aldo (1973). Cronistoria del 25 aprile 1945. Milan: Feltrinelli.
- Gribaudi, Gabriella (2005). Guerra totale. Tra bombe alleate e violenze naziste. Napoli e il fronte meridionale 1940–1944. Turin: Bollati Boringhieri.
- Aragno, Giuseppe (2017). Le Quattro Giornate di Napoli – Storie di Antifascisti. Naples: Edizioni Intra Moenia. ISBN 978-8874212033.
