= General Gonzaga =

General Gonzaga may refer to:

- Annibale Gonzaga (1602–1668), Holy Roman Empire general
- Maurizio Ferrante Gonzaga (1861–1938), Italian general
- Gianfrancesco I Gonzaga, Marquess of Mantua (1395–1444), Venetian Armies general
