= Vincenzo Gonzaga =

Vincenzo Gonzaga may refer to:

- Vincenzo I Gonzaga, Duke of Mantua (1562–1612)
- Vincenzo II Gonzaga, Duke of Mantua (1594–1627)
- Vicente de Gonzaga y Doria (1602–1694), known in Italian as Vincenzo Gonzaga Doria
- Vincenzo Gonzaga, Duke of Guastalla (1634–1714)

== See also ==
- Giovanni Vincenzo Gonzaga (1540–1591), cardinal
- Ferrante Vincenzo Gonzaga (1889–1943), soldier
