= Maddalena Cerasuolo =

Italian antifascist partisan (1920–1999)

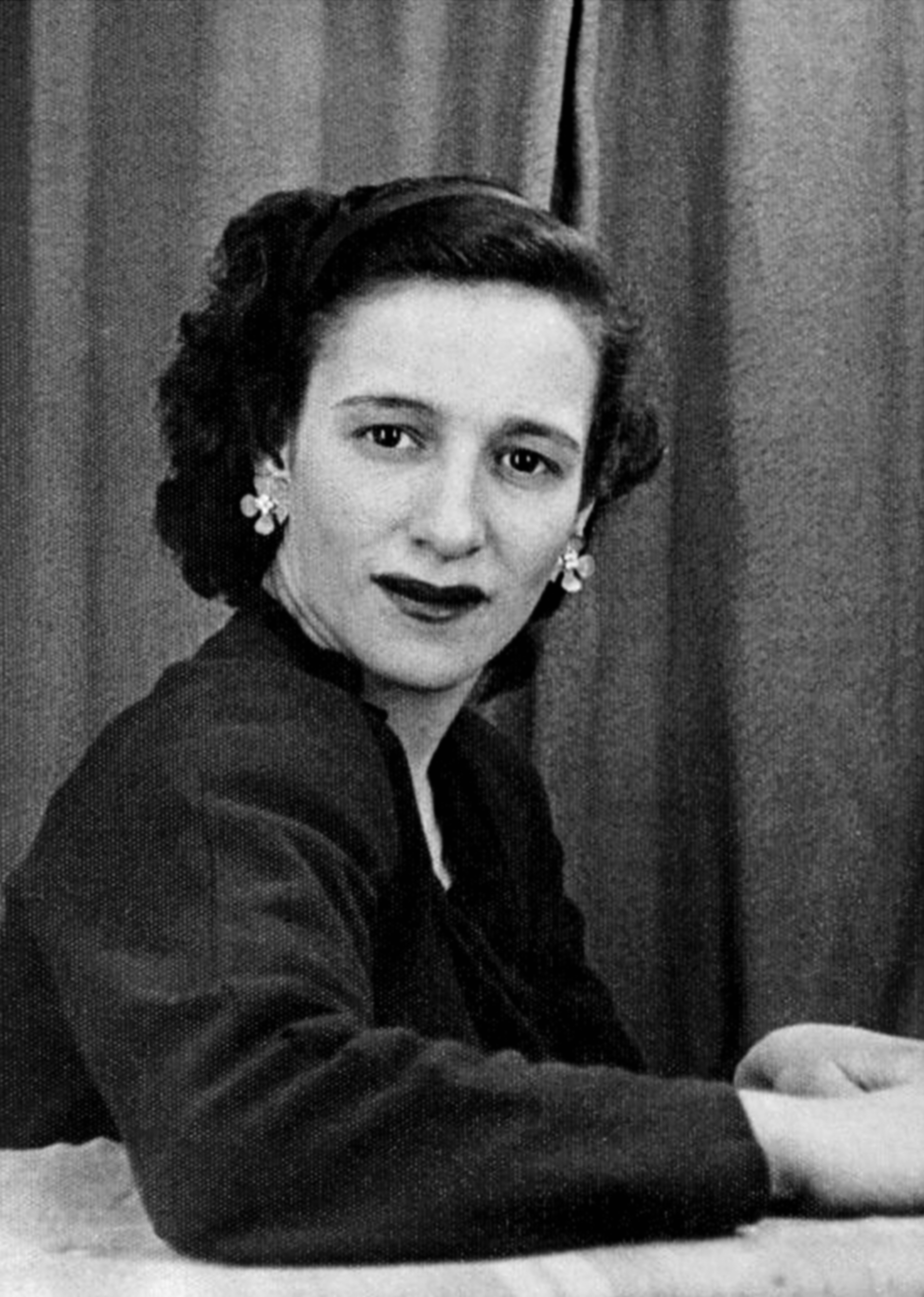
Maddalena Cerasuolo, Italian partisan, bronze medal for military valor

Maddalena Cerasuolo, also known as Lenuccia (Naples, 2 February 1920 – Naples, 23 October 1999), was an Italian patriot and antifascist partisan.

She is remembered especially for having actively participated with a significant role in the revolt against the Nazi army that occurred in Naples from 27 to 30 September 1943, which is remembered as the Four days of Naples.

== Biography ==
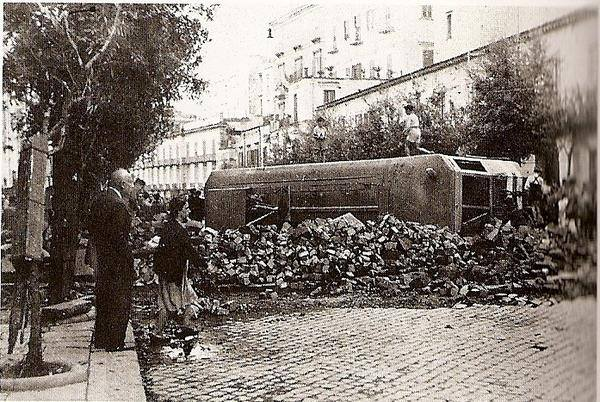
Rubble and downed vehicles in via Santa Teresa degli Scalzi, Naples, due to Allied air bombing, used as barricades and roadblock by the Italian resistance movement (28 September 1943)

The life of Maddalena, as well as that of many of her peers, was split in two parts by World War II. Nevertheless, the war allowed her to stand out in the ranks of the Resistenza and as a secret agent, working with the United Kingdom.

After the war, she continued to live in Naples, until her death in 1999, after having married with surname Morgese and having two children, Gaetana and Gennaro.

=== Early years ===
Maddalena's parents belonged to the working class; she was the daughter of Annunziata Capuozzo and Carlo Cerasuolo, who lived in the Stella neighborhood in Naples together with her other five sisters Titina, Maria, Anna, Dora, Rosaria and two brothers Giovanni and Vincenzo.

The father, Carlo, who was working as cook, in the 1910s participated in the Italo-Turkish War and also later in the Resistenza when he was registered and imprisoned several times for acts of resistance against Fascism. During World War II, he was initially employed by the company Ansaldo to manage the canteen. Later he was unemployed, thereby he put up an itinerant stall where he prepared and sold fried pizzas.

The mother, Annunziata, was employed as help-cook at Ansaldo too, following her husband. Later she helped him in his new activity.

When the war was breaking out, Maddalena was about 20 years old, working as craftswoman at a small shoe factory.

=== Entering the Resistenza ===
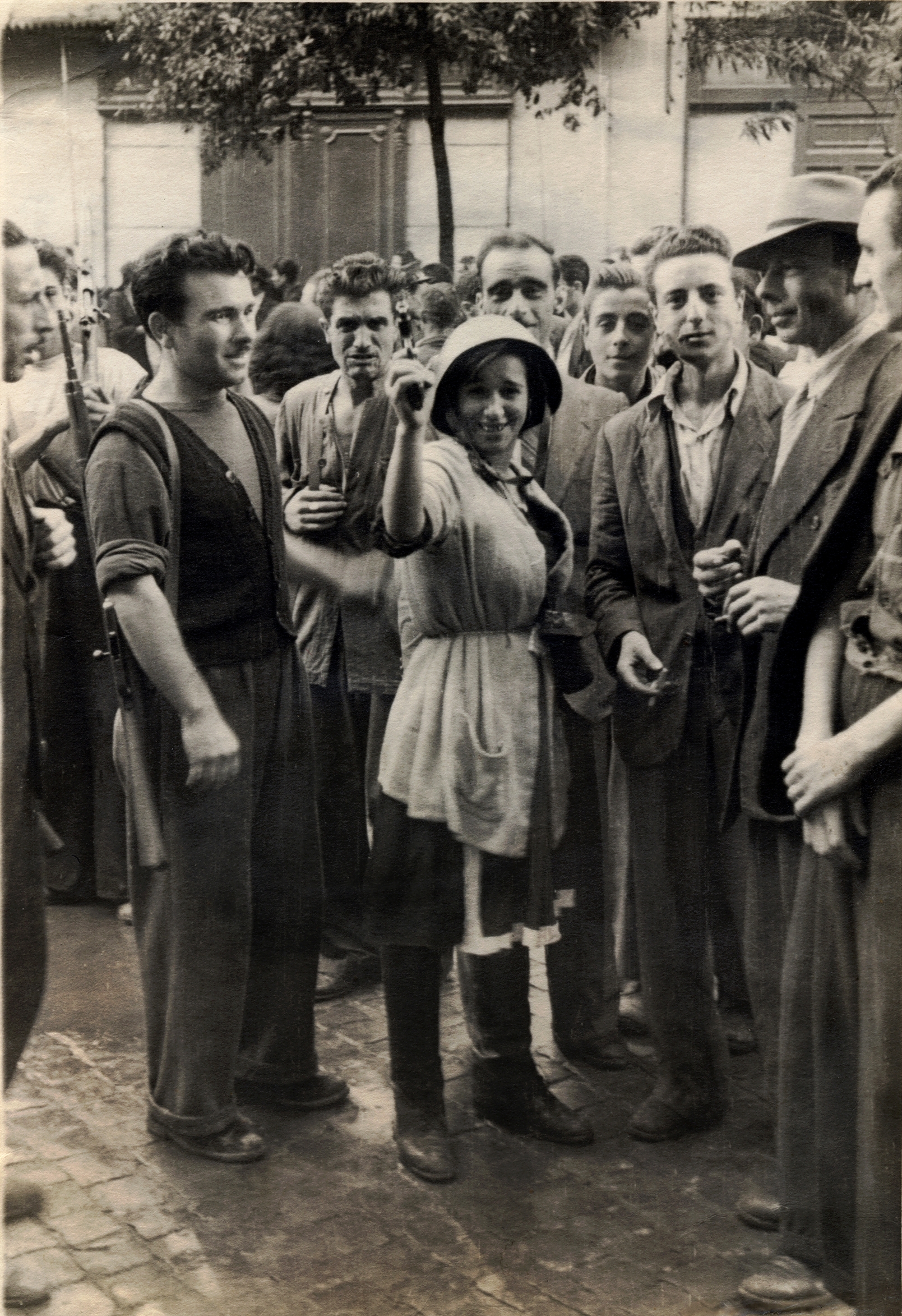
Maddalena Cerasuolo and Antonio Amoretti armed waiting for taking action in Santa Teresa al Museo – vico della Purità, Naples, 30 September 1943

During the war, Maddalena stood out when she participated in the gunfights that happened in the Materdei neighborhood, to avoid the German troops plundering the shoe factory near to vico delle Trone, in exchange for the weapons delivery. She volunteered to go alone on the prowl to calculate the size of the German troops and later to speak with Nazi officials, despite the risk of not being accorded Geneva Convention rights, as a military delegate.

Maddalena Cerasuolo participated in the battle against the German troops by defending the Ponte della Sanità with the partisans of the neighborhoods Materdei and Stella, led by her father Carlo Cerasuolo, lieutenant Dino Del Prete and firefighter officer Vinicio Giacomelli. They contributed to keeping open an important entranceway to the city, and also an important branch of the aqueduct that supplied the center of Naples.

For this episode she received a Medal of Military Valor and she was invited to the Royal Palace by General Montgomery, who hugged and kissed her.

=== Service with British Special Forces ===
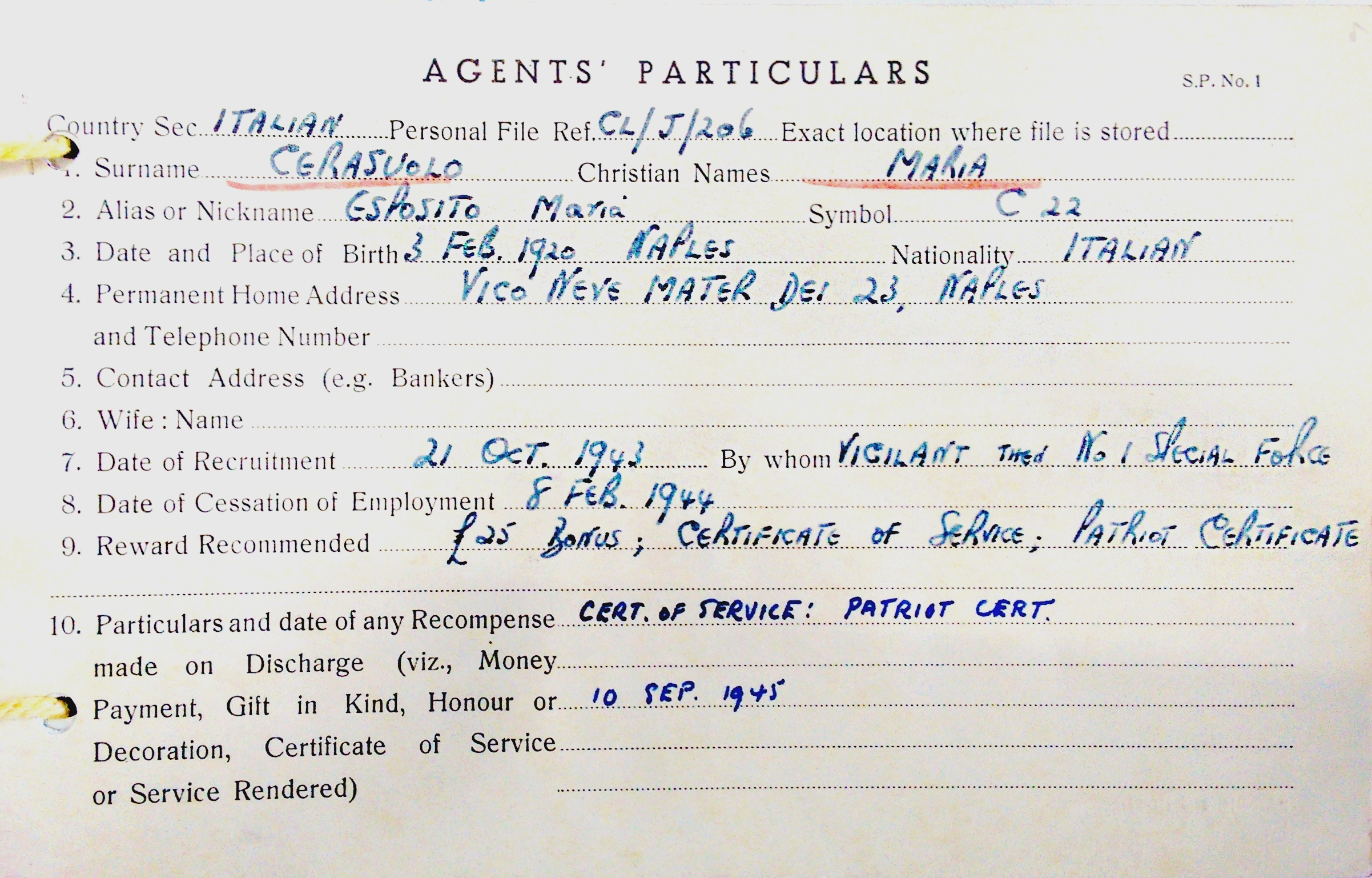
Maddalena Cerasuolo's "Agents' Particulars" file in SOE records

Maddalena Cerasuolo, with her alias "Maria Esposito", served as agent number "C22", from 23 October 1943 to 8 February 1944. She operated with No.1 Special Force, a unit of the Special Operations Executive (SOE).

In the personal file of the SOE Maddalena is recorded as housewife, unmarried, living in the vico della Neve, 23, Materdei, Naples at her father, Carlo Cerasuolo's, house.

After a short training course at Castello Mezzatorre in Forio di Ischia, she participated in the missions named "Hillside II" and "Kelvin".

The Hillside II mission consisted of passing beyond enemy lines, but it ended with three failed attempts.

Kelvin was a maritime mission, using a motor torpedo boat based in Corsica, to reach the coast of Liguria from Bastia and sabotage, with explosive, military sites deep in the enemy rear. This mission was also aborted, after five attempts without landing. During the attempts, she lost the suitcase of spare clothes she was carrying (for which she was later reimbursed by SOE).

Still working with the SOE, Maddalena parachuted behind enemy lines, in the sector from Rome to Montecassino, to collect information on German strategic intentions. She had to pretend to be a maid of the artist Anna d'Andria, who was collaborating by giving high society parties.

Her war service was summarised as follows:

Subject took a conspicuous part in Naples insurrection. She help[ed] build barricades and took part in the fighting with rifle and hand grenades. She was discharged on 8 Feb. 1944 and paid up to date & 7,500 lire for clothing lost. She received no bonus or certificate of service.

— SOE, Agents registers

== Recognition ==
Cerasuolo received recognition, both during her lifetime - such as the Medal of Military Valor and other prestigious awards - and following her death - such as an eponymous renaming in the city of Naples.

=== Military recognition ===
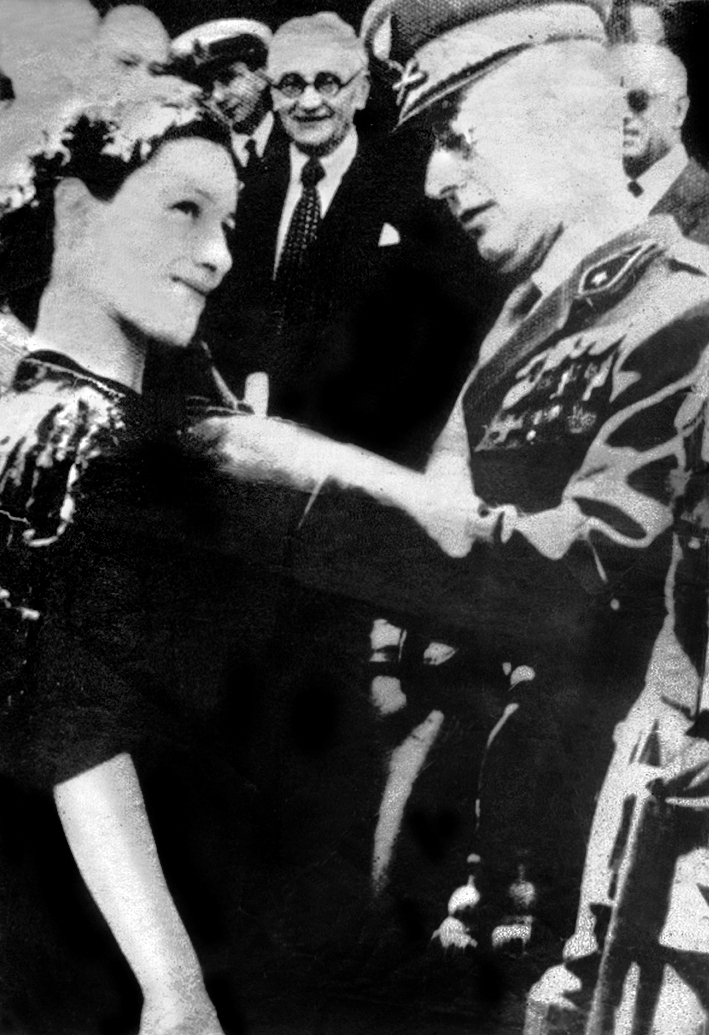
Maddalena Cerasuolo Bronze Medal of Military Valor decoration

On 24 May 1946 she was honored with the Bronze Medal of Military Valor with the following citation:

After speaking as speaker with the Germans in Vico delle Trone, she stood out in the following battle. In the same day, she participated [in] the fight in defense of the bridge Ponte della Sanità, next to her father and the partisans of Materdei e Stella neighborhoods.

— Italiana Republic statement

The collaboration with the SOE was recognized, besides with economic reimbursement, also with the following acknowledgement:

For her proud behavior and for the contribution to the cause of liberty, in the name of this Command, I tribute her a praise and I thank her.

=== Civilian recognition ===
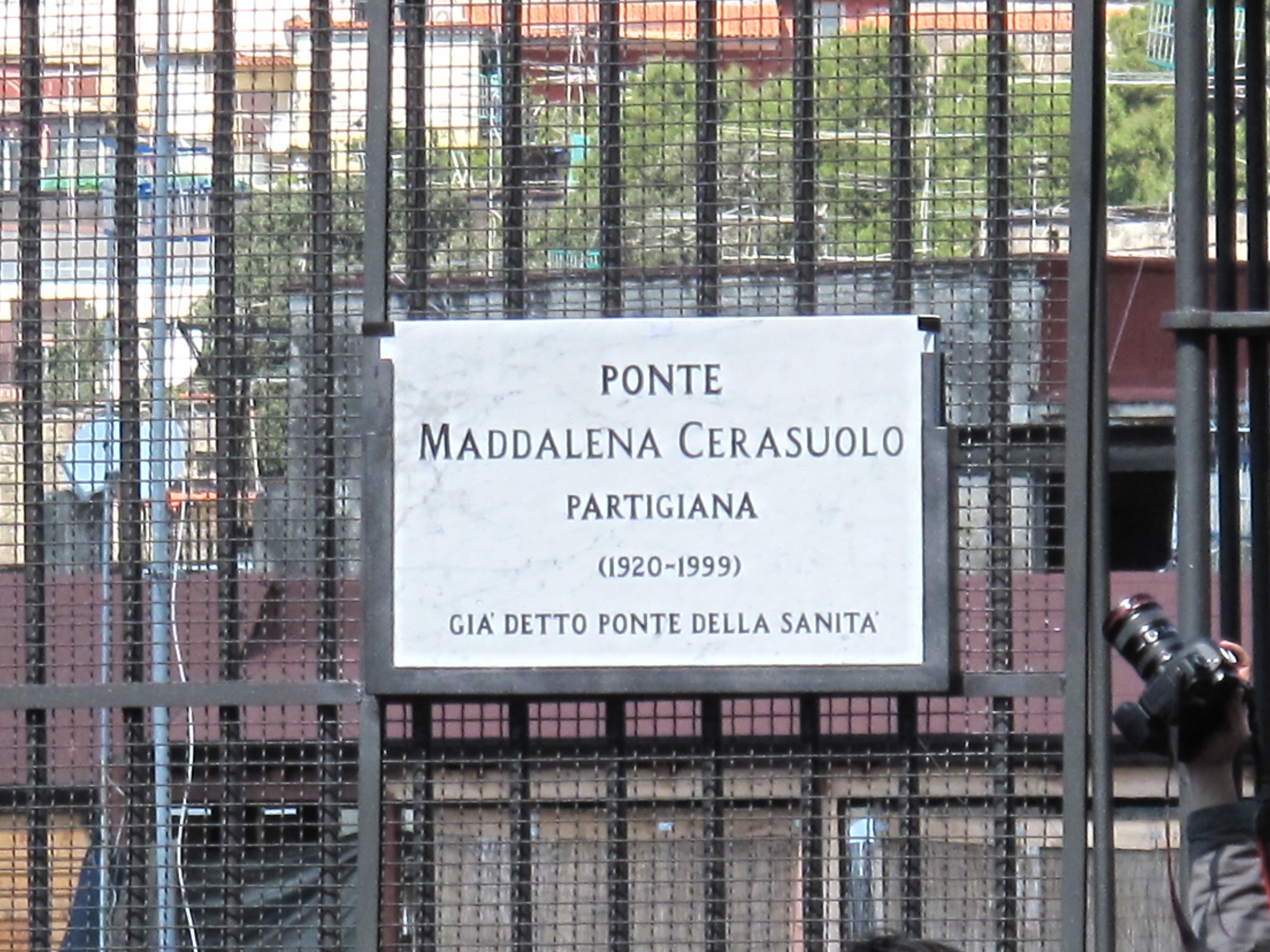
The plate bears the new name of the bridge previously called Ponte della Sanità

At the end of the war she received a certificate of merit signed by Capt. Hugh Sanderson Carruthers, RA, (1906-1994) of SOE.

The year after her death, on 3 March 2000, the mayor Rosa Russo Iervolino inaugurated a commemorative plaque for Maddalena Cerasuolo, placed by Comune di Napoli and Istituto Campano per la Storia della Resistenza.

=== Popular culture ===
Maddalena Cerasuolo's memory is held in the culture of the city of Naples, since she is quoted in several texts about the Resistenza and the Four days of Naples. Sometimes her story is brought up also in support of the thesis that Neapolitan resistance was not led by spontaneous riots, as is largely believed, but as the result of activity organized locally, within an internationally agreed strategy.

==== Books ====
In 2014, her daughter Gaetana Morgese published a book dedicated to her biography.

She is quoted in several Italian books, such as the romance Il paradiso dei diavoli by Franco di Mare, 2013, in Le donne erediteranno la terra and in Possa il mio sangue servire by Aldo Cazzullo, 2016 and finally in Il treno dei bambini by Viola Ardone.

==== Music ====
In 1995, Carlo Faiello wrote lyrics and music of a song dedicated to Maddalena Cerasuolo, entitled "Maddalena", which was interpreted by several artists such as:

- Nuova Compagnia di Canto Popolare (1995)
- Lina Sastri (2000)
- Anna Maria Castelli (2010)
- Neapolis in fabula (2011)
- Paola Subrizi Quartet (2018)

== See also ==
- Four days of Naples
- Italian resistance movement
- Special Operations Executive (SOE)
- History of women in the Italian Resistance

== Bibliography ==
- Gaetana Morgese (2010). La guerra di mamma. Maddalena "Lenuccia" Cerasuolo nelle quattro giornate di Napoli. Napoli: Massa. ISBN 978-88-95827-24-7.
- Pietro Secchia (1968). Enciclopedia dell'antifascismo e della Resistenza. Vol. 2. La Pietra. p. 130.
- Giuseppe Aragno (2017). Le Quattro Giornate di Napoli. Storie di Antifascisti. Napoli: Intra moenia.
- Sara Prossomartiri (2014). I Signori di Napoli. Newton Compton Editori. ISBN 978-88-541-7346-0.
