= Riccardo Pentimalli =

Italian general (1884–1953)

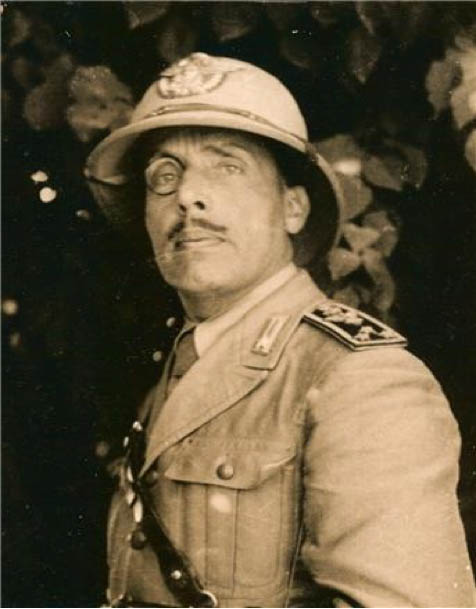
- Born: 29 February 1884; Palmi, Kingdom of Italy
- Died: 23 May 1953 (aged 69); Venice, Italy
- Military career
- Allegiance: Kingdom of Italy
- Branch: Royal Italian Army
- Rank: Lieutenant general
- Commands: 5th Field Artillery Regiment; Bra Artillery School; 1st Territorial Defence Sector; 32nd Infantry Division Marche; 151st Infantry Division Perugia; XIX Army Corps
- Conflicts: Italo-Turkish War; World War I; Second Italo-Ethiopian War; World War II; Axis invasion of Yugoslavia; Operation Achse
- Awards: Silver Medal of Military Valor

Riccardo Pentimalli (29 February 1884 in Palmi – 23 May 1953 in Venice) was an Italian general during World War II.

== Biography ==
He was born in Palmi on 29 February 1884, the son of Luigi Pentimalli and Giuseppina Contestabile. After attending the Royal Military Academy of Artillery and Engineers in Turin, he participated in the Italo-Turkish War as a second lieutenant of artillery in Libya. At the outbreak of the First World War, with the rank of captain, he was assigned to the fort of Punta Corbin in the Val d'Astico (Vicentine Alps); he was later transferred to the Fourth Army. On 3 November 1918, with a safe conduct of the Italian Supreme Command signed by General Pietro Badoglio, he was sent to Vienna as a member of the armistice commission. Upon returning from Austria, he was given command of the 5th Field Artillery Regiment and later of the Bra Artillery School.

During the Second Italo-Ethiopian War he held the position of chief of staff of the II Army Corps in East Africa. In July 1937 he was promoted to brigadier general and in September 1938 he was briefly appointed commander of the 1st Territorial Defence Sector, before becoming deputy commander of the 5th Infantry Division Cosseria until March 1939. He was then attached to the Treviso Army Corps, becoming its artillery commander in April 1939; he later became commander of the artillery of the XIV Army Corps.

On 1 February 1940 Pentimalli was given command of the 32nd Infantry Division Marche, stationed near Treviso, and on 31 May, ten days before Italy's entry into World War II, he was promoted to major general. In March 1941 the Division was transferred to Calabria and a few weeks later to Albania; in April 1941 Pentimalli led a battle group formed by his division, a tank group of the 131st Armoured Division Centauro and Blackshirt units, during the invasion of Yugoslavia, capturing Kotor, Dubrovnik and Split, and taking large numbers of Yugoslav prisoners. For this success he was awarded a Silver Medal of Military Valor. Troops of the Marche Division also found a large part of the Yugoslav gold reserves, hidden in a cave; 1,120 crates containing about 56 tons of gold in bars and coins, which Pentimalli transferred by land, to Trieste, delivering them to the representatives of the Bank of Italy.

On 26 June 1941 he returned to Italy, and on 13 August he assumed command of the newly formed 151st Infantry Division Perugia, initially stationed in the eponymous city. In December the Division was transferred to the Balkans, initially in Croatia and Montenegro and later in Albania, participating anti-partisan operations. In August 1943 Pentimalli was promoted to lieutenant general and left command of the division, returning to Italy.

On 30 August 1943 he was given command of the XIX Army Corps, in charge of the defense of Campania; he de facto assumed command of the Corps on 3 September 1943, the same day the Armistice of Cassibile was secretly signed. The XIX Corps, headquartered in Santa Maria Capua Vetere, was composed of the 9th Infantry Division Pasubio, decimated by the losses sustained in Russia, of the 222nd Coastal Division and of the XXXII Coastal Brigade, the latter two being largely formed by poorly trained and equipped territorial troops.

Following the proclamation of the armistice on 8 September, Pentimalli rejected German demands for the disarmament of his troops, but agreed to keep them confined in their barracks "if the Germans will abstain from acts of violence towards the civilian population". He took no action to prevent the German takeover in the area under the control of his troops, leaving his subordinates without orders, and eventually fled in civilian clothes along with General Ettore Deltetto and his chief of staff, only reappearing on 1 October, when the Allies entered Naples.

Pentimalli and Del Tetto were later arrested and put under trial for collaborationism and dereliction of duty for their failure to defend Naples. They were acquitted of the accusation of collaborationism, but sentenced to twenty years' imprisonment for "abandonment of command" on 24 December 1944; the High Court of Justice, while admitting "the overwhelming superiority of the German forces", stated that defenders could have done "something more and better".

The sentence was overturned by the Court of Cassation on 27 December 1946, stating that "the basic elements that guarantee the proper conduct of a trial" had not been observed by the High Court. Pentimalli was thus released and reinstated into his rank, while Del Tetto had died in prison in April 1945.

Pentimalli died from cancer in Venice on 23 May 1953.
