= Enea Navarini =

Italian General during World War II

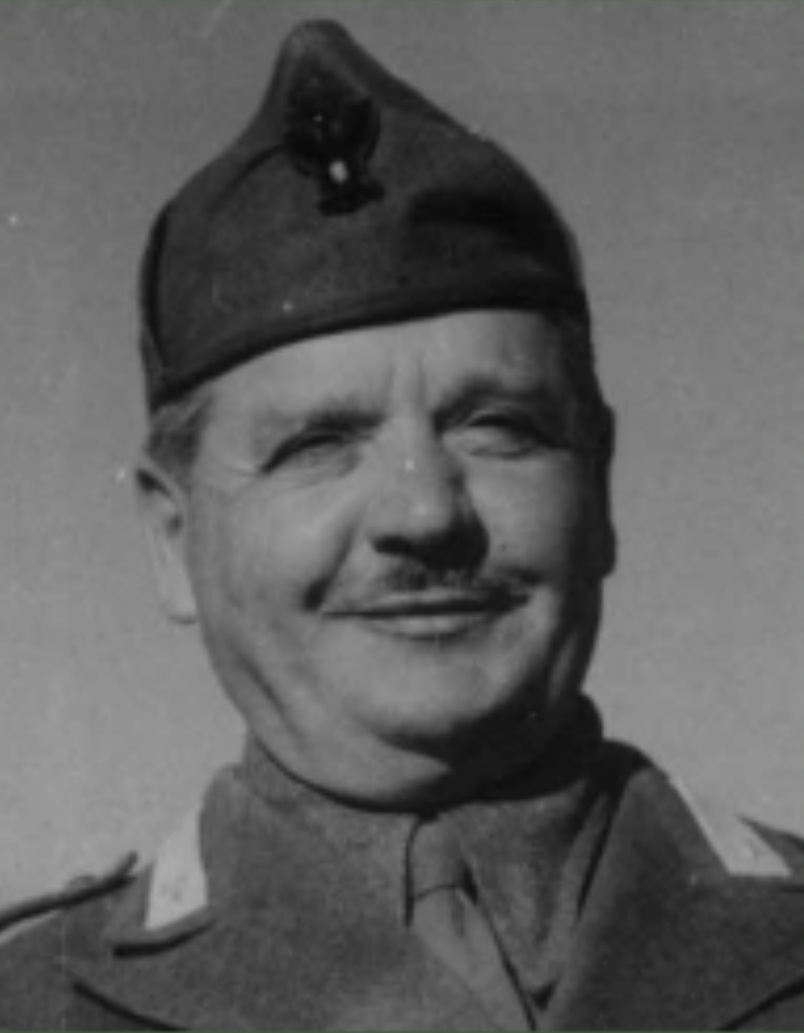
- Born: 1 April 1885; Cesena, Kingdom of Italy
- Died: 22 March 1977 (aged 91); Merano, Italian Republic
- Military career
- Allegiance: Kingdom of Italy; Italian Social Republic (1943–1945)
- Branch: Royal Italian Army (1905–1943); National Republican Army (1943–1945)
- Service years: 1905–1945
- Rank: Generale di corpo d'armata
- Commands: 56th Infantry Division Casale; XXI Army Corps; XIX Army Corps
- Conflicts: Italo-Turkish War; World War I Second Italo-Abyssinian War; World War II

Enea Navarini (1 April 1885 in Cesena – 22 March 1977 in Merano) was an Italian general who served during the Second World War.

== Biography ==
Navarini took part in the Italian invasion of Abyssinia and, from the autumn of 1936, was part of the Southern Group led by Rodolfo Graziani, where he carried out brutal ‘police operations’ against the highly active Ethiopian resistance. The systematic persecution was directed here primarily at Ras Desta Damtew (1892–1937), the military leader of the Ethiopian southern sector.

From 1939 to 1941 Enea Navarini was the general officer commanding the 56th Infantry Division Casale. On 14 March 1941, the division boarded ship for Albania, to participate in the ongoing Greco-Italian War. After the German invasion of Greece, Navarini was transferred to the North African front where he assumed command of the XXI Army Corps.

In Africa, Navarini became one of the most trusted assistants to Erwin Rommel and at some time also appointed as Chief of DELEASE (Detachment of the Italian Supreme Command in North Africa) until his repatriation on 14 October 1942. He returned to North Africa, at Rommel's direct request, for the Second Battle of El Alamein, once again commanding the XXI Corps.

After the defeat of the German-Italian Panzer Army he remained in command of the surviving units until February 1943 when, following the inevitable loss of the North African front in Tunisia, he was evacuated to Italy.

Posted as commanding general of the XIX Army Corps in Campania, following the Armistice of Cassibile Navarini managed to escape and reach Northern Italy, where he joined the forces of the newborn army of the Italian Social Republic (RSI). Since 1944 he became Commander of the RSI Special Forces Training Unit.

After the end of the war, in April 1945, he was subjected to an administrative process of political legal purge ("administrative trial") with the loss of his role and rank, but in the course of the same year such measures were revoked by legal decision of a superior Court of Justice ("judicial trial").

== Sources ==
- "Biography of Lieutenant-General Enea Navarini". Generals.dk.

== Bibliography ==
- The Trail of the Fox (1977), a biography of Erwin Rommel ISBN 0-525-22200-6, reissued 1999 in Wordsworth Military Library, ISBN 1-84022-205-0
- Greene, Jack & Massignani, Alessandro: Rommel's North Africa Campaign: September 1940 – November 1942, Da Capo Press, 2007 ISBN 0-306-81685-7
- Karbe, Ariane; Obermair, Hannes (2026), "»Der äthiopische Mantel«. Unrechtskontexte, Gegennarrative und Restitution", in Hellfritzsch, Ron; Gross, Sören; Mappes, Timo (eds.), Technisches Kulturgut, vol. 3: Gerechte und faire Lösungen? Umgang mit Unrechtskontexten, Dresden: Sandstein Kultur—Stiftung Deutsches Optisches Museum, pp. 231–243, ISBN 978-3-95498-904-1
