= Giuseppe Amico =

Italian general (1890–1943)

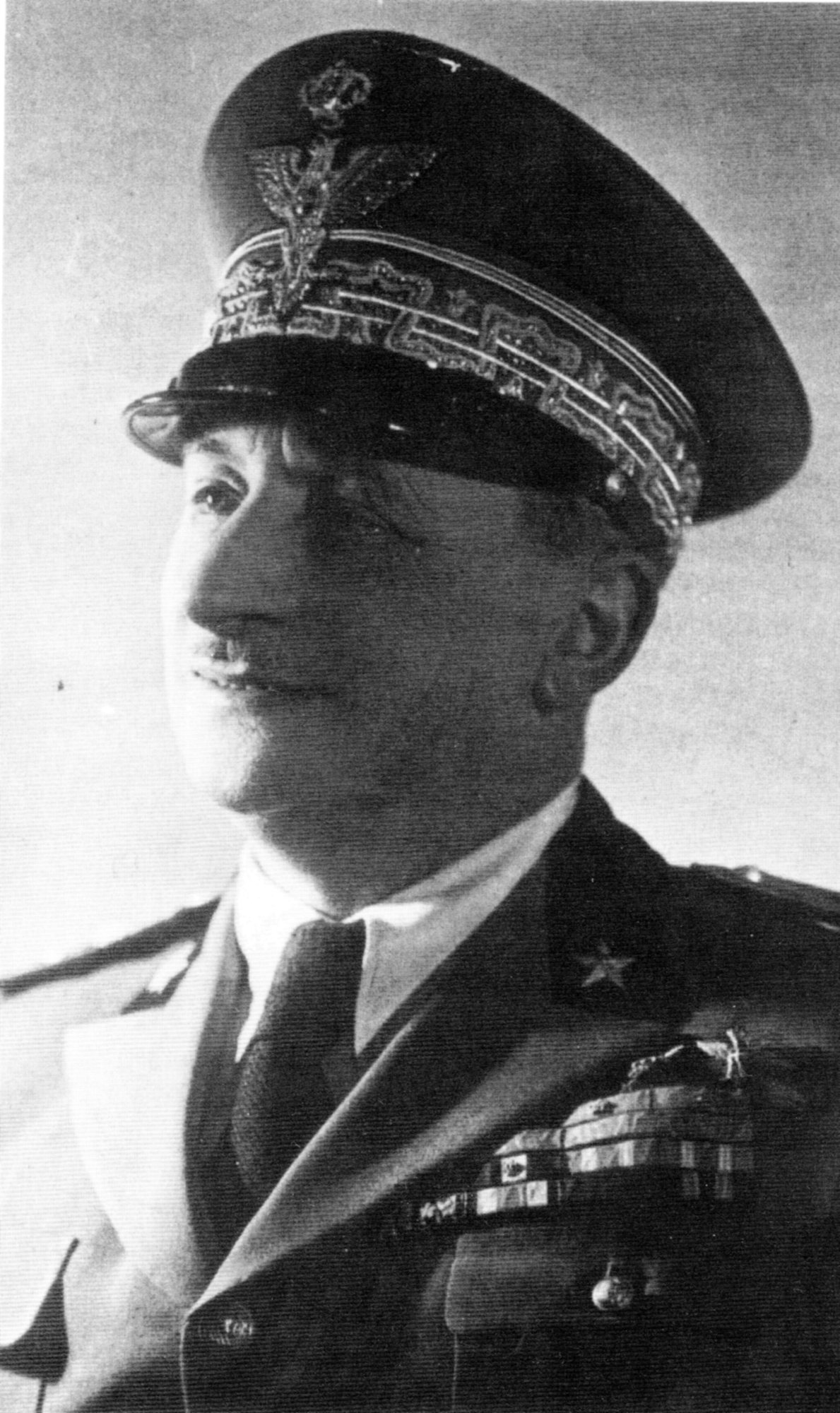
- Born: 1 November 1890; Capua, Kingdom of Italy
- Died: 13 September 1943 (aged 52); Slano, Croatia
- Military career
- Allegiance: Kingdom of Italy
- Branch: Royal Italian Army
- Service years: 1909–1943
- Rank: Major general
- Commands: 10th Divisional Artillery Regiment; 64th Infantry Division Catanzaro; 32nd Infantry Division Marche
- Conflicts: World War I; Battles of the Isonzo; Spanish Civil War; Battle of Guadalajara; Battle of Santander; Battle of the Ebro; Aragon Offensive; Levante Offensive; World War II; North African campaign; Battle of Sidi Barrani; Battle of Bardia; Battle of the Neretva; Operation Achse
- Awards: Gold Medal of Military Valor (posthumous); Silver Medal of Military Valor (twice); Bronze Medal of Military Valor (three times); Military Order of Savoy; Order of the Crown of Italy; Order of Skanderbeg

Giuseppe Amico (1 November 1890 – 13 September 1943) was an Italian general during World War II.

== Biography ==
He was born in Capua on 1 November 1890, the son of Fortunato Amico and Carmela Prestieri, and began his military career in 1909, entering the Military Academy of Artillery and Engineers in Turin. He graduated with the rank of second lieutenant in September 1911, and was assigned to the field artillery. In 1913 he was promoted to lieutenant and assigned to the 13th Field Artillery Regiment, where he was still serving when Italy entered World War I on 24 May 1915. In September of the same year he was promoted to the rank of captain, being transferred to the 31st Field Artillery Regiment. In 1916 he was transferred to the command of the Cavalry Division, and then to that of the VII Army Corps; in May 1916 he was awarded a Bronze Medal of Military Valor for his role in the fighting near Monfalcone, and later he earned a Silver Medal of Military Valor for actions on the Karst Plateau. In July 1918 he was promoted to major.

Between 1920 and 1921 he attended the courses of the War School, where he later became a teacher of Military History. From 1928 to 1931, after promotion to colonel, he was part of the military mission tasked with establishing the borders of Albania. After returning to Italy he was in command of a group of the 5th Field Artillery Regiment "Superga" which he left in 1935, after promotion to colonel, to assume command of the 10th Divisional Artillery Regiment. In 1937 he fought in the Spanish Civil War at the command of the 1st Artillery Regiment of the 4th Infantry Division Littorio, and in 1938 he was given command of the artillery of the Corps of Volunteer Troops. He participated in the battle of Guadalajara, the battle of Santander, the battle of the Ebro, the Aragon Offensive and the Levante Offensive, earning another two bronze medals and one Silver Medal of Military Valor.

He was promoted to brigadier general for war merit and in August 1939 he was appointed chief of staff of the 4th Army and subsequently of the 7th Army after the Kingdom of Italy entered World War II on 10 June 1940. In November of the same year he assumed command of the 64th Infantry Division Catanzaro, stationed in North Africa; between December 1940 and January 1941 the division was annihilated during Operation Compass in the battles of Sidi Barrani and of Bardia, but Amico managed to evade capture by marching on foot for 120 kilometers across the desert until reaching Tobruk, together with a small group of fugitives that included General Annibale Bergonzoli and two Blackshirt colonels.

On 26 June 1941 he was sent to Dalmatia and given command of the 32nd Infantry Division Marche, which had its headquarters in Dubrovnik, and on 1 January 1942 he was promoted to major general. Between 1941 and 1943 he actively opposed the deportations of Jews living in the area controlled by his troops, refusing to hand them over to the Germans and to the Ustasha of Ante Pavelić. Relationships between him, German commanders and the authorities of the Independent State of Croatia deteriorated as a result of this, and he came to be known as a "sworn enemy" of the Nazis and Ustasha. In February 1943 his troops participated in the battle of the Neretva.

Following the proclamation of the armistice of Cassibile on 8 September 1943, Amico held Dubrovnik against the 7th SS Volunteer Mountain Division Prinz Eugen until he was treacherously captured during a parley. He was released on the condition that he would order his men to surrender, but instead stirred them to fight against the Germans; he was recaptured and shot near Slano on 13 September 1943. Many of his men joined the Yugoslav partisans, continuing to fight against the Germans. Amico was posthumously awarded the Gold Medal of Military Valor. His remains were returned to Italy in the 1960s and buried in the Sacrario militare dei Caduti Oltremare in Bari.
