= Lastva =

Coordinates: 42.7014°N 18.4744°E

Lastva Ластва
- Village
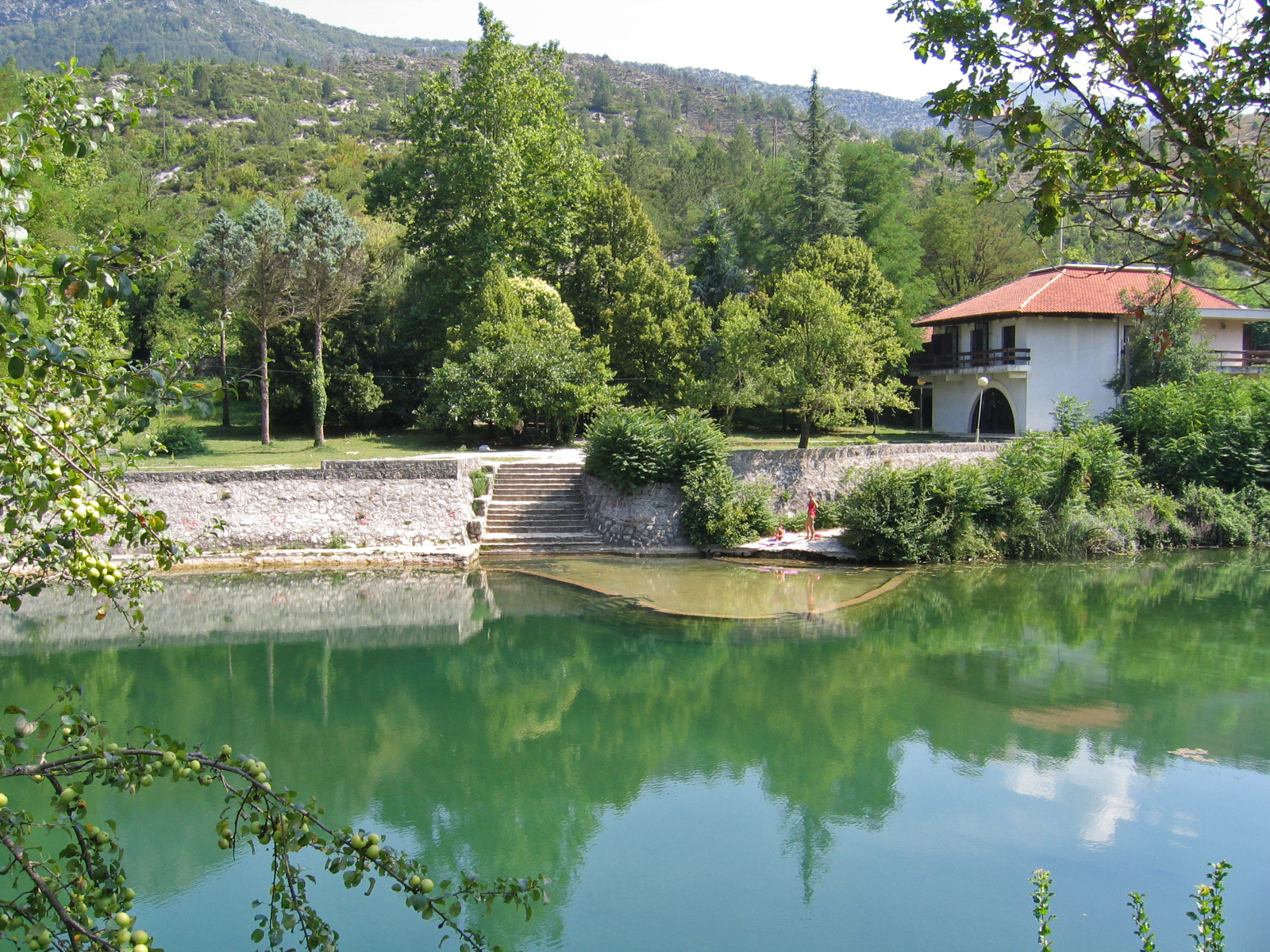
- Beach and motel Jazina in Lastva near Trebinje, Herzegovina

- Location within Republika Srpska
- Country: Bosnia and Herzegovina
- Entity: Republika Srpska
- Municipality: Trebinje
- Time zone: UTC+1 (CET)
  - Summer (DST): UTC+2 (CEST)

Lastva (Serbian Cyrillic: Ластва) is a village in the municipality of Trebinje, Republika Srpska, Bosnia and Herzegovina.
