= 64th Infantry Division "Catanzaro" =

Infantry division of the Royal Italian Army during World War II

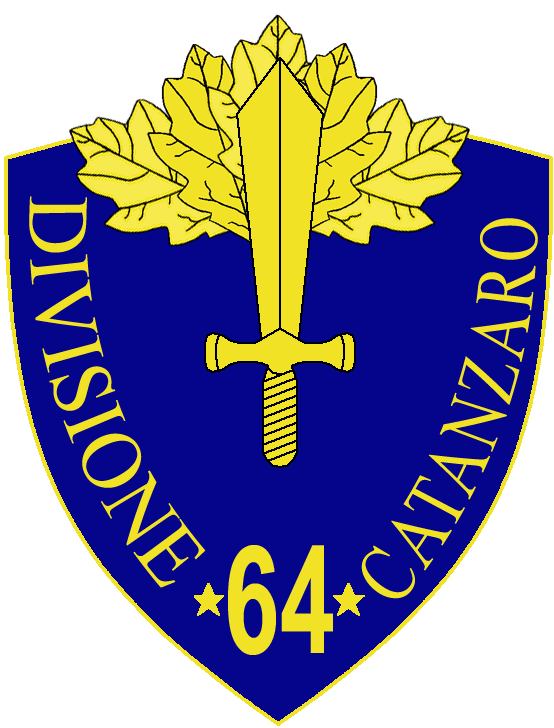
- 64th Infantry Division 'Catanzaro" insignia
- Active: 1940–1941
- Country: Kingdom of Italy
- Branch: Royal Italian Army
- Type: Infantry
- Size: Division
- Engagements: World War II

Commanders
- Notable commanders: Generanl Giuseppe Amico

Insignia
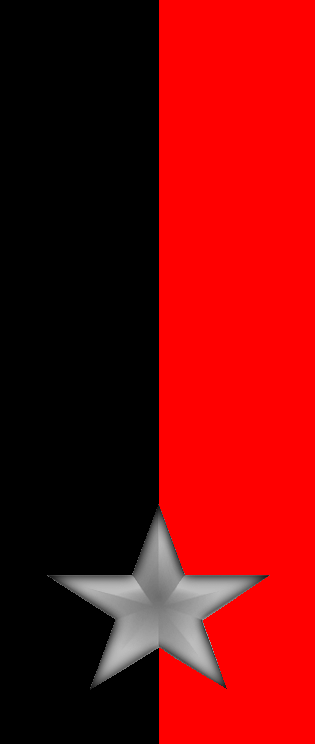
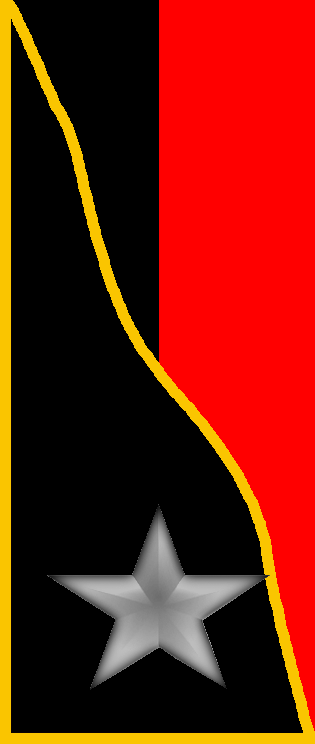
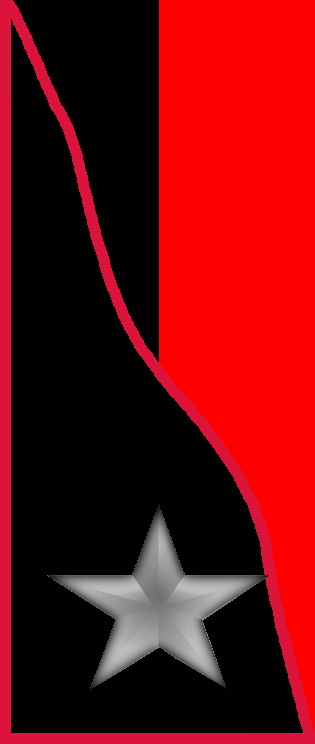
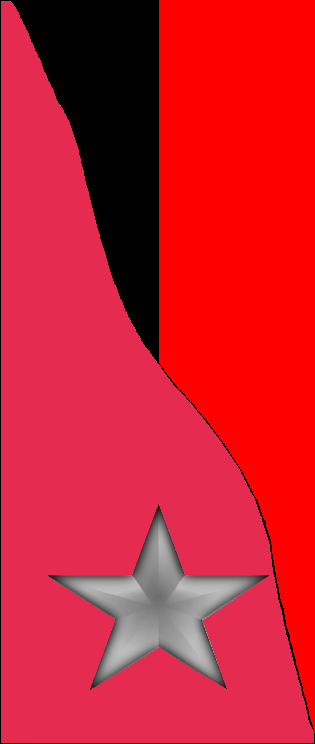
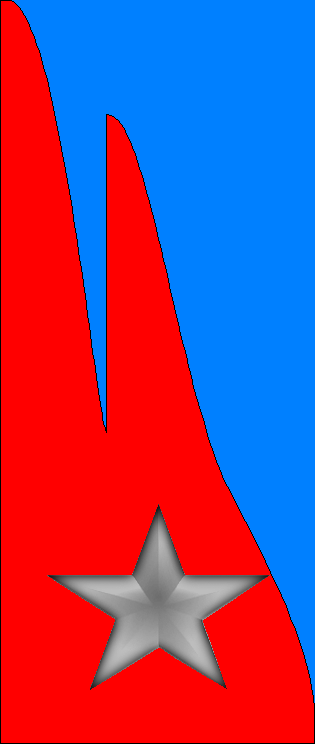
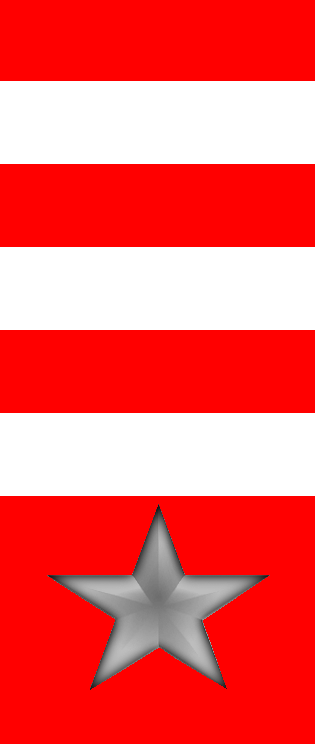
- Identification symbol: Catanzaro Division gorget patches

The 64th Infantry Division "Catanzaro" (Italian: 64ª Divisione di fanteria "Catanzaro") was an infantry division of the Royal Italian Army during World War II. The division was activated on 3 June 1940 and named for the Southern Italian city of Catanzaro. The division's regimental depots were in mainland Italy in Calabria and shared with other divisions recruiting in the region. The division was classified as an auto-transportable division, meaning it had some motorized transport, but not enough to move the entire division at once. The division took part in the Italian invasion of Egypt and was destroyed on 5 January 1941 during the Battle of Bardia.

== History ==
=== World War I ===
The division's lineage begins with the Brigade "Catanzaro" established in preparation for Italy's entry into World War I in Catanzaro on 1 March 1915. The brigade consisted of the 141st and 142nd infantry regiments, which were manned by reservists from Calabria. The brigade fought on the Italian front and its conduct the brigade's 141st Infantry Regiment was awarded Italy's highest military honor, the Gold Medal of Military Valor. After the war the brigade and its two regiments were disbanded in June 1920.

On 3 June 1940 the 64th Infantry Division "Catanzaro" was activated in Acroma in Libya with its two traditional infantry regiments and the 203rd Artillery Regiment. The latter regiment had been part of the disbanded 3rd CC.NN. Division "21 Aprile", whose minor Royal Italian Army units and equipment were also transferred to the Catanzaro.

Due to the urgent need to reinforce Libya the two infantry regiments of the division had been formed by six different infantry regiments in mainland Italy:

- 141st Infantry Regiment "Catanzaro" - raised on 23 May 1940
  - Regimental Command - raised in Modena by the regimental depot of the 36th Infantry Regiment "Pistoia"/ 16th Infantry Division "Pistoia"
  - I Battalion - raised in Brescia by the regimental depot of the 77th Infantry Regiment "Lupi di Toscana"/ 7th Infantry Division "Lupi di Toscana"
  - II Battalion - raised in Modena by the regimental depot of the 36th Infantry Regiment "Pistoia"/ 16th Infantry Division "Pistoia"
  - III Battalion - raised in Mantua by the regimental depot of the 80th Infantry Regiment "Pasubio"/ 9th Infantry Division "Pasubio"
- 142nd Infantry Regiment "Catanzaro" - raised on 23 May 1940
  - Regimental Command - raised in Catania by the regimental depot of the 4th Infantry Regiment "Piemonte"/ 29th Infantry Division "Piemonte"
  - I Battalion - raised in Perugia by the regimental depot of the 51st Infantry Regiment "Alpi"/ 22nd Infantry Division "Cacciatori delle Alpi"
  - II Battalion - raised in Bari by the regimental depot of the 48th Infantry Regiment "Ferrara"/ 23rd Infantry Division "Ferrara"
  - III Battalion - raised in Catania by the regimental depot of the 4th Infantry Regiment "Piemonte"/ 29th Infantry Division "Piemonte"

The 141st Infantry Regiment landed in Derna in Libya on 3 June 1940, while the 142nd Infantry Regiment landed in Tobruk on 6 June 1940. The division entered World War II with the following major units:

- 64th Infantry Division "Catanzaro", in Acroma
  - 141st Infantry Regiment "Catanzaro", in Benghazi
  - 142nd Infantry Regiment "Catanzaro", in Marj
  - 203rd Artillery Regiment "Catanzaro", in Acroma

=== World War II ===
Western Desert 1940

After Italy's entry into the war on 10 June 1940 the Catanzaro was deployed at Acroma to guard the approach to Tobruk. On 9 September 1940 the Italian invasion of Egypt commenced and on 13 September the Catanzaro followed the bulk of the 10th Army's into British Egypt. After the capture of Sidi Barrani on 16 September, the 10th Army formed a defensive line composed of big outposts separated by wide desert areas and the Catanzaro moved to Sidi Barrani to guard the coastal railroad, the 10th Army's vital supply line.

On the nights of 7 December and 8 December 1940 the British Western Desert Force under of Major-General Richard O'Connor and comprising the British 7th Armoured Division and Indian 4th Infantry Division, reinforced by the British 16th Infantry Brigade advanced 70 miles (110 km) to their starting positions for Operation Compass. At the time the Catanzaro was defending the Buqbuq sector, between the 63rd Infantry Division "Cirene" at Ābār Abū Safāfī (Sofafi) to the South, and the 1st Libyan Division at Al Maktīlah (Maktila) and 2nd Libyan Division at ‘Alam aţ Ţummār (Tummar) to the North. The heavy bombardment and British armored attack at ’Alam Rimth on 9 December 1940 penetrated the Catanzaro's defenses. The annihilation of the Maletti Group at ‘Alam Nibeiwa on the same day aggravated the situation. Unable to resist or stop the attacks, the Catanzaro linked up with other Italian units at Buqbuq and covered the retreat of the 4th CC.NN. Division "3 Gennaio" and the Headquarters of the "Libyan Corps" from Sidi Barrani along the coastal railroad on 10 December 1940. By 11 December Buqbuq had been cleared of all Italian troops, many of whom had been captured. The remnants of the division were able to make a stand at Bir Tishdida, at the eastern outskirts of Sallum, and contained the British advance, at the cost of the majority of the remaining Italian tanks. On 13–14 December 1940, the Catanzaro under relentless British pressure retreated to Sallum proper, and on 15 December 1940 fell back to the defensive perimeter of Bardia. What remained of the division was completely destroyed in the Battle of Bardia by 5 January 1941.

== Organization ==
64th Infantry Division "Catanzaro" organization in 1940

- 64th Infantry Division "Catanzaro"
  - Headquarters
    - Command Company
    - 705th Carabinieri Section
    - 706th Carabinieri Section
    - 303rd Field Post Office
    - 64th Infantry Division Command Transport Squad
  - 141st Infantry Regiment "Catanzaro"
    - Command Company
    - 3 × Fusilier battalions
    - Support Weapons Battery (65/17 mod. 13 infantry support guns)
    - Mortar Company (81mm mod. 35 mortars)
  - 142nd Infantry Regiment "Catanzaro"
    - Command Company
    - 3 × Fusilier battalions
    - Support Weapons Battery (65/17 mod. 13 infantry support guns)
    - Mortar Company (81mm mod. 35 mortars)
  - 203rd Artillery Regiment "Catanzaro"
    - Command Unit
    - I Group (75/27 mod. 06 field guns)
    - II Group (75/27 mod. 06 field guns)
    - III Group (100/17 mod. 14 howitzers)
    - 3rd Anti-aircraft Battery (20/65 mod. 35 anti-aircraft guns)
    - 203rd Anti-aircraft Battery (20/65 mod. 35 anti-aircraft guns)
    - Ammunition and Supply Unit
  - XX Tank Battalion L (L3/35 tankettes; attached during the Italian invasion of Egypt)
  - LXIII Tank Battalion L (L3/35 tankettes; transferred from 63rd Infantry Division "Cirene" on 9 December 1940)
  - LXIV Machine Gun Battalion (former CCIII Machine Gun Battalion)
  - LXIV Mixed Engineer Battalion (former CCIII Mixed Engineer Battalion)
    - 64th Telegraph and Radio Operators Company
    - 1 × Engineer Company
    - 1 × Searchlight Section
  - LXIV Replacements Battalion
  - 64th Anti-tank Company (47/32 mod. 35 anti-tank guns; former 203rd Anti-tank Company)
  - 203rd Medical Section
    - 2 × Field hospitals
    - 1 × Surgical unit
  - 203rd Supply Section
  - 203rd Transport Section

== Commanding officers ==
The division's commanding officers were:

- Generale di Brigata Giuseppe Stefanelli (3–20 June 1940)
- Generale di Brigata Lorenzo Mugnai (21 June – 5 December 1940)
- Generale di Brigata Giuseppe Amico (6 December 1940 – 5 January 1941)

== Bibliography ==
- Paoletti, Ciro (2008). A Military History of Italy. Greenwood. ISBN 978-0-275-98505-9.
