= 222nd Coastal Division =

Royal Italian Army infantry division during World War II

- Active: 1942 – 1943
- Country: Kingdom of Italy
- Branch: Royal Italian Army
- Size: Division
- Garrison/HQ: Buccoli
- Engagements: World War II

Insignia
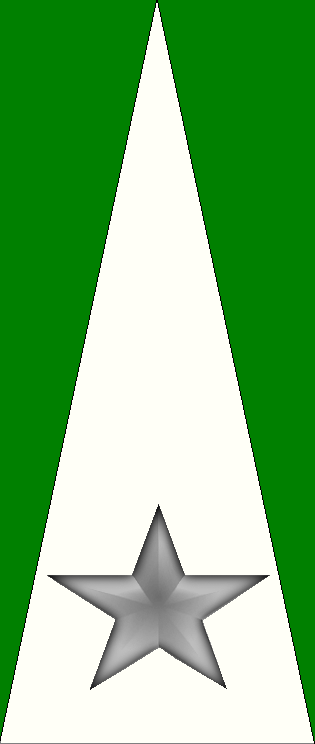
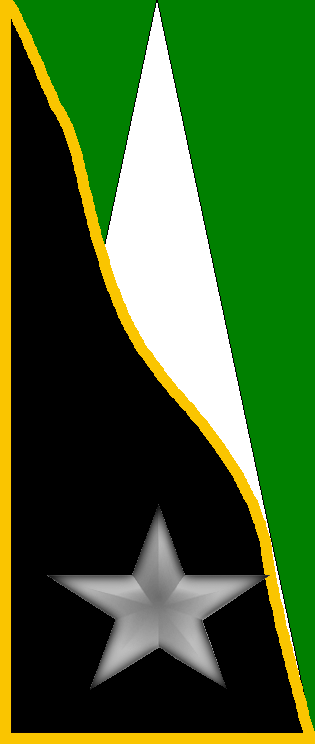
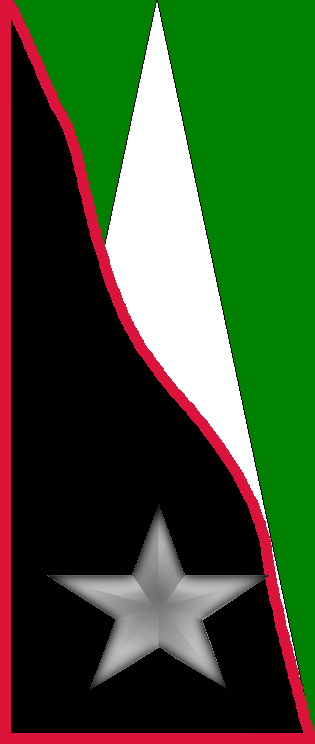
- Identification symbol: 222nd Coastal Division gorget patches

The 222nd Coastal Division (Italian: 222ª Divisione Costiera) was an infantry division of the Royal Italian Army during World War II. Royal Italian Army coastal divisions were second line divisions formed with reservists and equipped with second rate materiel. They were often commanded by officers called out of retirement.

== History ==
The division was activated on 15 April 1942 in Naples by uniting the two coastal defense sectors "Salerno" and "Sapri". From April to December 1942 the division was assigned to XXX Army Corps, which then moved to Tunisia and was destroyed in the Tunisian Campaign. For the rest of its existence the division was assigned to XIX Army Corps. The division had its headquarter in Buccoli a subdivision of Battipaglia and was responsible for the coastal defense of the coast of southern Campania between the lighthouse of Capo d'Orso in Maiori and the mouth of the river Noce at Castrocucco. The division's area included the Gulf of Salerno, where on 9 September 1943 the British-American US Fifth Army landed. The Harbor Defense Command Naples, which had responsibility for the coastal defense of the Gulf of Naples was attached to the division from 1943.

After the announcement of the Armistice of Cassibile in the evening of 8 September 1943 German forces ambushed the division's commander General Ferrante Vincenzo Gonzaga and his staff and demanded he order his troops to disarm and that he surrender his gun. Gonzaga, who had already issued orders to his units to refuse German requests to hand over their weapons, and to regroup and prepare to fight the Germans, refused to comply. After having refused the German demands Gonzaga was shot dead by the Germans, who then proceeded to disarm and disband his division in Operation Achse. The next morning Allied troops landed at Salerno and the remnants of the division dissolved quickly and left the area.

After the war General Gonzaga was awarded Italy's highest military decoration the Gold Medal of Military Valor for his courage.

== Organization ==
- 222nd Coastal Division, in Buccoli
  - 17th Coastal Regiment
    - 3 × Coastal battalions
  - 18th Coastal Regiment
    - 3 × Coastal battalions
  - CXCVIII Coastal Artillery Group
  - CIC Coastal Artillery Group
  - 2 × Machine gun companies
  - 222nd Carabinieri Section
  - 184th Field Post Office
  - Division Services

Attached to the division:

- Harbor Defense Command Naples:
  - 117th Coastal Regiment
    - 3 × Coastal battalions
  - 151st Coastal Regiment
    - 3 × Coastal battalions
  - 14th Guardia alla Frontiera Artillery Regiment

== Commanding officers ==
The division's commanding officers were:

- Generale di Brigata Adolfo Antoniazzi (15 April 1942 - 9 February 1943)
- Generale di Brigata Ferrante Vincenzo Gonzaga (10 February 1943 - 8 September 1943, KIA)
