= Maurizio Ferrante Gonzaga =

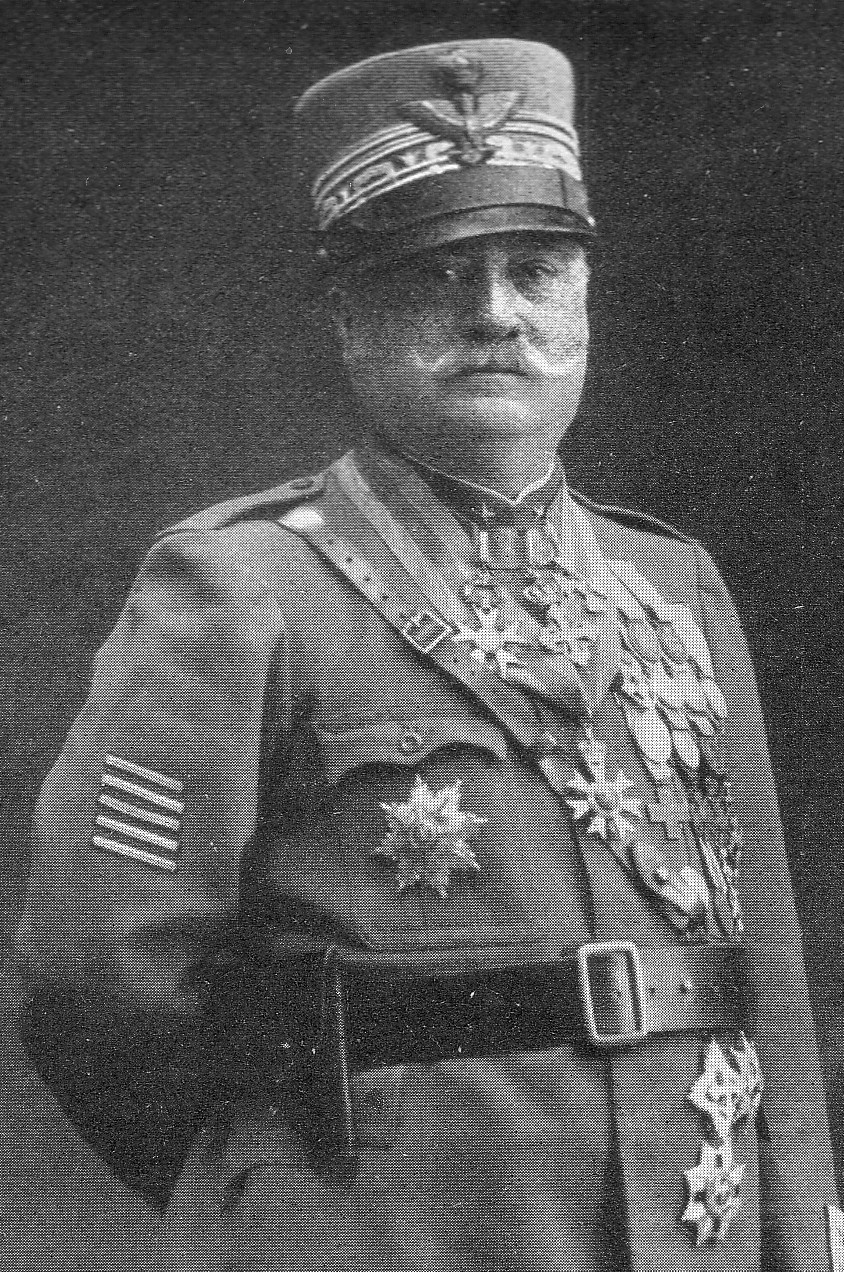

Marquis of Vescovato
- Predecessor: Antonio Francesco Gonzaga
- Successor: Ferrante Vincenzo Gonzaga
- Born: 21 September 1861; Venice, Austrian Empire
- Died: 24 March 1938 (aged 76); Turin, Kingdom of Italy
- Issue: Ferrante Vincenzo Gonzaga; Maria Giuseppina
Names
- Maurizio Ferrante Gonzaga
- House: House of Gonzaga
- Father: Antonio Francesco Gonzaga
- Mother: Giuseppina Domenica Priamo

Maurizio Ferrante Gonzaga (Venice, 21 September 1861 – Rome, 24 March 1938) was an Italian general from the House of Gonzaga, decorated with the rank of officer in the Military Order of Savoy, with two gold medals, three silver and two bronze medals to military valor and the cross to the merit of war. He was a prince of the Holy Roman Empire, marquis of Vescovato, marquis of Vodice, count of Villanova and Cassolnovo (from 1932), and Venetian patrician. He was also a senator of the Kingdom of Italy.

== Biography ==
Maurizio Ferrante Gonzaga was born in Venice, Kingdom of Lombardy–Venetia on 21 September 1861, son of Prince Antonio Gonzaga and Giuseppina Domenica Priamo. He started to study in the military school in Modena in 1879. He took an oath of allegiance to the Kingdom of Italy in Alba in 1881 as a second lieutenant. Gonzaga was appointed captain in 1889 and ten years later major. He was promoted to lieutenant colonel and chief of staff of the military division of Livorno in 1906.

He was sent in 1909 to the command of the fourth army corps stationed in Genoa under the orders of General Luigi Cadorna and participated in the Italian-Turkish war in Tripolitania and Cyrenaica in 1913, being appointed colonel and commander of the mixed infantry regiment based in Tobruk. He was then promoted to major general and appointed as deputy governor of Cyrenaica.

Returning to Italy as the head of the second corps during the First World War he organized the troops for the front under command of the general Pietro Frugoni. On 24 October 1915, he was given command of the 9th Infantry Division (brigades Puglia and Rome). He fought in the Battle of Podgora and Tonezza. He halted the enemy's march in the Astico Valley and on the Isonzo and conquered Mount Cimone in July 1916.

He was assigned the 53rd division formed with the unification of the two brigades, Teramo and Girgenti in January 1917. After the necessary training period, he fought on Mount Vodice, an Austrian stronghold garrisoned and supplied with galleries and trenches, obtaining the first gold medal for military valor, granted to him in the field by King Vittorio Emanuele III.

He participated in the battle of Caporetto on 24 October 1917, blocking the enemy advance on the Natisone, but was seriously injured in one knee and in the right hand by the explosion of a grenade, losing three fingers. He was then transferred to the military hospital in Udine where his wife joined him and took him back to Genoa, avoiding the capture by the Austrians, who entered Udine on the morning of 28 October. In Genoa, he was admitted to the Mackenzie hospital until August 1918. In the meantime, he had been awarded the second gold medal on behalf of the king.

=== Postwar ===
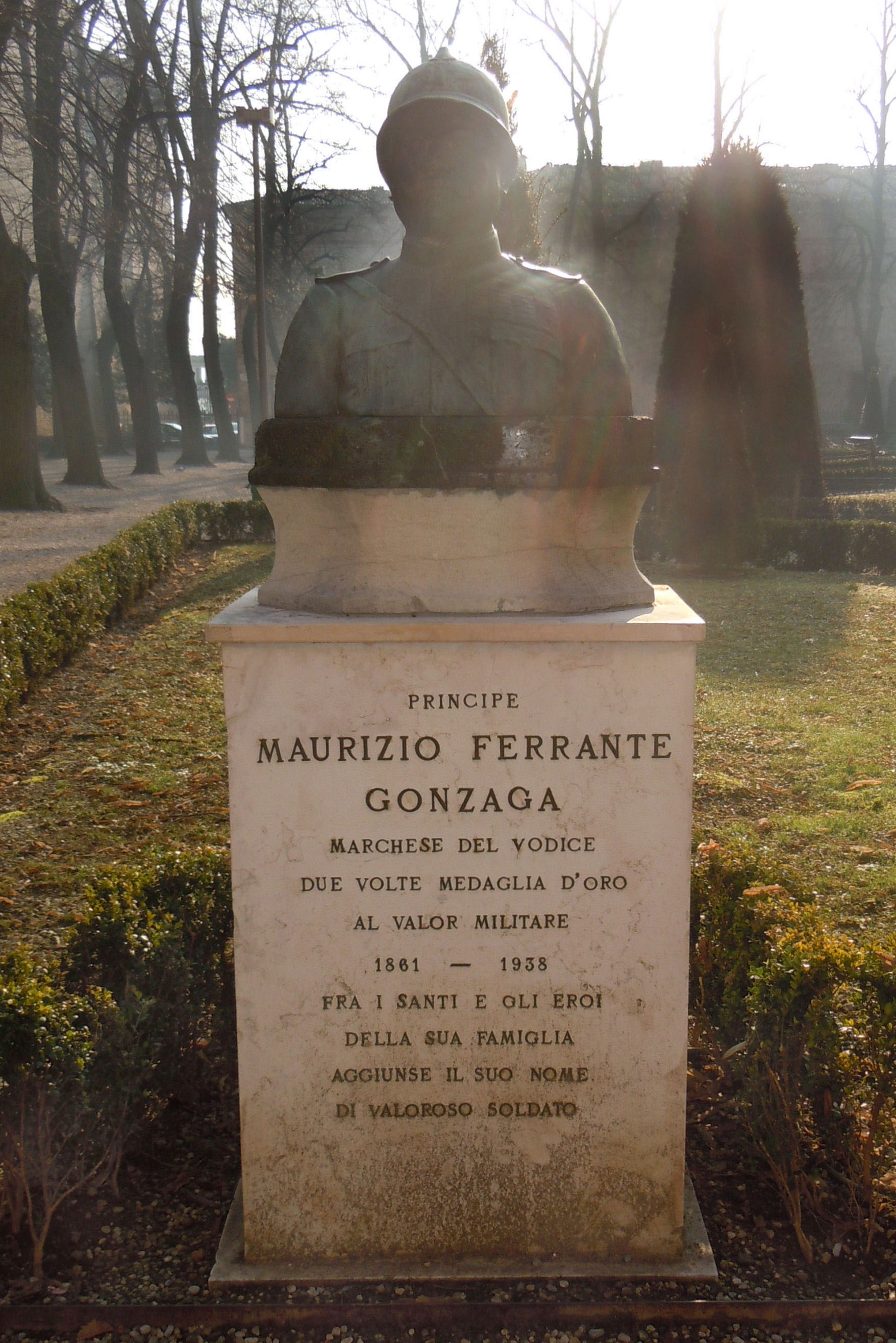
Funerary monument of Maurizio Ferrante Gonzaga

He was appointed the commander of the territorial military division of Genoa in February 1919. He was then promoted to commander of the army corps in April 1922 with headquarters in Florence and appointed senator of the Kingdom of Italy.

In Florence, he committed himself to building a monument in honor of the "Italian mother" which was completed in 1926 and placed in a chapel of the church of Santa Croce.

On 7 September 1925 Benito Mussolini appointed him the supreme commander of the Voluntary Militia for National Security (MVSN). After a little over a year, he retired upon reaching the age limit, but after a month, in consideration of his merits, he was recalled into service by the King who assigned him an office in the Ministry of War.

In Rome, he reorganized the writings of his archive and furnished his apartment in Prati. In 1932 he has created Marquis of Vodice with Royal Decree of 12/29/1932 and the recognition of the qualification of "Serene Highness".

He died in his Roman house on March 24, 1938. In 1941 the government had a mausoleum built on Vodice, now in Slovenia but due to the Second World War it could not be buried there. He rests in a monument in the "gold medal box" of the Verano cemetery in Rome, together with his son Ferrante Vincenzo Gonzaga, also a gold medal recipient in the Second World War.

=== Family ===
At twenty-two he married Angiolina Alliana of Alba (Cuneo), with whom he had two children:

- Maria Giuseppina, born in Alba in 1884 and died in Rome in 1974;
- Ferrante Vincenzo, 14th marquis of Vescovato.

== Honors ==
=== Italian honors ===
| Ribbon | Award | Date awarded |
|---|---|---|
| | Grand Officer of Order of Saints Maurice and Lazarus | 27 July 1922 |
| | Grand Officer of Order of the Crown of Italy | 10 June 1920 |
| | Commander of Colonial Order of the Star of Italy | |
| | Officer of Military Order of Savoy | October 1915 – August 1917 |
| | Gold Medal of Military Valour | May 1917 |
| | Gold Medal of Military Valour | 25 October 1917 |
| | Silver Medal of Military Valor | July 1916 |
| | Silver Medal of Military Valor | August 1917 |
| | Silver Medal of Military Valor | November 1918 |
| | Bronze Medal of Military Valor | |
| | Bronze Medal of Military Valor | |
| | War Merit Cross | |
| | Cross for military service seniority | |
| | Commemorative Medal for the Italo-Turkish War 1911-1912 | |
| | Commemorative Medal for the Italo-Austrian War 1915–1918 | |
| | Allied Victory Medal | |
| | Commemorative Medal of the Unity of Italy | |

=== Foreign honors ===
| Ribbon | Award | Country | Date awarded |
|---|---|---|---|
| | Commander of the Legion of Honour | France | |
| | Commander of the Order of St Michael and St George | United Kingdom | |
| | Commander of the Order of the British Empire | United Kingdom | |
| | Grand Cross of the Order of Saint-Charles | Monaco | 1 April 1924 |

== Titles ==
Maurizio Ferrante Gonzaga's titles were Prince of the Holy Roman Empire, Marquis of Vodice, Count of Villanova, Count of Cassolnovo and Patritian of Venice.
