= Ettore Deltetto =

Italian general (1889–1945)

- Born: 21 April 1889; Turin, Kingdom of Italy
- Died: 18 April 1945 (aged 55); Procida, Kingdom of Italy
- Military career
- Allegiance: Kingdom of Italy
- Branch: Royal Italian Army
- Service years: 1908–1943
- Rank: Major general
- Commands: 55th Bersaglieri Battalion; Military District of Mondovì; 44th Infantry Regiment "Forlì"; Territorial Defense of Naples
- Conflicts: Italo-Turkish War; World War I; World War II; Operation Achse
- Awards: Silver Medal of Military Valor; Bronze Medal of Military Valor; Order of Saints Maurice and Lazarus

Ettore Deltetto, also known as Ettore Del Tetto (21 April 1889 – 18 April 1945) was an Italian general during World War II.

== Biography ==
After attending the Military Academy of Modena 1908 to 1911, he was assigned as a second lieutenant to the 9th Bersaglieri Regiment, fighting in Libya during the Italo-Turkish War of 1911–1912, being seriously wounded in action and earning a Silver and a Bronze Medal of Military Valor. At the outbreak of the First World War, with the rank of lieutenant, he was assigned to the 3rd Bersaglieri Battalion; by the end of the war he rose to the rank of major, in command of the 55th Bersaglieri Battalion.

After a period as a teacher at the Army War School of Turin, on 10 October 1925 he was assigned to the staff of the military division of Alessandria. On 1 December 1926 he was promoted to lieutenant colonel, being then given command of the military district of Mondovì, which he held until 19 May 1927. On 22 May 1935 he was promoted to colonel and on 10 June 1937 he was given command of the 44th Infantry Regiment "Forlì". On 3 June 1938 he was knighted with the Order of Saints Maurice and Lazarus.

On 1 January 1941 he was promoted to brigadier general and assigned to the territorial defense of Bolzano, and later transferred to the headquarters of the I Army Corps in Turin for special assignments. In 1942 he was appointed commander of territorial defense of Naples, a post he retained after promotion to major general on 28 March 1943 and still held at the time of the proclamation of the Armistice of Cassibile, on 8 September 1943.

His forces consisted of 9,000 men – largely poorly trained and equipped territorial troops – but he did not attempt any resistance to the German takeover. He instead forbade public gatherings "in order to avoid incidents with the Germans", threatening to have the Army fire on the crowds, ordered subordinated commands to "buy time and avoid angering the Germans", ordered the release of German soldiers who had been captured by Italian units that had engaged them on the initiative of their commanders (even returning them their weapons), and finally fled the city in civilian clothes along with his superior, General Riccardo Pentimalli, commander of the XIX Army Corps.

The two generals were later put under trial for collaborationism and dereliction of duty for their failure to defend Naples. Deltetto, who claimed in his defense that he did not have enough men, that he had not been forewarned of the armistice and that he had not received any orders from Rome, was acquitted of the accusation of collaborationism, but sentenced to twenty years' imprisonment for "abandonment of command" on 24 December 1944. The High Court of Justice, while admitting "the overwhelming superiority of the German forces", stated that defenders could have done "something more and better". The sentence was overturned by the Court of Cassation on 27 December 1946, stating that "the basic elements that guarantee the proper conduct of a trial" had not been observed by the High Court. Deltetto, however, had meanwhile died in prison in Procida on 18 April 1945, from gastrointestinal perforation. He was 55.
