= Ferrante Vincenzo Gonzaga =

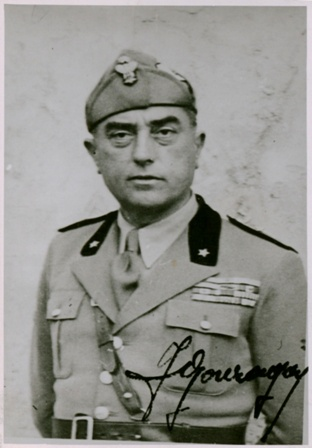

Marquis of Vescovato
- Predecessor: Maurizio Ferrante Gonzaga
- Successor: Maurizio Gonzaga
- Born: 6 March 1889; Turin, Kingdom of Italy
- Died: 8 September 1943 (aged 54); Eboli, Kingdom of Italy
- Spouse: Luisa Anguissola-Scotti
- Issue: Maurizio Gonzaga
Names
- Ferrante Vincenzo Gonzaga
- House: House of Gonzaga
- Father: Maurizio Ferrante Gonzaga
- Mother: Ferdinanda Gonzaga nee Alliana
- Military career
- Allegiance: Kingdom of Italy
- Branch: Royal Italian Army
- Rank: Brigadier general
- Commands: 1st Artillery Regiment "Cacciatori delle Alpi"; 222nd Coastal Division
- Conflicts: Italo-Turkish War; World War I; World War II; Operation Achse
- Awards: Gold Medal of Military Valor (posthumous); Silver Medal of Military Valor; Bronze Medal of Military Valor (twice); War Merit Cross

Ferrante Vincenzo Gonzaga, Marquess of Vescovato (6 March 1889 – 8 September 1943) was an Italian general during World War II.

== Biography ==
=== Early life and career ===
Prince Ferrante Vincenzo Gonzaga was born in 1889, the only son of Prince Maurizio Ferrante Gonzaga, Marquess of Vescovato, general in the Royal Italian Army during the First World War and awarded the victory title of Marquis of the Vodice in 1932. At the death of his father in 1938, Gonzaga inherited the titles of Prince of the Holy Roman Empire, Marquess of Vescovato, marquess of the Vodice, count of Villanova and Cassolnovo, lord of Vescovato and Venetian patrician.

After graduating in engineering at the University of Turin, Gonzaga decided to pursue a military career; he participated as a junior officer in the Italo-Turkish War, fighting in Libya, and in the First World War. In 1926 he was assigned to the Command of the Rome Army Corps. In 1936, with the rank of colonel, he commanded the 1st Artillery Regiment "Cacciatori delle Alpi" in Foligno; from December 1938 to June 1940 he was chief of staff of the 33rd Infantry Division Acqui. After Italy's entry into the Second World War he commanded the artillery of the XIII Army Corps in Cagliari, being promoted to brigadier general on 1 July 1940. In March 1942 he was given command of the artillery of the XXV Army Corps in Elbasan, Albania, until November, after which he was attached to the Ministry of War for a few months. On 10 February 1943, he was given command of the 222nd Coastal Division, stationed in the Salerno area, a severely understaffed unit whose personnel largely consisted of ill-trained and ill-equipped territorial troops.

=== Death ===
After the Armistice of Cassibile was announced on 8 September 1943, German forces launched Operation Achse for the occupation of Italy and the disarmament of all Italian units. General Gonzaga, who had been preparing for such an instance, immediately issued orders to his subordinates instructing them to refuse German requests to hand over their weapons, and to regroup and prepare for resistance. On the same day of the proclamation of the Armistice General Gonzaga was approached in Buccoli, a hamlet of Eboli, by a German detachment commanded by Major von Alvensleben, who ordered him to surrender. Gonzaga refused to comply, shouting to his men: "A Gonzaga never surrenders"; having drawn his gun, he was immediately killed with a burst of submachine gun. Major von Alvensleben expressed admiration for Gonzaga's courage; the general was posthumously awarded the Gold Medal of Military Valor, Italy's highest military decoration.

== Family ==
On 20 October 1937, Ferrante Vincenzo Gonzaga married in Piacenza Luisa Anguissola-Scotti (1903–2008), daughter of Ranuzio Anguissola-Scotti, count of Podenzano and Ville. The couple had three children:

- Maurizio Ferrante, 15th marquis of Vescovato, 3rd marquis of Vodice, count of Villanova, count of Cassolnovo and patrician of Venice (born in Rome on 4 September 1938)
- Corrado Alessandro (born in Rome on 10 July 1941), lord of Vescovato and patrician of Venice
- Isabella (born in Rome on 15 November 1942), married Hans Otto Heidkamp

== Honours ==
Ribbon	Award	Date awarded
	Gold Medal of Military Valour	8 September 1943
	Silver Medal of Military Valor	31 October 1917
	Silver Medal of Marine Valor	2 August 1926
	Bronze Medal of Military Valor	September 1915
	Bronze Medal of Military Valor	November 1918
	War Merit Cross	
	Commemorative Medal for the Italo-Turkish War 1911-1912	
	Commemorative Medal for the Italo-Austrian War 1915–1918	
	Allied Victory Medal	
	Commemorative Medal of the Unity of Italy	
