= Commemorative Medal of the Unity of Italy =

Italian military award

The Italian Risorgimento was celebrated by a series of medals set up by the three kings who ruled during the long process of unification – the Commemorative Medal for the Campaigns of the War of Independence and the various versions of the Commemorative Medal of the Unity of Italy, which were granted by the Kingdom of Italy to those who had taken part in the military operations which had led to Italian independence and later to all who participated in the First World War, since at that time it was traditionally held that Italy completed its unification with the annexation of the Trentino. Its final awards were to participants in the March on Rome and the Impresa di Fiume.

== Vittorio Emanuele II of Savoy ==
Commemorative medal for the campaigns of the Wars of Independence
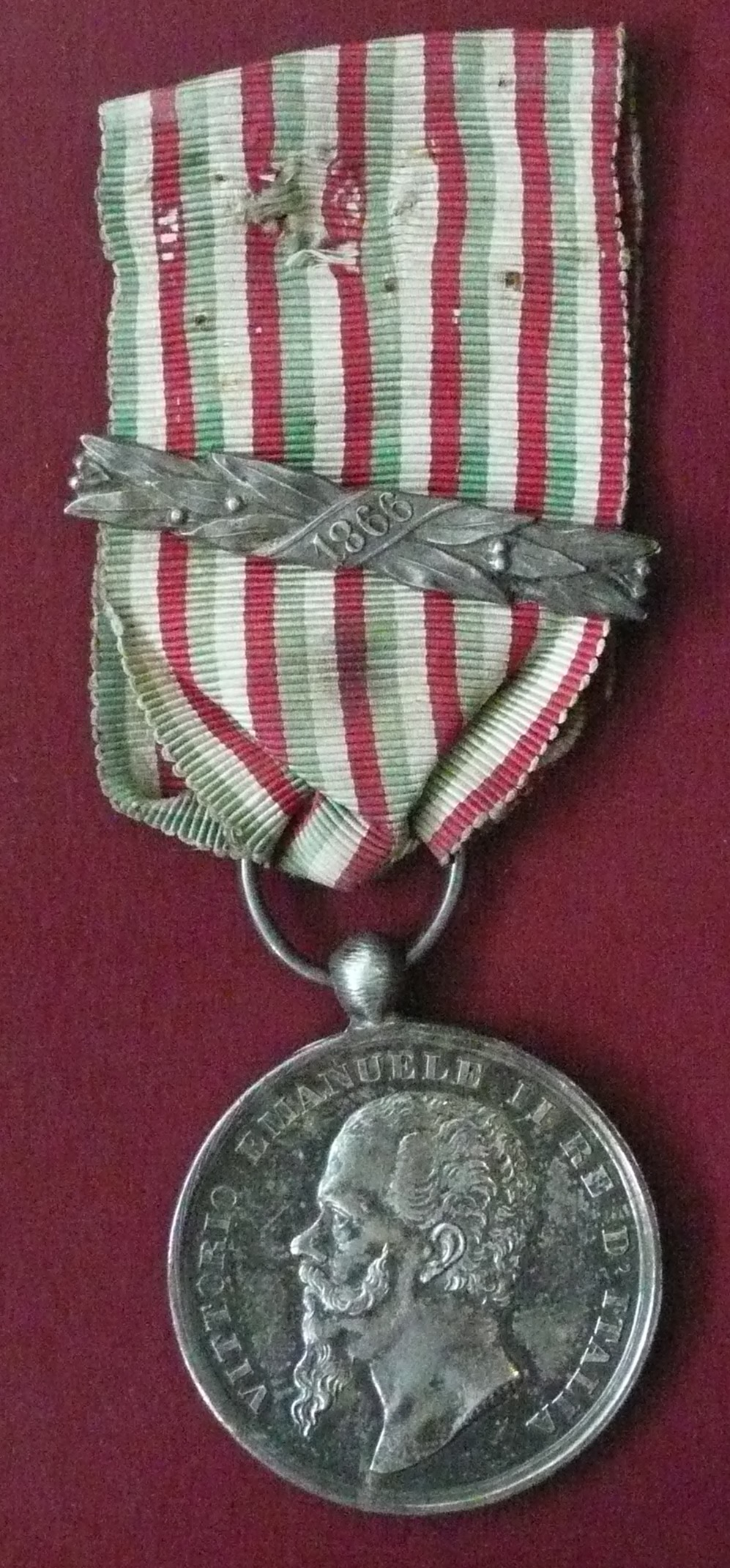
- The obverse and reverse (below) of the medal
- Type: Commemorative medal
- Awarded for: participation in the 1st, 2nd, 3rd Italian Wars of Independence, the Battle of Mentana, the Capture of Rome, or the Crimean War
- Presented by: the Kingdom of Italy
- Eligibility: Italian soldiers and officers
- Campaign: Unification of Italy
- Clasps: 1848, 1849, 1855–56, 1859, 1860–61, 1866, 1867, 1870
- Status: Discontinued on 26 April 1883
- Established: 4 March 1865
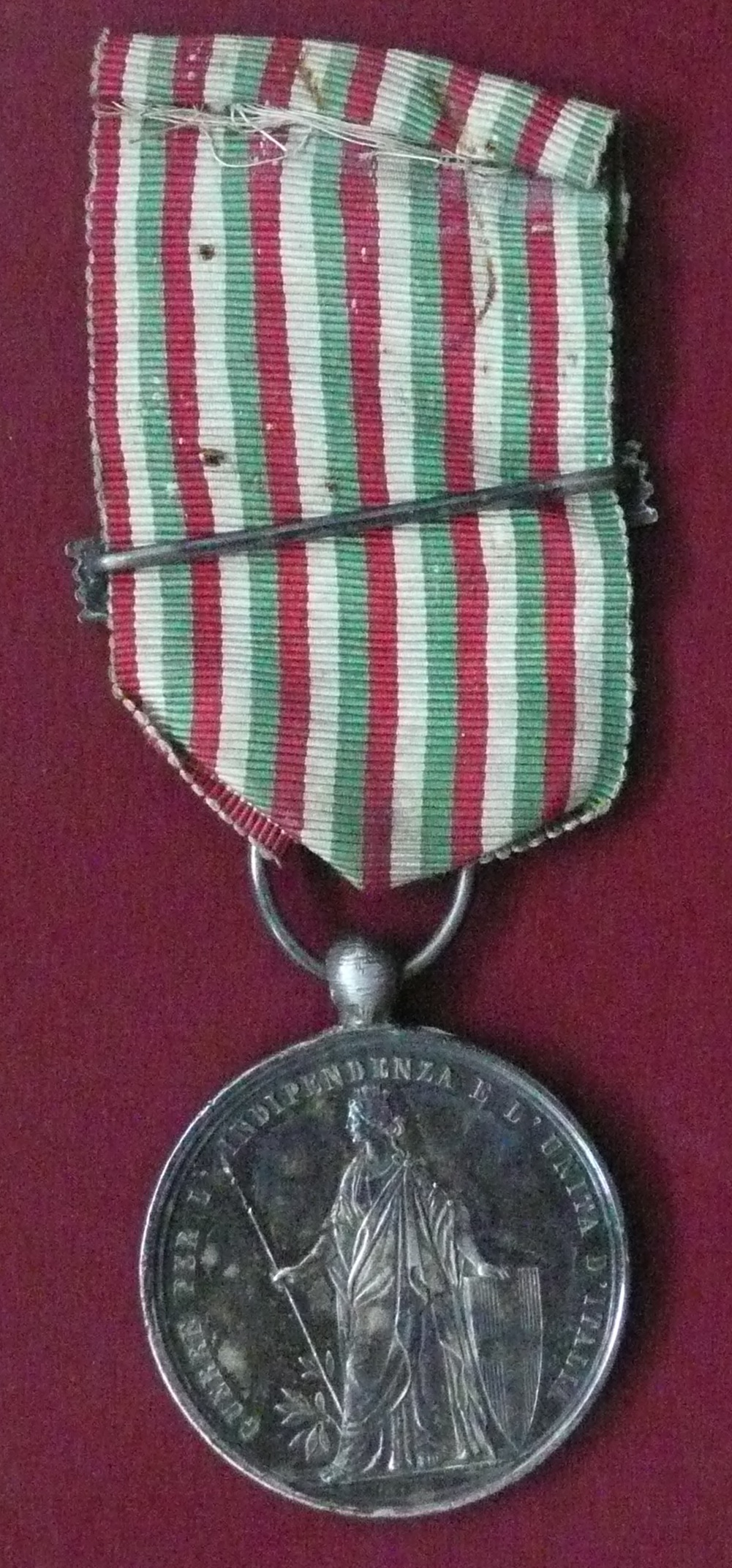
- Related: Commemorative Medal of the Unity of Italy, 1848–1870; Commemorative Medal of the Unity of Italy, 1848–1918

Commemorative medal for the campaigns of the Wars of Independence (Ribbon)
- Ribbon of the medal

With the intention of celebrating those who had taken part in the battles that had led to the constitution of the Kingdom of Italy in 1861, Vittorio Emanuele II, with Royal Decree no. 2174 of 4 March 1865[1], established the commemorative medal of the Wars fought in 1848, 1849, 1859, 1860 and 1861 for the independence and unity of Italy and granted it to all those who had fought in the first war of independence of 1848–49, in the second war of independence of 1859 and in the expedition of the Thousand, called "campaign for Southern Italy", of 1860–61.

All the military troops received the medal and its bands free of charge; for the others a commission was set up to examine the titles that gave entitlement to the medal accompanied by one or more bands.

The medal was to be worn with a ribbon on which were applied as many silver bands as there were the campaigns in which one had participated.

The decree established that the medal could not be combined with any other national medal established for the same title, except for that of the Thousand of the municipality of Palermo.

The concession of this medal was then extended to those who had participated in the Third War of Independence of 1866[2] and the capture of Rome in 1870, subsequently those who had participated in the Crimean War (1855–56)[3] and the enterprise of the Agro Romano in 1867[4] were also entitled to the medal.

=== Insignia ===
==== Medal ====
The medal consists of a silver disc, with a diameter of 32 mm and a thickness of 1 mm, suspended from a ring, with

on the obverse:

the face of the sovereign facing left, surrounded by the legend "Vittorio Emanuele II King of Italy". On some models, under the neck of the king is the signature of the engraver: "Canzani", "Cassina" or others;

on the reverse:

draped female figure with turreted crown (personification of Italy) holding with her right hand a spear that comes out of a laurel branch and with her left hand leans on a Savoy shield; at the entrance (from 8 am to 4 am) the inscription "Wars for independence and the unification of Italy".

==== Ribbon ====
The medal was to be worn hanging on the left side of the chest with a silk ribbon 33 mmi wide, bearing the Italian tricolor repeated six times (eighteen vertical red, white and green lines).

This same ribbon, but with green on the left and red on the right, was used for the badge for war fatigue then transformed into the commemorative medal of the Italo-Austrian war 1915 – 18 which, in this respect, are to be considered the continuation of the series of commemorative honors of the struggles for independence.

The founding provision[1], which did not allow the ribbon to be worn without the medal, was modified by Royal Decree no. 470 of 29 July 1906[5] which instead gave the right to carry only the ribbon.

==== Bar ====
To indicate the military campaign for which the decoration had been conferred, one or more silver bars were applied on the ribbon; each bar was a silver laurel branch engraved with the year or years of service: the bars were established for the years 1848, 1849, 1855–56, 1859, 1860–61, 1866, 1867, 1870.

== Umberto I of Savoy ==
Commemorative Medal of the Unity of Italy, 1848–1870
- Type: Commemorative medal
- Awarded for: participation in the 1st, 2nd, or 3rd Italian Wars of Independence
- Presented by: the Kingdom of Italy
- Eligibility: Italian soldiers and officers
- Campaign: Unification of Italy
- Status: Discontinued on 19 January 1922
- Established: 26 April 1883
- Related: Commemorative medal for the campaigns of the Wars of Independence; Commemorative Medal of the Unity of Italy, 1848–1918

Commemorative Medal of the Unity of Italy, 1848–1870 (Ribbon)
- Ribbon of the medal
- Established: 29 July 1906

Umberto I, to celebrate the Risorgimento and the work of his father, the pater patriae, again instituted the medal with Royal Decree 26 April 1883, n. 1294[6], with which he conferred it, in silver, to all those who had fought in at least one of the wars for independence and the Unification of Italy of the years 1848, 1849, 1859, 1860–61, 1866, 1870 and in the eastern countryside in the years 1855–56.

In addition, those who had taken part in the Sapri expedition of 1857 or in the agro-roman enterprise in 1867 could boast the new medal; the qualifications proving this participation had to be submitted to the examination of a special Commission, provided for by the founding measure and appointed in 1883[7].

The medal was to be distributed free of charge to the low-strength soldiers present in service in 1883, for the others instead the purchase price from the Royal Mint of Rome was 4.60 lira.

=== Insignia ===
==== Medal ====
The medal consists of a silver disc with a diameter of 32 mm bearing

on the obverse:

the effigy of the sovereign with his bare head, facing left, surrounded on the edge by the legend "Umberto I Re d'Italia (Umberto I King of Italy)". On some versions, at the bottom of the edge, there is the signature of the engraver: "Speranza", or "L. Giorgi F.";

on the reverse:

in the center the inscription "Unità d'Italia 1848–1870" with around, on the edge, a closed laurel wreath, tied at the bottom by a double volute knot.

==== Ribbon ====
The ribbon, 33 mm wide, bears the Italian tricolor: in the center a green band of 11 mm with two white bands of 5.5 mm on the sides and at the edges two red bands of 5.5 mm

The founding provision[6], which did not allow the ribbon to be worn without the medal, was modified by Royal Decree no. 470 of 29 July 1906[5] which instead gave the right to carry only the ribbon.

== Vittorio Emanuele III of Italy ==
Commemorative Medal of the Unity of Italy, 1848–1918
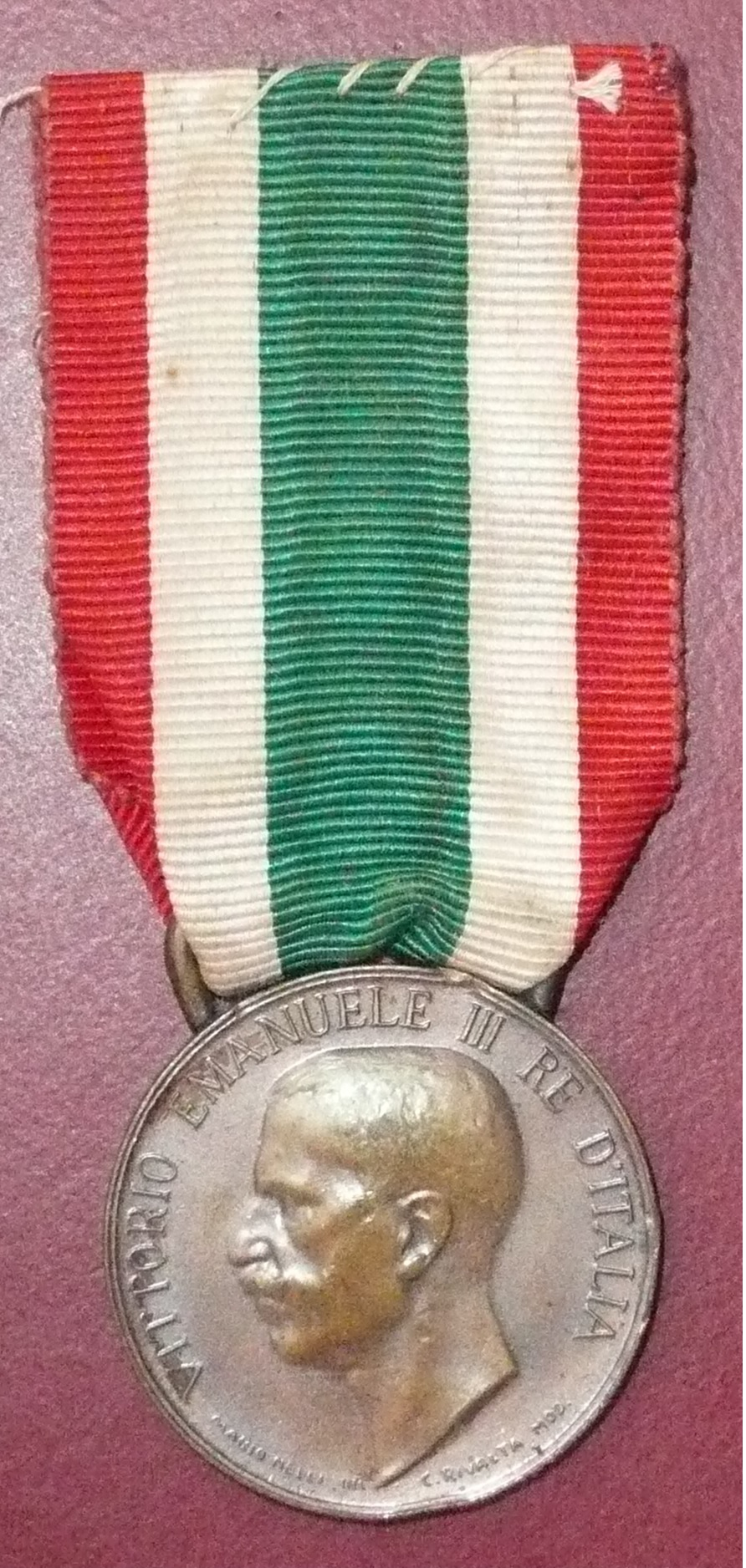
- The obverse and reverse (below) of the medal
- Type: Commemorative medal
- Awarded for: participation in the 1st, 2nd, 3rd, or 4th Italian Wars of Independence
- Presented by: the Kingdom of Italy
- Eligibility: Italian soldiers and officers
- Campaign: Unification of Italy
- Status: Discontinued on 13 December 2010
- Established: 19 January 1922
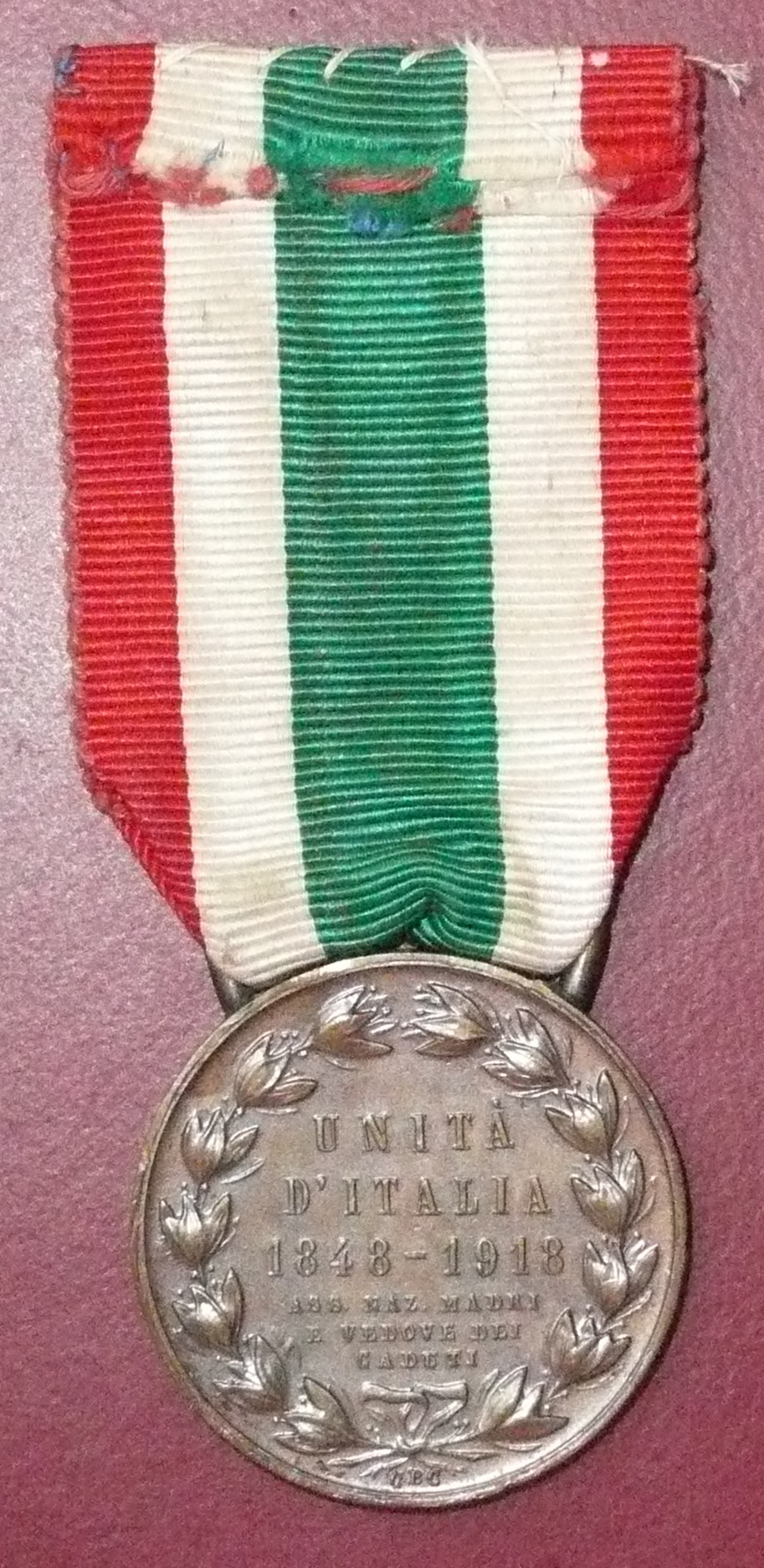

Precedence
- Next (higher): Commemorative Medal of the African Campaigns
- Equivalent: Commemorative Medal for the Italo-Austrian War 1915–1918
- Next (lower): Inter-allied Victory Medal
- Related: Commemorative medal for the campaigns of the Wars of Independence; Commemorative Medal of the Unity of Italy, 1848–1870

Commemorative Medal of the Unity of Italy, 1848–1918 (Ribbon)
- Ribbon of the medal

After the end of the First World War with the conquest of Trentino and Trieste, King Vittorio Emanuele III considered the reunification of the peninsula under the Kingdom of Italy complete and decided to "refound" the medal. It was thus promulgated the Royal Decree 19 January 1922, n. 1229, with which he extended the authorization to bear the medal established by King Umberto I with the Royal Decree 26 April 1883, n. 1294[6], to all the fighters who were or would have been granted the commemorative medal of the war 1915–1918 for the accomplishment of the Unification of Italy (the one "minted in enemy bronze"), referred to in Royal Decree no. 1241 of 29 July 1920[9].

The new medal therefore had characteristics similar to that of 1883, also with regard to the founding concept; the effigy of King Umberto I was changed with that of King Vittorio Emanuele III, the dating of the period of the years of the unification of Italy, "1848–1918" instead of "1848–1870" and metal, bronze instead of silver.

The authorization took the form of a sort of stamp, printed by casa Benvenuto Cellini (C B C), which was sent by the Ministry of War and which, to be valid, had to be "(...) applied on the patent of the medal of the 1915–1918 campaign'.

The founding decree was repealed in 2010[10].

=== Medal ===
The medal consists of a bronze disc with a diameter of 32 mm. Laying down

on the obverse:

the effigy of the bare-headed king, facing left, surrounded on the edge by the legend "Vittorio Emanuele III Re d'Italia"; on the bottom hem the names of the engraver "Mario Nelli Inc." and the model maker "C. Rivalta Mod.".

on the reverse:

in the center the inscription "Unità d'Italia 1848–1918" with around, on the edge, a closed laurel wreath, tied at the bottom by a double volute knot; under the knot the manufacturer's initials: "C B C" (Casa Benvenuto Cellini).

=== "1848 – 1922" variant ===
A new version of the medal was established by Royal Decree no. 1375 of 18 August 1940[12] which granted authorization to bear the medal established in memory of the Unification of Italy in 1883 to all those who had been granted the commemorative medal of the Expedition of Rijeka and that for the march on Rome, at the expense of the decorated persons concerned, with the following modifications with respect to the original medal: on the front, the effigy of King Umberto I was replaced with that of King Vittorio Emanuele III as well as the legend: "Umberto I King of Italy" replaced with that of: "Vittorio Emanuele III King of Italy"; on the reverse, the legend "Unification of Italy 1848–1870" was changed to "Unification of Italy 1848–1922".

These medals were also accompanied by an authorization in the form of a large stamp to be applied on the certificate of the medal for the March on Rome or on that for the medal for the Enterprise of Rijeka.

They were minted by the S.I.A.M. (Italian Society for the Art of the Medal), but do not bear any initials (silent coinage).

By law no. 169 of 17 February 1941[13], the minting and sale of this medal was also granted exclusively to the National Association of Families Who Died in the War.

The decree establishing this medal was also repealed following the entry into force of Legislative Decree No. 212 of 2010. (10]

=== Other variants ===
Other companies, such as Stefano Johnson, produced the medals in numerous variations in size (31, 32 or 33 mm), in the design of the king's head, laurel branches, wording and acronyms.

=== Ribbon ===
The ribbon, for all types of medals, was composed of the Italian tricolor: in the center a green band of 13 mm with two white bands of 6 mm on the sides and then two red bands of 6 mm.

== Note ==
1. ^a b Report and Royal Decree No. 2174 of 4 March 1865, published in the Official Gazette of the Kingdom of Italy No. 59 of 9 March 1865
2. ^ Royal decree granting the Italian commemorative medal to all those who made the campaign of 1866 and grants special rewards to those who most distinguished themselves, Florence, Tip. Fodratti, 1866.
3. ^ Royal Decree of 3 April 1898 published in the Official Gazette of the Kingdom of Italy no. 97 of 26 April 1898
4. ^ Royal Decree no. 3 of 4 January 1900 published in the Official Gazette of the Kingdom of Italy no. 14 of 18 January 1900
5. ^ Royal Decree No. 470 of 29 July 1906 replacement of articles to the decrees concerning commemorative medals and crosses, published in the Official Gazette of the Kingdom of Italy no. 204 of 31 August 1906
6. ^ Royal Decree No. 1294 of 26 April 1883, published in the Official Gazette of the Kingdom of Italy No. 100 of 28 April 1883
7. ^ Royal Decree of 20 May 1883, published in the Official Gazette of the Kingdom of Italy no. 126 of 31 May 1883
8. ^ Royal Decree no. 1229 of 19 January 1922, published in the Official Gazette of the Kingdom of Italy no. 217 of 14 September 1922
9. ^ Royal Decree no. 1241 of 29 July 1920, published in the Official Gazette of the Kingdom of Italy no. 222 of 18 September 1920
10. ^ Legislative Decree no. 212 of 13 December 2010, Repeal of state legislative provisions, pursuant to Article 14, paragraph 14-quarter, of Law no. 246 of 28 November 2005, published in the Official Gazette of the Italian Republic no. 292 of 15 December 2010, ordinary supplement no. 276.
11. ^ Royal Decree-Law no. 1362 of 19 October 1922, published in the Official Gazette of the Kingdom of Italy no. 255 of 30 October 1922, converted into law no. 478 of 17 April 1925
12. ^ Royal Decree 18 August 1940, n. 1375, Extension of the concession of the medal of the Unification of Italy to the recipients of the commemorative medal of the expedition of Fiume or the March on Rome, published in the Official Gazette of the Kingdom of Italy n. 240 of 12 October 1940.
13. ^ Law 17 February 1941, n. 169, Exclusivity in favor of the National Association of families fallen in war of the minting and sale of the medal in memory of the Unification of Italy established by R. decree 18 August 1940-XVIII, n. 1375, published in the Official Gazette of the Kingdom of Italy n. 80 of 3 April 1941, repealed by Law 18 February 2009, n. 9, Conversion into law, with amendments, of Decree-Law no. 200 of 22 December 2008 on urgent measures in the field of regulatory simplification, published in the Official Gazette of the Italian Republic no. 42 of 20 February 2009, ordinary supplement no. 25.

== Bibliography ==
Giuseppe Morittu, Guerre e decorazioni 1848 – 1945, Padova, Bolzonella s.n.c, 1982.
Giuseppe Morittu, Meriti e decorazioni 1839 – 1945, Padova, CS, 1982, S28/00010255.
Costantino Scarpa, Paolo Sézanne, Le decorazioni del Regno di Sardegna e del Regno d'Italia, (two volumes), Uffici storici Esercito – Marina – Aeronautica, 1982–1985.
Roberto Manno, Two hundred years of medals. The signs of value and participation in historical events from 1793 to 1993, Hobby & Work Publishing, 1995, ISBN 88-7133-191-5, 9788871331911.
Alessandro Brambilla, Le medaglie italiane negli ultimi 200 anni, (due tomi), Milano, 1997 [1985].
Ercole Ercoli, Le Medaglie al Valore, al Merito e Commemorative – Militari e Civili nei Regni di Sardegna, d'Italia e nella Repubblica Italiana – 1793–1976, Milano, I.D.L., 1976.
