= Monument to the Fallen =

Monument to the Fallen may refer to:

- Monument to the Fallen, Pistoia, a 1926 World War I memorial in Tuscany, Italy
- Monument to the Fallen, Reggio Emilia, a 1927 World War I memorial in Emilia-Romagna, Italy
- Monument to the Fallen, Riccia, a 1925 World War I memorial in Molise, Italy
- Monument to the Fallen (Santa Cruz de Tenerife), a 1947 Spanish Civil War memorial in Spain
