= Austro-Italian War =

Austro-Italian War, less commonly Italo-Austrian War, may refer to:

- Neapolitan War (1815)
- First Italian War of Independence (1848–49)
- Second Italian War of Independence (1859)
- Third Italian War of Independence (1866)
- Italian Campaign of World War I (1915–18)

== See also ==
- Commemorative Medal for the Italo-Austrian War 1915–1918
