= Commemorative Medal for the Italo-Austrian War 1915–1918 =

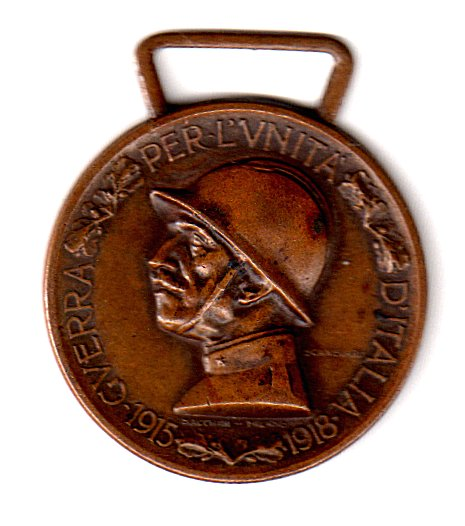
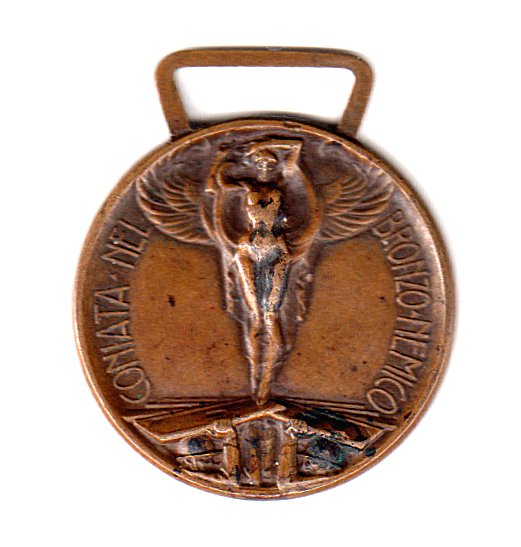
- The obverse (left) and reverse of the medal
- Type: Commemorative medal
- Awarded for: service during and immediately after World War I in the national territory of Italy, in the Dodecanese, in Albania, Syria, and Palestine
- Presented by: the Kingdom of Italy
- Clasps: 1915, 1916, 1917, 1918, Albania 1919, Albania 1920
- Established: 29 July 1920

Highlights
- Total recipients: approximately 1,800,000
- Ribbon of the medal

Precedence
- Next (higher): Commemorative Medal of the African Campaigns
- Next (lower): Inter-allied Victory Medal

The Commemorative Medal for the Italo-Austrian War 1915–1918 is a campaign medal that was awarded by the Kingdom of Italy for participation in World War I.

== History ==
The medal was established by Royal Decree Of Victor Emmanuel III No. 1 241 of 29 July 1920 to award soldiers of the Italian Armed Forces and Navy who participated in hostilities against Austria-Hungary, as well as in the Dodecanese, Albania, Syria and Palestine against the Ottoman Empire. The design of the medal was developed by engraver Silvio Canevari. The medal marks not only the victory in the First World War, but also the completion of the unification of Italy and the 70th anniversary of the beginning of the revolutionary actions of 1848 for the independence of the state.

Earlier, on 21 May 1916, a special sign (bar with a stretched ribbon) was founded in Italy, which was awarded to employees of the Italian Army and Navy for 1 year of active service. The ribbon on the bar consisted of the colors of the Italian Flag (alternating green, white and red stripes), which is repeated six times. Each additional year of service was marked on the bar with a silver asterisk.

Royal Decree No. 150 of 17 January 1918 established a sign for merchant ship crews. Although these sailors did not participate directly in combat, they were also often at risk as a result of military operations. This sign represented a ribbon of silk with eleven vertical stripes of equal width of blue and white. By Royal Decree No. 1786 of 15 July 1923, the badge was converted into a Medal of Merit for Merchant Navy Crews, completely identical to the commemorative medal, but on the ribbon of the mark for merchant ship crews.

Royal Decree No. 665 of 3 May 1918 established a sign for railway workers. The sign consisted of a silk ribbon 37mm wide, which has 3 red stripes 9mm wide each, alternating with two white stripes 5mm wide each. After the introduction of the medal, some railway workers hung such medals at their own risk on the ribbon of the previously established sign, although there was no official decree on the absorption of this bar sign with a medal.

A peculiarity of this medal, made evident in the inscription on the back that mentions "minted in enemy bronze", is that the founding decree provided that it should be "cast with the bronze of the artillery taken from the enemy".

According to official data, more than 1,800,000 people were awarded the medal.

== Appearance ==
=== Medal ===
Round bronze medal. Height (measured with an Adamus device) — 38.5mm, diameter — 32-32,5mm, thickness — about 4mm.

Obverse: The left-turned profile of King Victor Emmanuel III in Hadrian's uniform and helmet. In a circle is the inscription "GUERRA PER L'UNITA D'ITALIA" (War for The Unity of Italy), at the bottom are the dates of 1915–1918.

Reverse: an image of the winged Goddess of Victory on the shields of Roman legionnaires supported by Italian soldiers with the inscription: on the left – CONIATO NEL, on the right – VRONZO NEMICO (Minted from enemy bronze).

=== Ribbon ===
The decree determined that the ribbon of the medal should have the same colours as the Badge for war fatigue, which was thus replaced. The ribbon of the medal consisted of the colours of the Italian flag (alternating green, white and red stripes), which is repeated six times. The width of the ribbon is 38mm. In fact, the ribbon is almost identical to that of the commemorative medal of the campaigns of the Wars of Independence, which has red on the left and green on the right, as the Italo-Austrian conflict was considered the continuation of the struggles for independence.

=== Clasps ===
Bronze clasps can be attached to the ribbon to recall the years of participation in the war with the clasps: "1915", "1916", "1917" and "1918". In 1921, King Victor Emmanuel III also commissioned the clasps marked "Albania 1919" and "Albania 1920" for participants in this military campaign.

When wearing a full-sized medal, bronze clasps are used, when wearing the ribbon on a pad daily – a silver star is used, each of which marks 1 year of service during the war.

Ribbons
Less than 1 year of campaign	1 year of campaign	2 years of campaign	3 years of campaign	4 years of campaign

There are fracas copies of the Commemorative Medal, which were made by various companies and workshops, so there are a large number of miniature options.

== Statute of award/Eligibility criteria ==
Decree No. 1 241 of 29 July 1920 provided that the right to receive a medal at the expense of the state have:

All military personnel of the army and navy, as well as related personnel and employees of bodies and auxiliary units who at least had a total service life of at least one year and participated in the war in Italy; persons who have suffered wounds or injuries or suffered a serious illness during the war, even if they have served for less than a year; all soldiers of the army and navy who for at least four months participated in the war in the Greek archipelago of The Dodecanese, Albania, Syria and Palestine. The beginning of the campaign was considered to be 24 May 1915, the end on 4 November 1918, while for the Italian military contingent in Albania, the qualifying period is considered to be 2 August 1920 (the date of signing the Italo-Albanian Convention).

The commemorative medal is worn on the left side of the chest, alone or in a group with other awards. In the presence of other awards, this medal is worn after the Commemorative Medal of the Italo-Turkish War of 1911–1912 and before the medal "For Services to the Crews of the Merchant Navy". However, since the presence of a medal of two medals is unlikely, the Medal of Victory is most often the memorial medal on the slats and pads. The calculation of the years of campaign began on 24 May 1915 and ended on 4 November 1918, while as regards the soldiers of the contingent sent to Albania the useful period was extended until 2 August 1920, the date of the signing of the Italo-Albanian Convention.

It was also granted to non-Italian soldiers, in particular French and some Austrians, who later became Italian citizens with the annexation of Trentino, who had distinguished themselves in battle.

== Manufacturers ==
In connection with the need to produce a large number of copies of this award, it was produced by several companies. Therefore, the awards have small differences, and under the portrait of the king contained the stigma of the manufacturer. There are stamps of six varieties, although there are medals without manufacturer's markings:

FL & CM

M.Nelli. Inc.

Sacchini-Milano

S.I.M.

S.I.M. Roma

S.J.

== Well-known awardees ==
- Victor Emanuel III
- Benito Mussolini
- Ernest Hemingway
- Sebastiano Visconti Prasca
