= Monument to the Fallen, Pistoia =

War memorial in Pistoia, Tuscany, Italy

Coordinates: 43.935807°N 10.911779°E

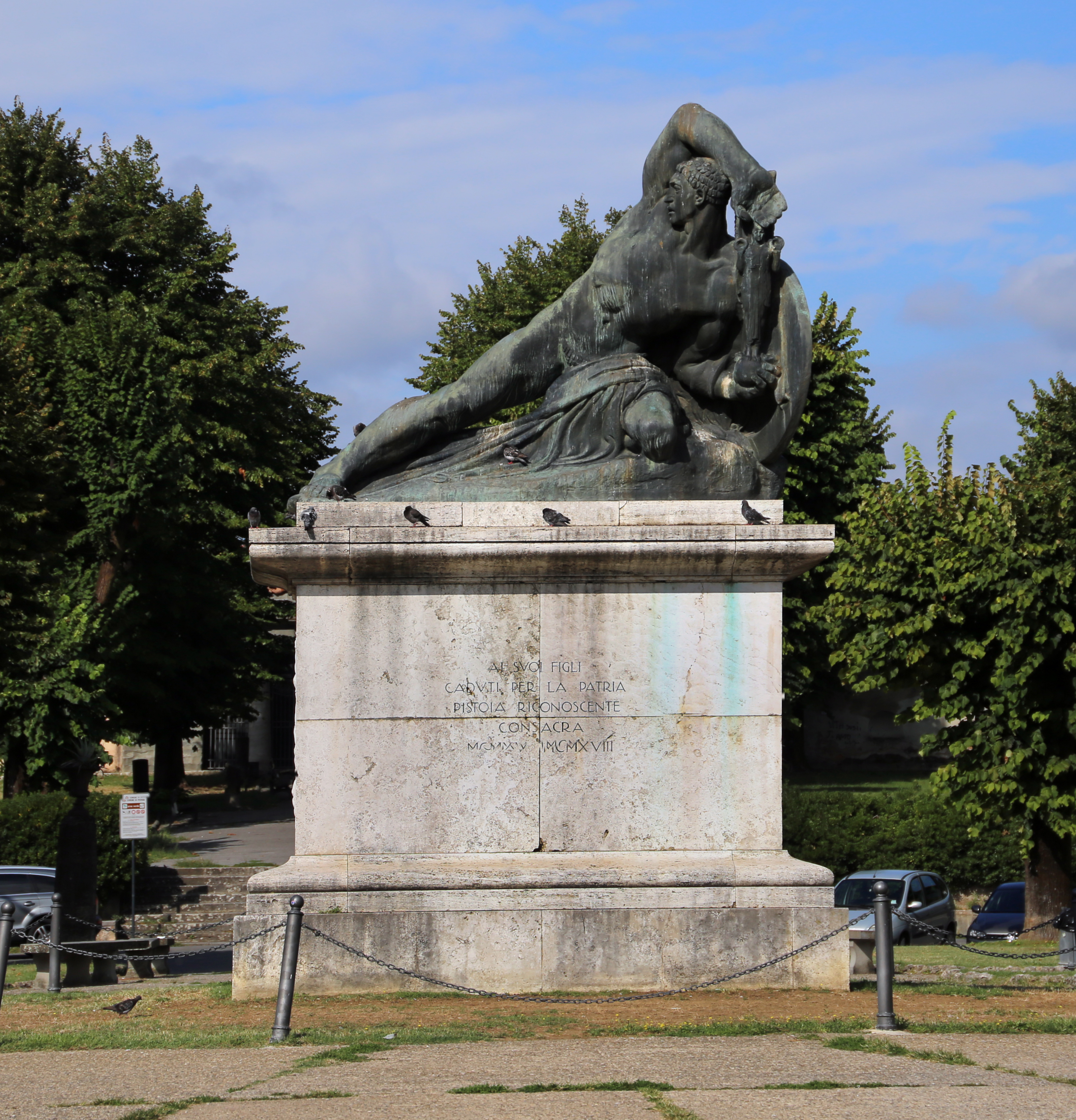
Monument to the Fallen

The Monument to the Fallen (Italian: Monumento ai Caduti) is a Fascist-era monument located in the center of Piazza San Francesco in Pistoia, Tuscany, Italy. The monument was meant to recall those fallen in the battles of World War I between 1915 and 1918. Though completed some years before, the bronze statue was only installed in 1926 with the King in attendance. The bronze statue shows a muscular, partly nude, semi-recumbent man sheltering a statue of Victory as he glares to the distance. The statue is on a marble base with flanking bas-reliefs depicting a winged victory and a mother and child sharing bundles of wheat (fasces). The sculptor, Silvio Canevari (1891–1953), would go on to sculpt statues of athletes for the Stadio dei Marmi in Rome. Many of this statues, including The Pugilist and his Monument to Victory (commemorating those who fell in the wars of Africa) at Civita Castellana, also focus on the athletic man in combat.
