= Monument to the Fallen, Reggio Emilia =

War memorial in Reggio Emilia, Italy

Monument to the Italians Fallen (in the First World War)
- Monumento ai Caduti
- Italy
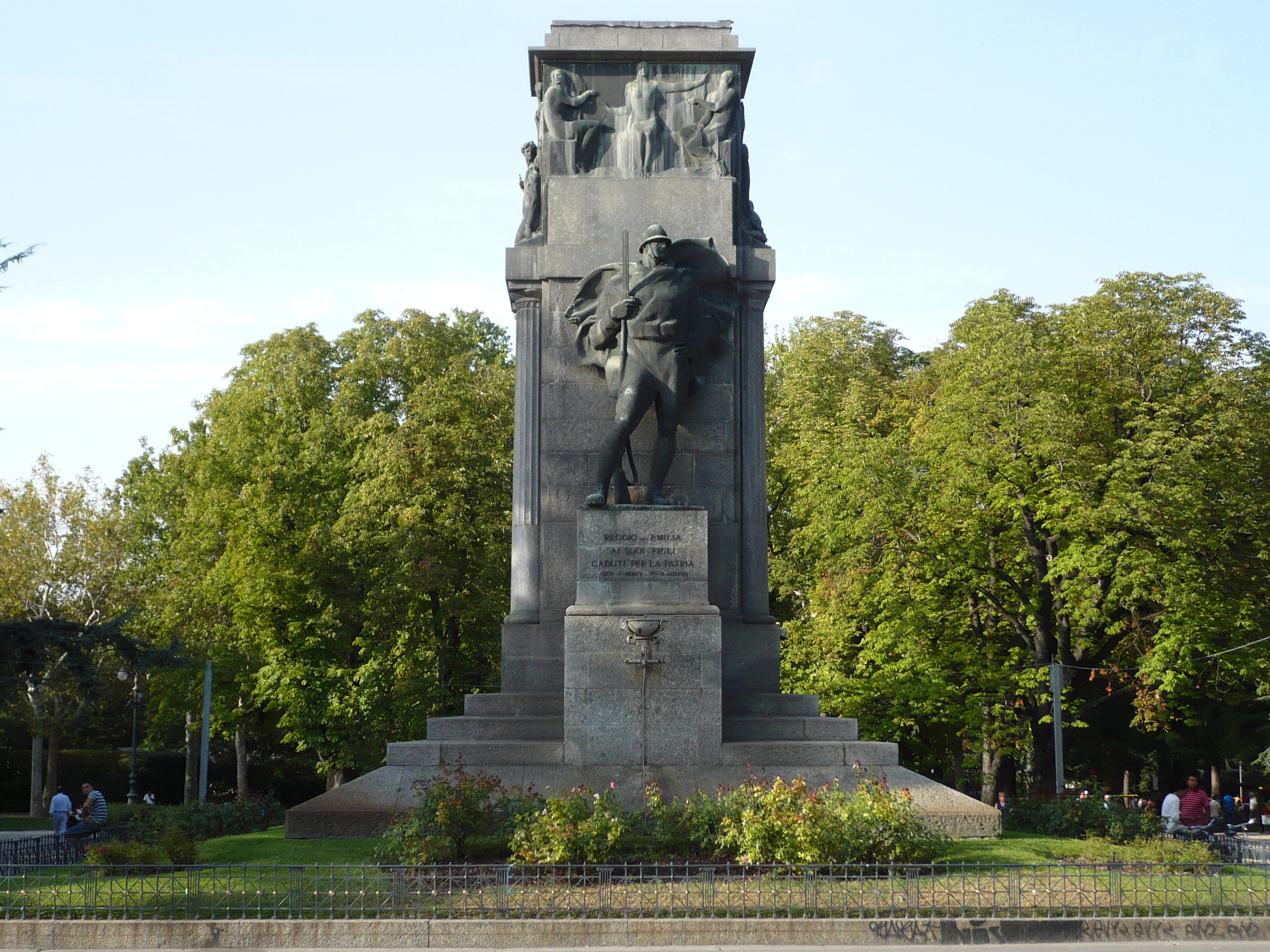
- South view (from Piazza della Vittoria)
- For Italians who died in First World War
- Established: 30 October 1927
- Location: 44°42′03″N 10°37′48″E; Parco del Popolo, between Piazza della Vittoria and Giardini Pubblici near Reggio Emilia, Province of Reggio Emilia, Italy
- Designed by: Alberto Bazzoni

The Monument to the Fallen (Italian: Monumento ai Caduti) is a Fascist-era monument, dedicated to the Italians who died during the First World War (1915–1918), and located in central Reggio Emilia, at the south border of the Parco del Popolo (also called the Giardino Publico), at the border with Piazza della Vittoria and just west of the town's Opera House.

== Description ==
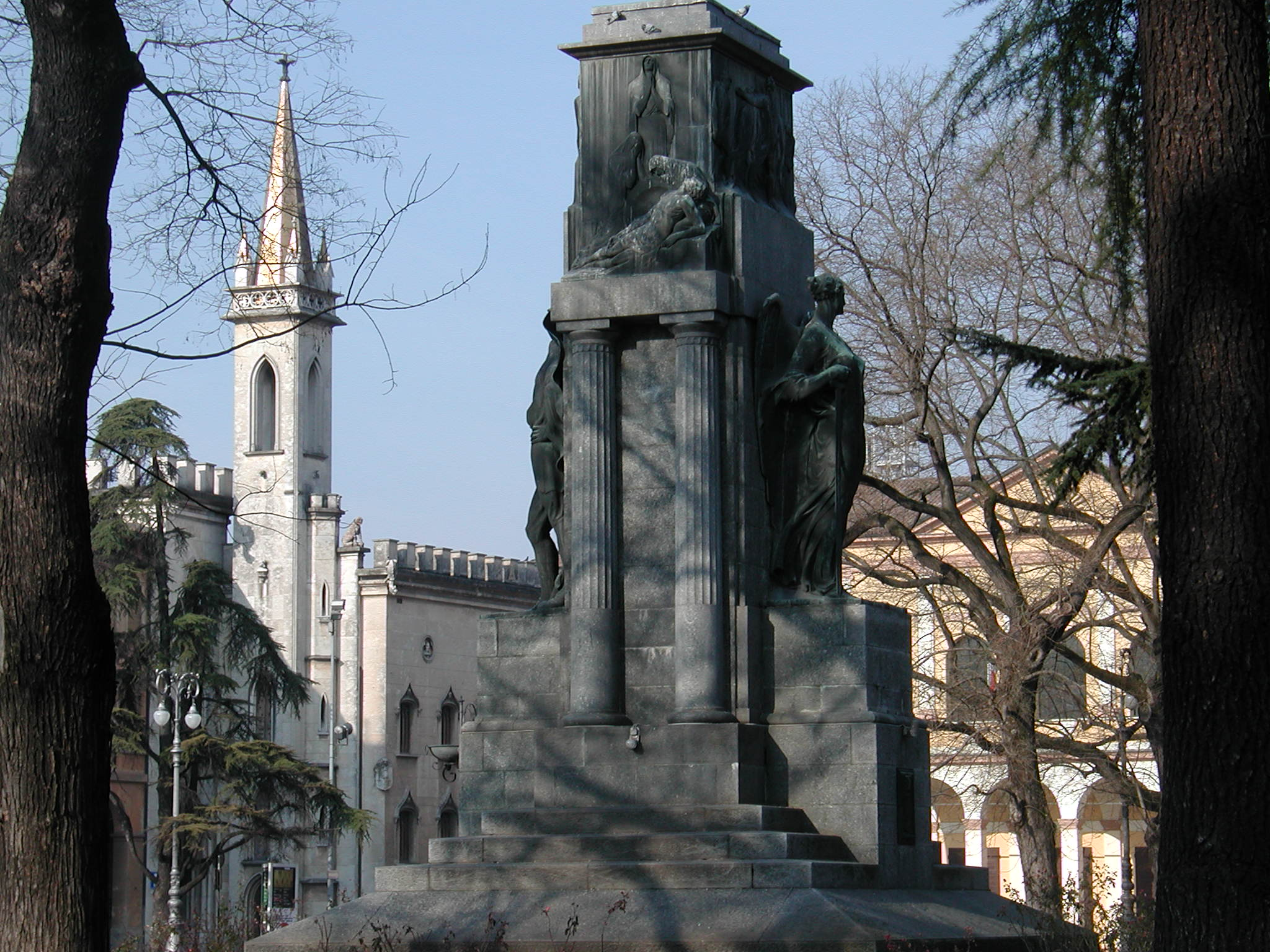
View of the monument from the southeast

The monument consists of a rectangular tower 15 meters high on a rectangular plinth 17 meters at the longest; the east and west sides have each two Doric columns, while the north and south sides have free-standing bronze statues. The top of the central rectangle has four bronze plaques.

- North bronze statue: Winged Victory with sword
- North bronze plaque Two oxen and two men plow a field
- South bronze statue: Soldier with rifle
- South bronze plaque: Three Fates measuring a life
- East bronze plaque: Archer and two helpers
- West bronze plaque: Fallen soldier and three women mourning

The commission was initially awarded after a competition to the sculptor Alberto Bazzoni (1889–1973). By the time the monument was completed, the design had acquired the fascist overtones honoring patriotic militarism. The soldier also has a facial resemblance to Benito Mussolini.
