= Silvio Canevari =

Italian sculptor

- Born: 27 January 1893; Viterbo, Italy
- Died: 1 August 1932 (aged 39); Rome, Italy
- Occupation: Sculptor

Silvio Canevari (27 January 1893 – 1 August 1932) was an Italian sculptor. He sculpted a monumental marble Hercules (Ercole) and a boxer (Pugilatore) for the Stadio dei Marmi of 1932. His work was also part of the sculpture event in the art competition at the 1936 Summer Olympics. He also completed the Monument to the Fallen, Pistoia in 1926.
