= Alberto Bazzoni =

Italian sculptor (1889–1973)

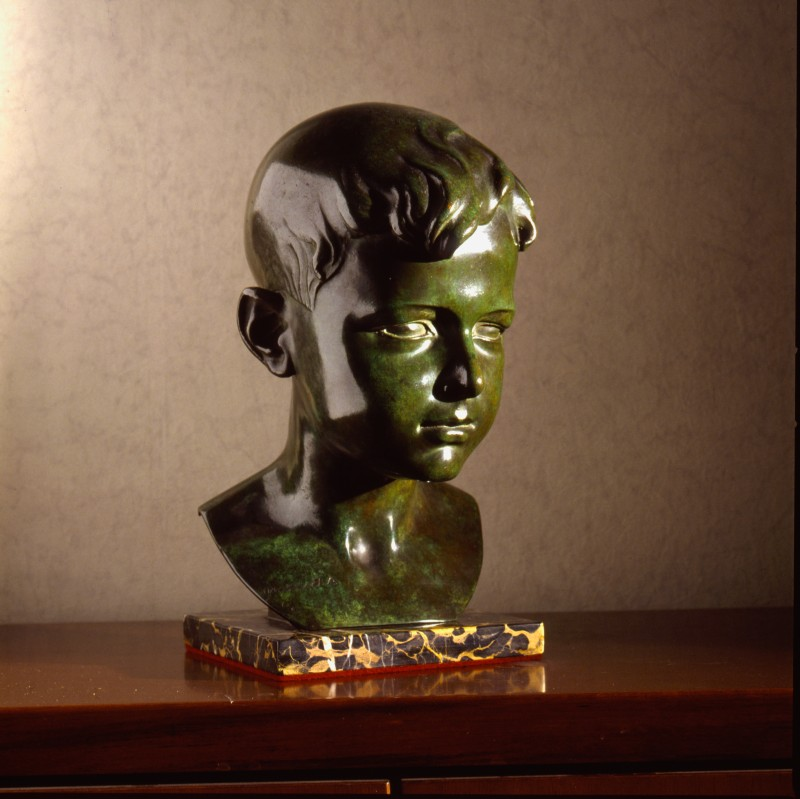
Testa di bimbo, 1940 (Art collections of Fondazione Cariplo)

Alberto Bazzoni (San Nicomede di Salsomaggiore (Parma), 1889 – Milan, 1973) was an Italian sculptor.

== Biography ==
After serving in World War I, Bazzoni settled in Parma, where he attended the Academy of Fine Arts from 1908 to 1913. His public works included a fountain for the barracks in Reggio Emilia and monuments to the fallen in Fidenza and Salsomaggiore. He moved to Milan in 1926 and continued his career as a sculptor there. The influence of his study of Roman sculpture can be seen in the statue of Saint Augustine for Milan Cathedral and the tomb of his wife Bianca in the Cimitero Monumentale. He went to Paris in 1936 and remained there until the outbreak of World War II, producing small bronzes for private collectors. After a second stay in the French capital from 1946 to 1950, he returned to Milan.

== Other projects ==
Media related to Alberto Bazzoni at Wikimedia Commons
