= Stadio dei Marmi =

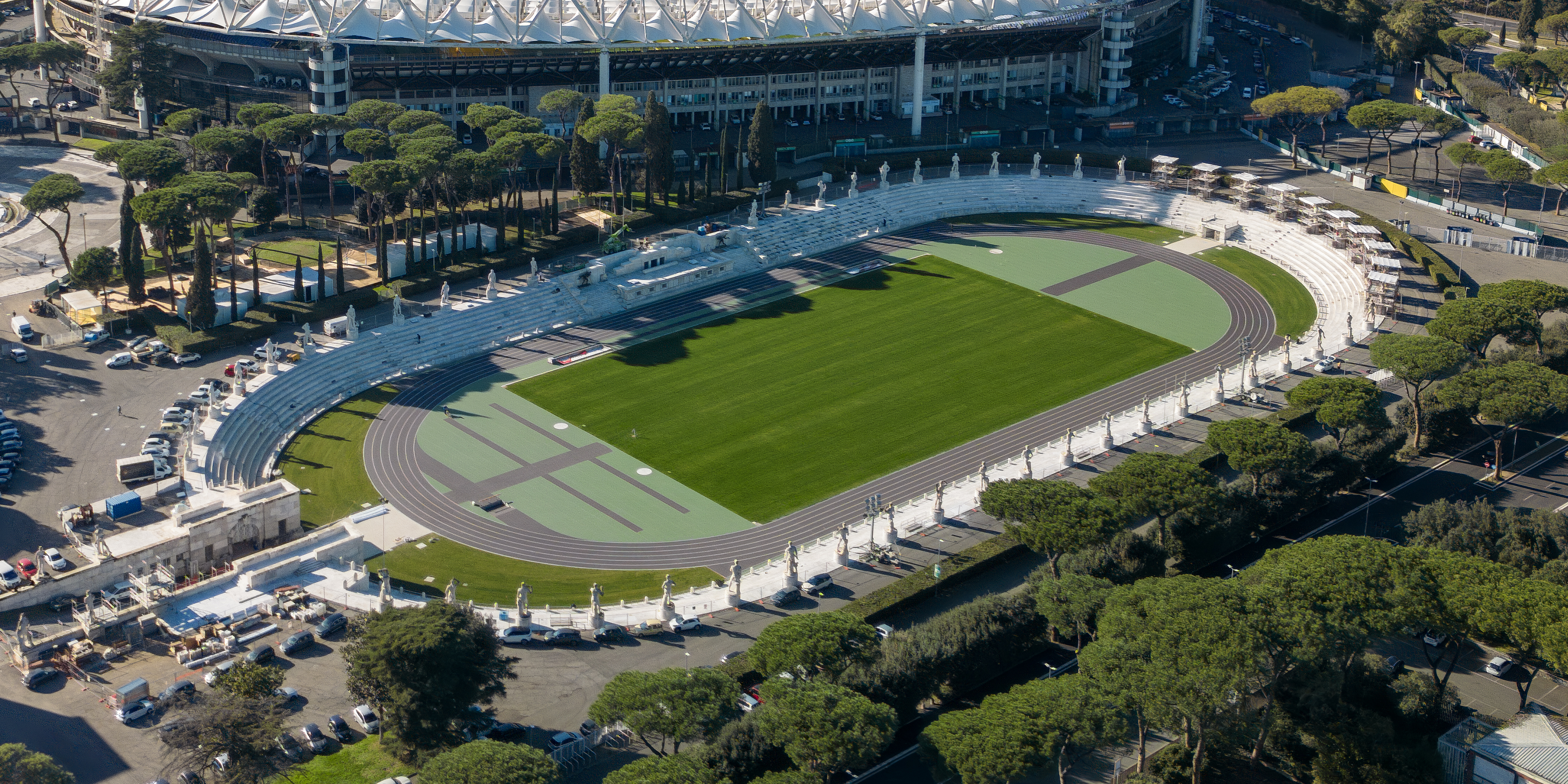
- Stadio dei Marmi (erected in 1932), Foro Italico, Rome, Italy
- Click on the map for a fullscreen view

General information
- Location: Rome
- Coordinates: 41°56′03″N 12°27′27″E

Other information
- Seating capacity: 5,280

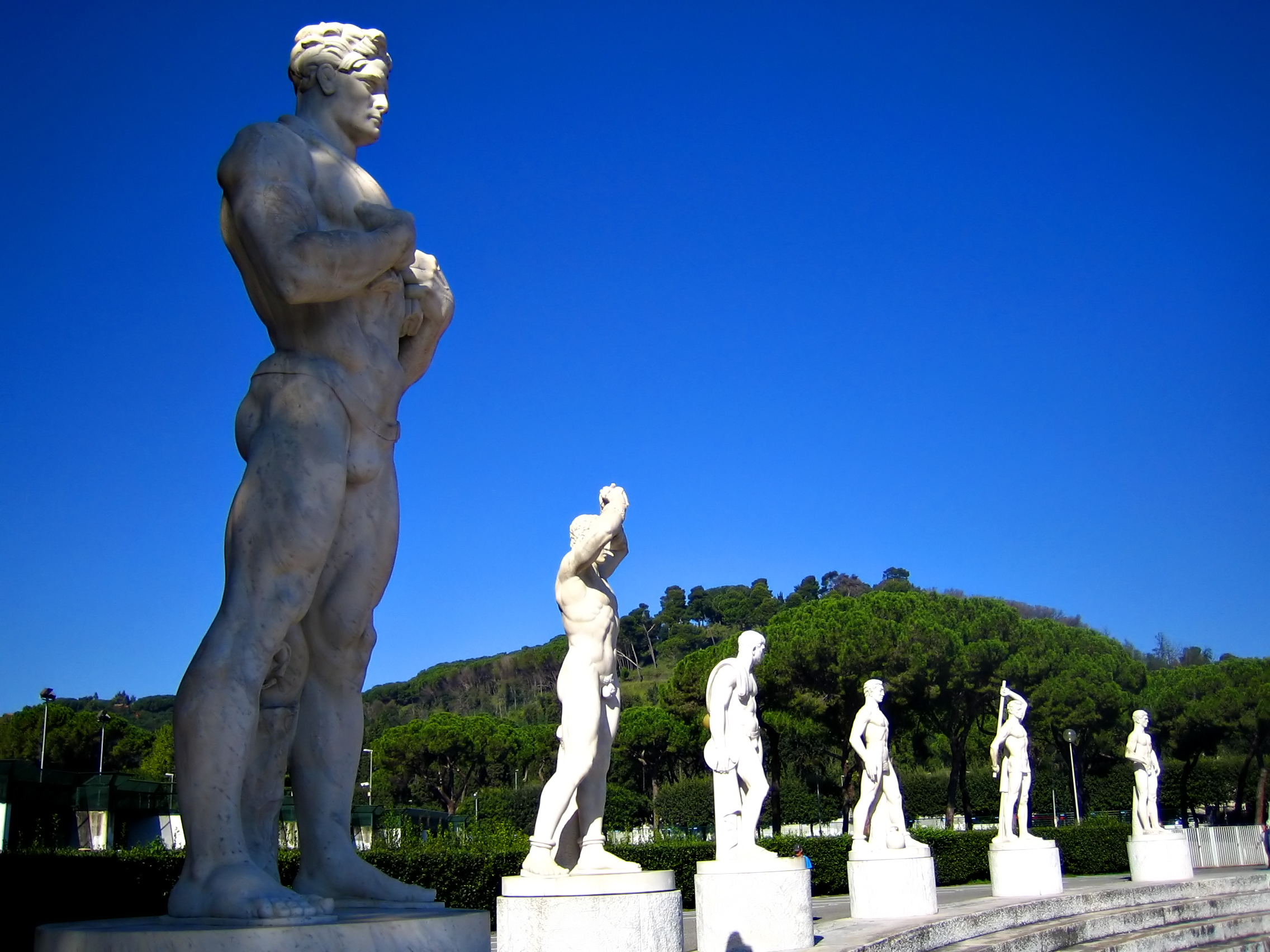
Sixty 4-meter tall Carrara marble athletic sculptures ring around the stadium, produced by 24 artists and sculptors during the Fascist regime

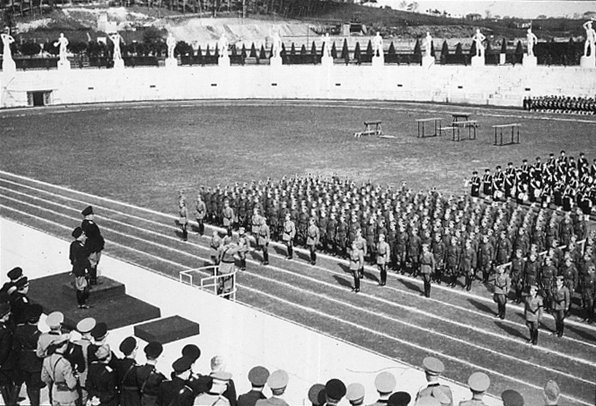
Stadio dei Marmi - a military parade during the Fascist (Mussolini) regime

The Stadio dei Marmi ("Stadium of the Marbles") is one of four stadiums located in the colossal sports complex, the Foro Italico in Rome, Italy. The other stadiums are the Stadio Olimpico, the Stadio del tennis Romano, and the Stadio Olimpico del Nuoto. Stadio dei Marmi was designed in the 1920s as a complement to the annex Fascist Academy of Physical Education (now the seat of CONI, Italian Olympic Committee), to be used by its students for training. The Stadio dei Marmi first opened in 1932, on the 10th anniversary of the March on Rome, near the Roman neighborhood Monte Mario, by the architect Enrico Del Debbio under the Fascist ruler Benito Mussolini. The Stadio dei Marmi is encircled by sixty, 4-meter tall classical statues of athletes made from Carrara marble. The stadium was built to celebrate Fascist accomplishments and the Gioventú del Littorio, the youth movement of the National Fascist Party of Italy. In its twenty-year reign, the Fascist regime used sports to introduce and instill new fascist "traditions", ideals, customs, and values, with the goal of forming citizen warriors. Subsequently the Stadio dei Marmi has been used to host some of the field hockey preliminaries for the 1960 Summer Olympics. It also hosted the opening ceremony for the 2009 World Aquatics Championships.

== History ==
Early on, the Fascist movement saw the potential of using sports to promote its political and economic ideologies. Immediately after the March on Rome, the Fascist regime invested in large-scale sports arenas, buildings, and institutions, such as the Stadio dei Marmi, which made sports accessible to all classes of society. Through sports, Fascist institutions emphasized and promoted Fascist values, which developed a national identity. The most prevalent and valued sports included combat sports such as boxing, Greco-Roman wrestling, and javelin, hammer, or stone throwing. Through physical education and sports, the Fascist government aimed to create professional militia and warriors, who would readily enter war. Mussolini began the construction of then named Foro Mussolini in 1928 as the central sports city and, in 1932, he opened the Instituto Superiore Fascista di Educazione (Fascist Institute for Physical Education) as the first male athletic institution. The importance that the Fascist regime placed on male physical education highlighted the characteristics of the ideal Fascist citizen, as well as the rigid gender binaries it instilled within Italian culture. After its unveiling, the Stadio dei Marmi became the leading physical education training center for the Gioventù Italiana Littorio, the youth movement of the National Fascist Party of Italy. During the Fascist period, the Stadio and complex became the nation's center for athleticism and increasingly renowned until Italy joined the war in 1940. According to the historian Eden K. McLean, "the Mussolini Forum was designed to forge educators and political leaders united by an Italian-Fascist sensibility about the past, present, and future of the race."

== Sculptures and architecture ==
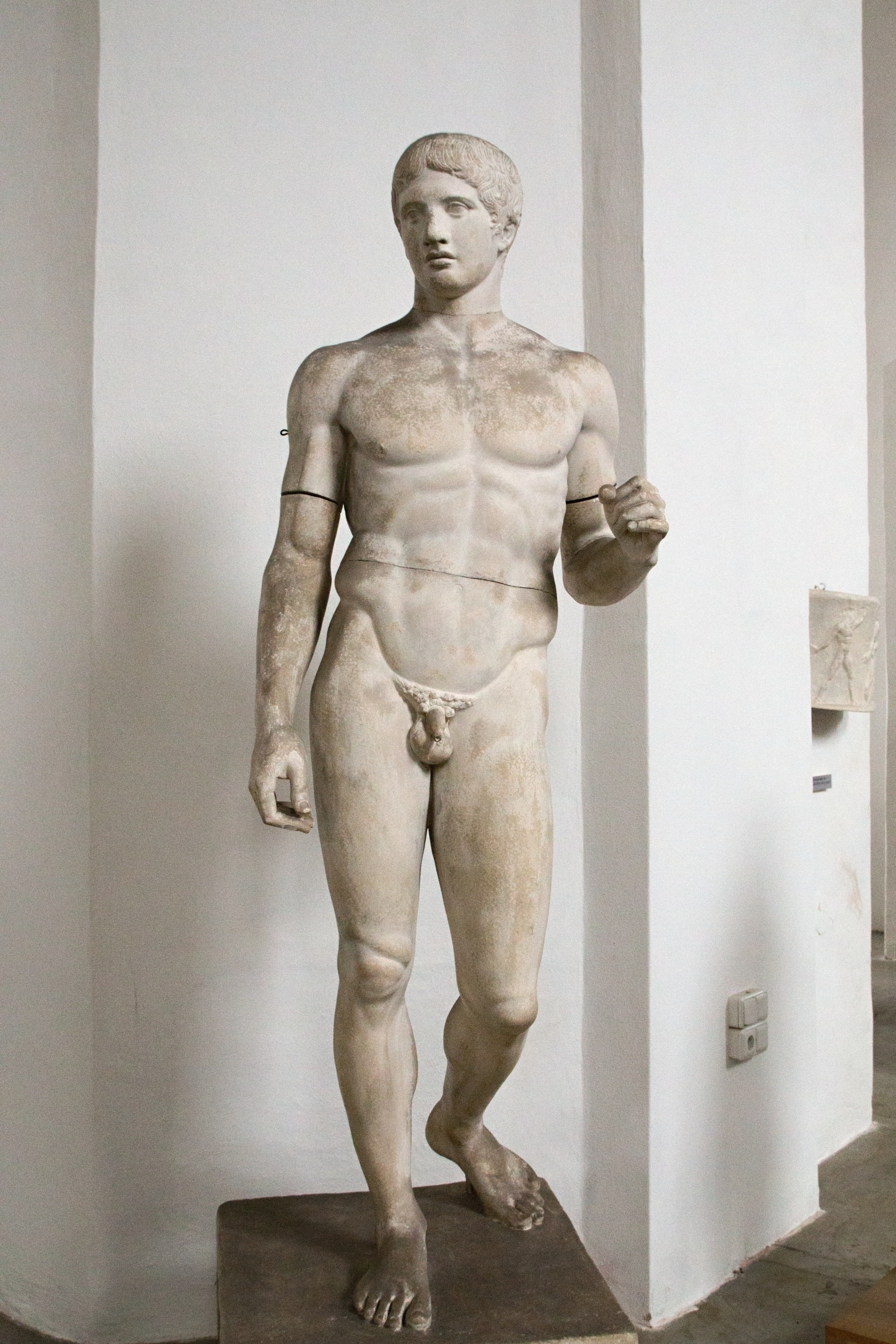
A classical statue of Doryphoros Polykeitos (440 BC - plaster cast) which, among others, influenced the sculptural design of the athletic statues encircling the stadium

The sixty towering Carrara marble athletic statues ringing the stadium were gifted by the Italian provinces and embodied the ancient cardinal Roman values: virilitas, fortitudo, disciplina, and gravitas (virility, fortitude, discipline, and dignity). They were designed and produced by twenty-four sculptors, who were chosen from a contest, and included artists like Nicola D'Antino, Aldo Buttini, Silvio Canevari, Carlo de Veroli, Publio Morbiducci, Eugenio Baroni, Arnolfo Bellini, Francesco Messina, and Romano Romanelli. The sculptors adhered to classical forms and elements, when they used Greek and Roman statues as models, such as Doryphoros of Polykleitos and Discobolus of Myron, which stood out against the plain white marble architecture of the stadium. The statues, monuments, and architecture produced under the Fascist regime were a fusion of ancient Roman and modern elements. According to the architect Enrico Del Debbio, the sports complex was designed as an "architectonic complex of severe monumentality ... the result is the emergence of a monumental group, which can be traced back to the greatest monuments of ancient Rome." The impressive statues of the Stadio dei Marmi resemble the ancient Roman Foro Imperiale. These statues, which incorporated classical elements, served to glorify Mussolini, in order to equate him to Augustus, the Roman emperor, and memorialize Fascism. "The obvious references to Rome, claimed Fascist propagandists, made the Foro Mussolini the living embodiment of the 'Mediterranean spirit and the Latin world at its best.'"

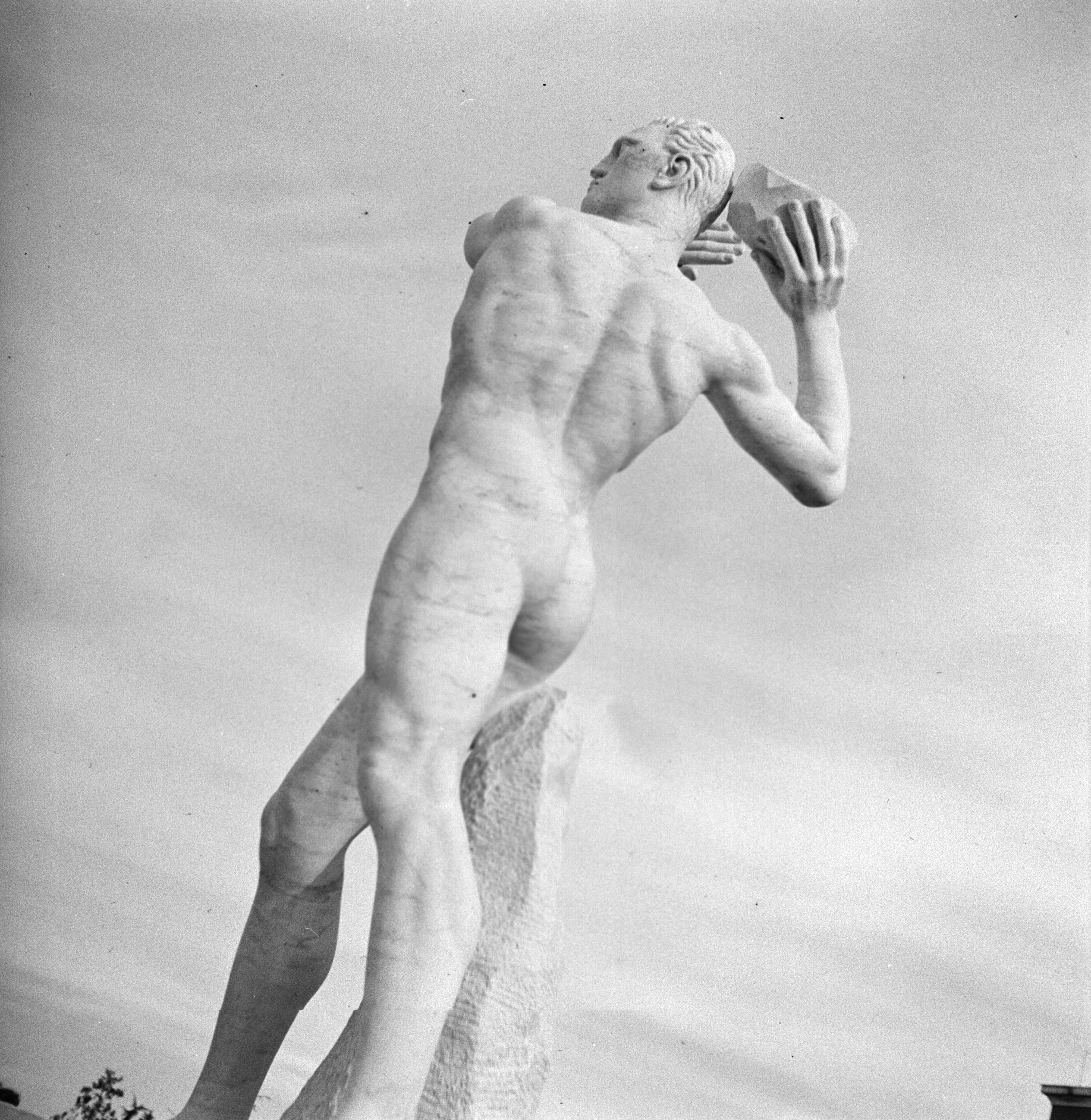
Aroldo Bellini's Atleta che scaglia una pietra (athlete throwing a stone); Stadio dei Marmi

Renato Ricci, chief of the Opera Nazionale Balilla (O.N.B), the Fascist youth organization, oversaw the design and sculpting process of the statues encircling the Stadio dei Marmi, aiming to ensure stylistic standardization and visual consistency between the sculptures carved by the various artists. The statues represented the most esteemed Fascist sports and were intended to evoke heroism by displaying monumental and imposing athletes in static, powerful, and valiant poses with a focus on gestures and proportions, rather than in arbitrary motion or action. Many of the statues are shown at rest, in vigorous stances. In Aroldo Bellini's statue of an Atleta che scaglia una pietra (athlete throwing a stone), for example, the athlete's pose lacks signs of any physical exertion.

The Stadio dei Marmi exemplifies the ancient body politic metaphor: the important interrelationship between the ideal male body and the ideal nation. Its large-scale athletic sculptures represent the idealized, strong, masculine body that was fundamental to Fascist ideology while strengthening the belief that through sports 'mens sana in corpore sano' (healthy mind in a healthy body) can be achieved.

== The Olympic games and subsequent use ==
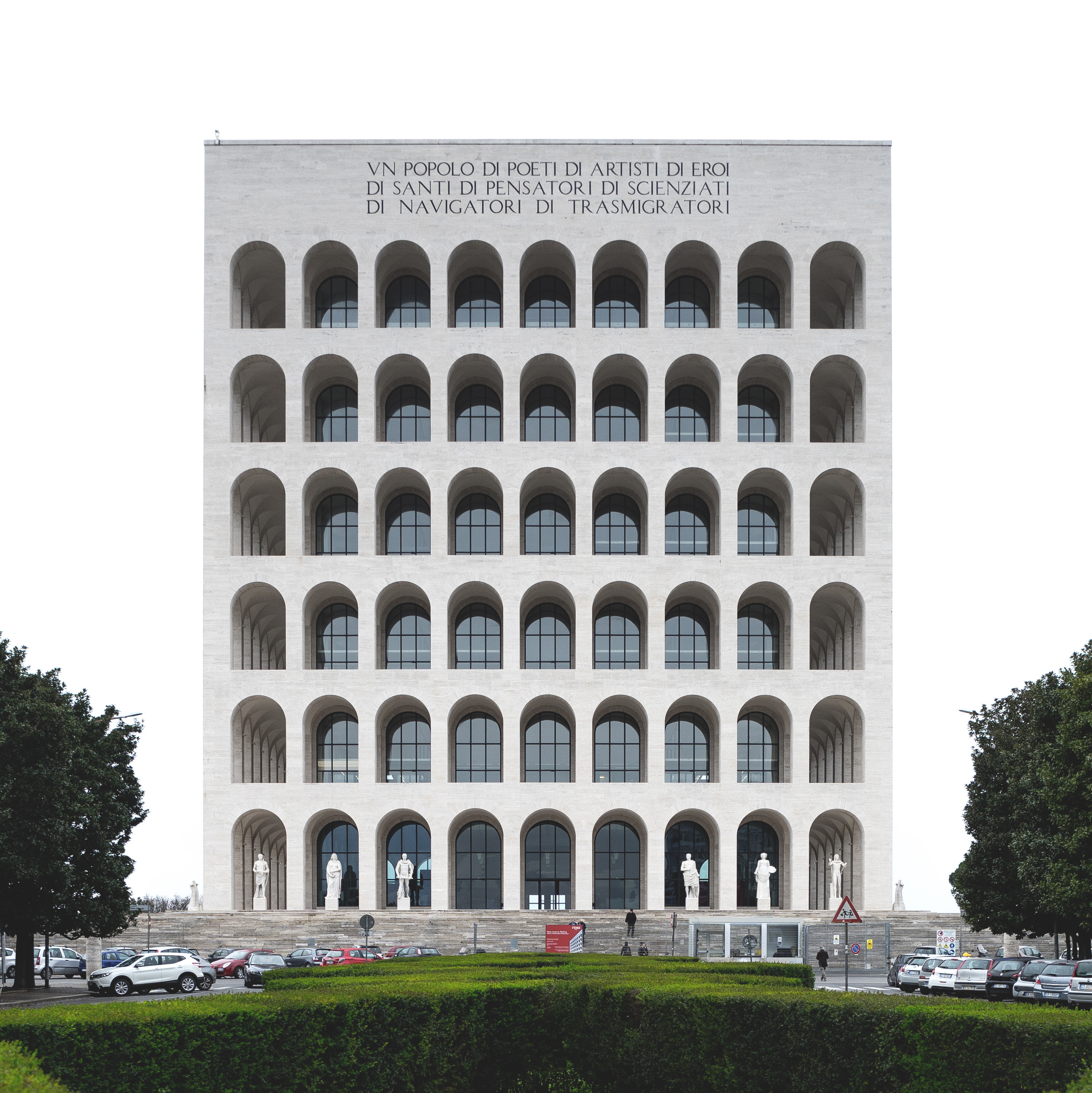
Palazzo della Civiltà Italiana, located in the new neighborhood built by the Fascist regime, Esposizione Universale Roma (EUR)

Prior to World War II, Italy's Fascist regime invested in large-scale construction projects such as the new neighborhood Esposizione Universale Roma (EUR), which included the Palazzo della Civiltà Italiana, and the Foro Mussolini (now known as the Foro Italico), which contained the Stadio dei Marmi. To this day, these monuments, buildings, stadiums, statues, and neighborhoods are incorporated into Italy's past, culture, and history, due to both the lack of funds in post-war Italy to rebuild major districts and buildings and the presence and persistence of Fascist ideology. After the Fascist regime was defeated in 1943, the Foro Italico was not destroyed and demolished because it was used by the Allied military as a refuge center. Following Mussolini's reign (1922 to 1943), the Stadio dei Marmi has been continuously used for various sporting events including the 1960 Summer Olympic Games, when it hosted the field hockey tournament.

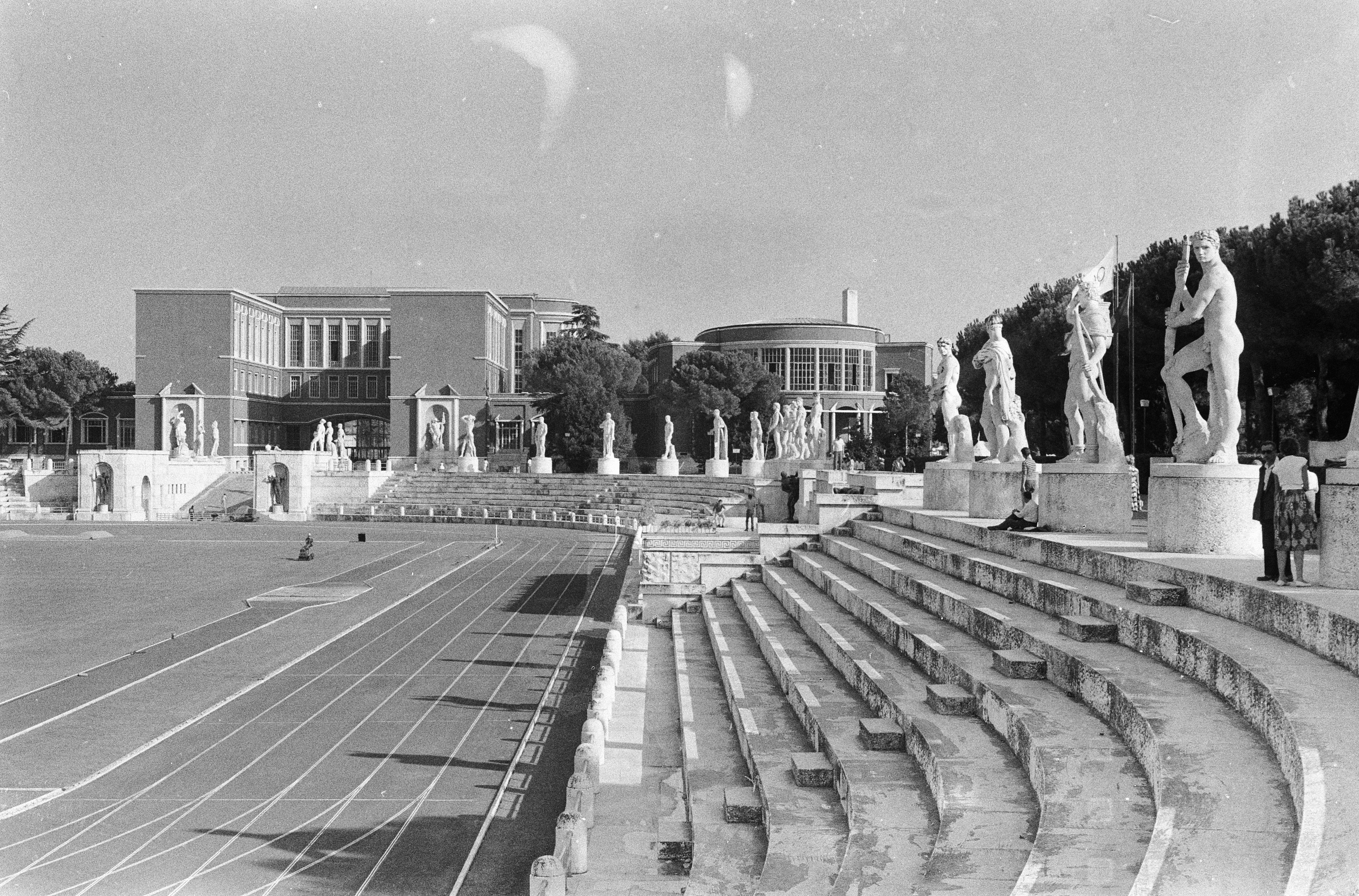
1960 Olympic Games, at the Stadio dei Marmi

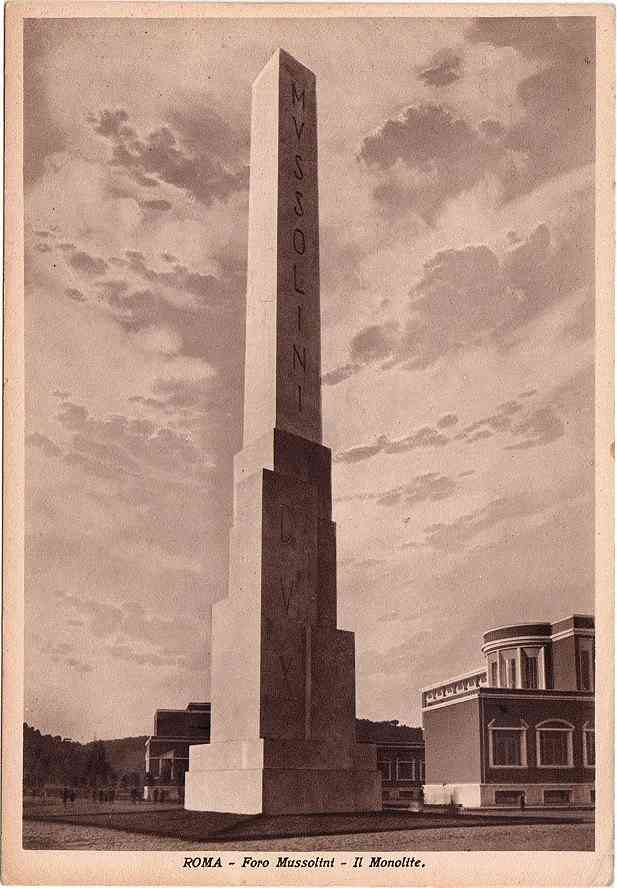
Sixty-foot tall marble obelisk with the inscription 'Mussolini Dux' at the entrance of the Foro Italico

The 1960 Olympic Games presented an opportunity to unveil Italy's new democratic identity. Leading up to the Olympic Games, officials began debating the obvious fascist insignia, mosaics, and elements surrounding the sporting complex and how the world might respond to them. At the time, visitors from all around the world arrived at the Foro Italico, passing the sixty-foot tall marble obelisk with the inscription 'Mussolini Dux' and then witnessing an array of mosaics and marble slabs celebrating both the Fascist leader and the movement. During the 1960s, there was a strong political divide between the left and the right. As the left came to power and suggested removing overtly Fascist symbols within and surrounding the Olympic stadium, there was substantial Fascist opposition. The Neo-Fascists, supported by the Movimento Sociale Italiano, demanded that: 'la storia non si cancella' (history must not be erased). Two of the extremely inflammatory inscriptions were taken down, but many were preserved out of fear that those who celebrated Fascism and its ideology would revolt and disrupt Italy's democratic and united appearance. Social, economic, and political influence, as well as the Vatican's power allowed "the Fascist past [to be] drowned under the weight of the classical and Christian heritage." The Vatican owned the land underneath the stadium, and the Pope, Pope Pius XII, supported the use of the stadium for the Games because it not only would attract many visitors, but also bring in revenue for the Vatican. During the 1960s, there was little focus, controversy, or criticism placed on the "Fascist heritage" or its "political origins" and the purpose of the stadium, but rather on the history of ancient Rome and its classical elements used in the design of the statues within the stadium and the architecture of the stadium itself.

Prior to the 1990 Football Championships, the Foro Italico underwent a large-scale restoration. Some people supported the restoration of these stadiums as an initiative to protect Italian historical heritage, while others considered it as an act of honor to the Fascist leader, Mussolini. The restoration was managed by Walter Veltroni, the Minister of Culture, who stated: "To condemn [Fascism] we need to understand, historicize, and rationalize it, not remove it."

== Romanità and the Fascist regime ==
Romanità is "a deep affection for Rome and things Roman, in an effort to identify with a primordial Rome that is impervious to contemporary political and social trends." This fondness arose in Fascist society through the emphasis that it placed on sports as a form of civic and military education, and it continues to thrive within Italian soccer culture. Apart from being a Fascist site, the Stadio dei Marmi, with its ancient Roman and Greek inspired statues, and modern, pure, and simple architecture, is also a site of Romanità, where all Italian social classes learned values of unity, vigor, and virility. Extremists argue that the grandeur of Stadio dei Marmi itself is an exemplar of "superiority of Roman cultural forms." Through sports and the concept of Romanità, the Fascist regime not only associated itself with Ancient Rome, but strengthened and unified itself. To this day, the concept of Romanità continues to inhabit the Stadio Olimpico, at the Foro Italico, with the rival soccer teams A.S. Roma and S.S. Lazio.

== Criticism ==
Professor Valerie Higgins, Program Director of Sustainable Cultural Heritage, remarked that the decision to keep almost all Fascist monuments, inscriptions, symbols, and architecture visible was not an act of negative heritage or tribute to past terror, but an act to fake and preserve a united appearance to the world. Therefore, she argued that the use of the Stadio dei Marmi in the 1960 Olympic Games was an example "of the way that Italy has never fully come to terms with its role in the Second World War, and the spectre of that lack of reckoning continues to haunt heritage planning." Recently, there has been much debate surrounding what to do with monuments, inscriptions, buildings, and architecture that have Fascist origins, where the Left maintains that democratic Italy should not erase its history, the Moderates claim indifference, and the Right views these sights solely as architecture rather than Fascist propaganda.
