= Italian War of Independence =

The War of Italian Independence, or Italian Wars of Independence, include:

- First Italian War of Independence (1848–1849)
- Second Italian War of Independence (1859)
- Third Italian War of Independence (1866)
- Fourth Italian War of Independence (1915–1918): alternative name for the Italian participation in World War I.
